= List of Bob Dylan concert tours =

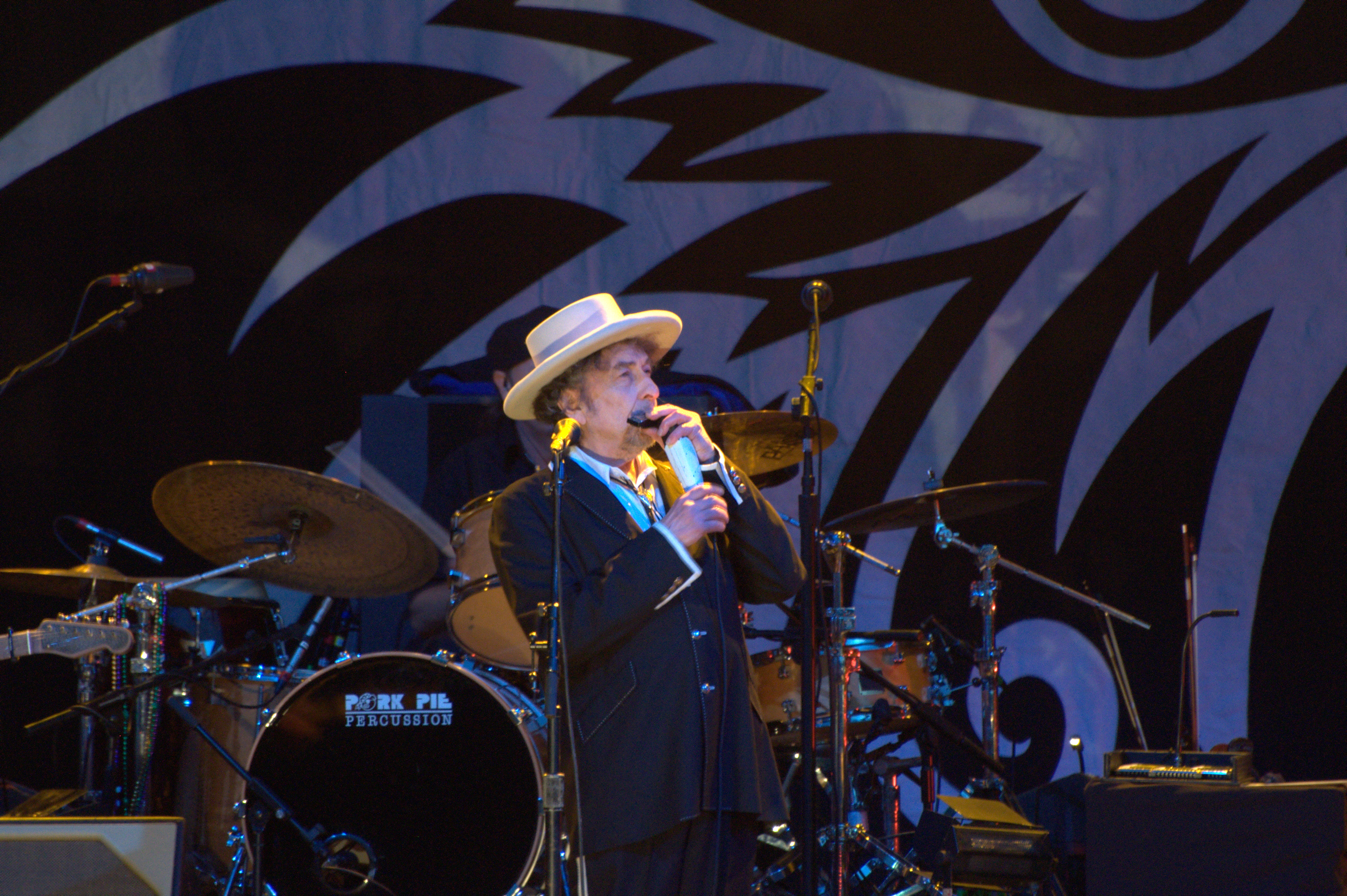
Bob Dylan performing at Finsbury Park, London, June 18, 2011

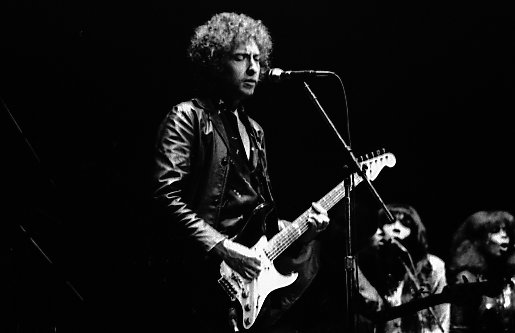
Dylan in Toronto April 18, 1980

Bob Dylan (born Robert Allen Zimmerman, May 24, 1941) is an American singer-songwriter, artist and writer. He has been influential in popular music and culture for more than five decades. Much of his most celebrated work dates from the 1960s, when he was both a chronicler and reluctant figurehead of social unrest. Early songs such as "Blowin' in the Wind" and "The Times They Are a-Changin'" became anthems for the Civil Rights Movement and anti-war movement. Leaving his initial base in the American folk music revival, Dylan's six-minute single "Like a Rolling Stone" altered the range of popular music in 1965. His mid-1960s recordings, backed by rock musicians, reached the top end of the United States music charts while also attracting denunciation and criticism from others in the folk movement.

The Never Ending Tour commenced on June 7, 1988, and Dylan has played roughly 100 dates a year for the entirety of the 1990s and 2000s—a heavier schedule than most performers who started out in the 1960s. By May 2013, Dylan and his band had played more than 2,500 shows, anchored by long-time bassist Tony Garnier, multi-instrumentalist Donnie Herron, and guitarist Charlie Sexton.

== 1960s ==
Year(s)	Tour	Dates	Number of shows
1964	1964 World Tour	February 1 – December 7, 1964	47
1965	Tour of North America	January 29 – April 24, 1965	19
1965	Tour of England	April 30 – May 10, 1965	8
Bob Dylan's first concert tour took place during late April and early May 1965. The tour was widely documented by filmmaker D. A. Pennebaker, who used the footage of the tour in his documentary Dont Look Back.
1965	Tour of North America	July 24 – Dec 19, 1965	42
Dylan toured America and Canada, including his infamous concerts at the Newport Folk Festival.
1966	World Tour	February 4 – May 27, 1966	47
Dylan and his backing group gave concerts sporadically throughout the United States and Canada while the initial sessions for Blonde on Blonde were being recorded. The first leg of the tour took place in North America. Leaving the continental United States, Dylan traveled to Hawaii and from there to Australia. The tour group then flew to Scandinavia for concerts in Stockholm and Copenhagen. Dylan then toured the United Kingdom. He made a short trip to Paris before he finished the tour in London. On July 29, 1966, two months after the last concert of the World Tour, Dylan was involved in a motorcycle accident and although Dylan still had bookings for 1966 and beyond, he canceled all engagements.

== 1970s ==
Year(s)	Tour	Dates	Number of shows
1974	Bob Dylan and The Band Tour	January 3 – February 14, 1974	40
This tour reunited Dylan with The Band on stage after the release of the Dylan's Band-backed Planet Waves album. This was a high-profile comeback for both sides of the bill. While virtually all the songs here were familiar and might be considered 'hits'. At the beginning of the tour, a few songs from Planet Waves were performed in concert, but as the tour wore on, these songs gradually disappeared from the set list. By the end, only "Forever Young" would remain.
1975–76	Rolling Thunder Revue	October 30, 1975 – May 25, 1976	57
The Rolling Thunder Revue was a concert tour by American singer-songwriter Bob Dylan with a traveling caravan of musicians, including Joan Baez, Roger McGuinn, and Ramblin' Jack Elliott. Bob Neuwirth assembled the backing musicians, including T-Bone Burnett, Mick Ronson, David Mansfield, Steven Soles, violinist Scarlet Rivera, bassist Rob Stoner, and drummer Howie Wyeth.
1978	World Tour	February 20 – December 18, 1978	114
In 1978, Dylan embarked on a year-long world tour, performing 114 shows in Japan, the Far East, Australia, New Zealand, Europe and the US, to a total audience of two million people. For the tour, Dylan assembled an eight-piece band, and was also accompanied by three backing singers. The 1978 tour grossed more than $20 million, and Dylan acknowledged to the Los Angeles Times that he had some debts to pay off because "I had a couple of bad years. I put a lot of money into the movie, built a big house ... and it costs a lot to get divorced in California". The live recording of the fourth and fifth shows (of eight) in Tokyo was released as the double album Bob Dylan at Budokan. It was on this tour that Dylan found Jesus and became a born-again Christian.
1979–80	Gospel Tour	November 1, 1979 – May 21, 1980	79
On June 15, Dylan released the album Street-Legal, which received poor reviews from most American critics. Performances on his world tour also received negative reviews. The physical demands of touring were also taking a toll on the artist.

== 1980s ==
Year(s)	Tour	Dates	Number of shows
1981	1981 Tour	June 10 – November 21, 1981	54
The European tour ended in tragedy in Avignon, France where a member of the crowd fell into the electric cables before the first song and caused total power loss. Dylan and the band improvise an unplugged instrumental until the power is restored and ‘Saved’ is started from the beginning. In the accident two people were killed, but the show went ahead despite the incident.
1984	European Tour	May 28 – July 8, 1984	27
Dylan played some of the biggest and best known European music venues including Ullevi Stadion in Gothenburg, Sweden, St. James Park in Newcastle, England, Wembley Stadium in London, England and Slane Castle in County Meath, Ireland.
1986	True Confessions Tour	February 5 – August 6, 1986	60
Featuring Tom Petty and the Heartbreakers. The tour started with two concerts in New Zealand and thirteen concerts in Australia before four concerts in Japan.[4] Both Dylan and Petty took a break after this tour before returning to the road in June to perform a forty-one date tour of the United States and Canada.
1987	Dylan & the Dead Tour	July 4–26, 1987	6
Featuring The Grateful Dead. Each concert began with a lengthy set by the Grateful Dead of their own material (sometime broken into a first and second set, per the Dead's own practice), followed by a roughly 90-minute set of the Dead acting as Dylan's backup band.
1987	Temples in Flames Tour	September 5 – October 17, 1987	30
Featuring Tom Petty and the Heartbreakers. This was the last time that Dylan has toured with Tom Petty and the last tour before beginning the Never Ending Tour. Dylan and Petty briefly united in Holmdel, New Jersey in the summer of 2003.
1988	Never Ending Tour 1988	June 7 – October 19, 1988	71
This is the fewest performances on a 'Never Ending Tour' yearly tour. The 1988 tour stayed within the North America, performing 63 concerts in the United States and 8 in Canada. He performed in 29 states in the US and 6 provinces in Canada.
1989	Never Ending Tour 1989	May 25 – November 15, 1989	100
After finishing the European tour Dylan returned to the United States performing at many of the same venues that he had performed in the year before, on the first year of the Never Ending Tour. Dylan continued to perform in the United States and Canada until November 15.

== 1990s ==
Year(s)	Tour	Dates	Number of shows
1990	Never Ending Tour 1990	January 12 – November 18, 1990	93
The Never Ending Tour 1990 started off with a tour called the Fastbreak tour where Dylan performed in the United States, Brazil, France and England in less than thirty days. Dylan started his final tour of the year on October 11 in Brookville, New York. This tour consisted of thirty concerts in the United States. During the roué Dylan performed a five night run at the Beacon Theatre in New York City. The tour finally came to a close on November 18 at the Fox Theatre in Detroit, Michigan after ninety-three concerts.
1991	Never Ending Tour 1991	January 28 – November 20, 1991	101
The Never Ending Tour 1991 started with The Second Fastbreak Tour starting in late January. The tour started in the reverse of the original Fastbreak Tour, in the first tour Dylan started in North America and moved to Europe but in the 1991 tour Dylan started in Europe and finished in North America. Dylan continued his North American tour on October 24 in Corpus Christi, Texas. The tour continued through the Southern and Eastern United States coming to an end in Charlottesville, Virginia on November 20.
1992	Never Ending Tour 1992	March 18 – November 15, 1992	92
The Never Ending Tour 1992 started with a large tour of Oceania. Dylan performed nineteen concerts in Australia and one in New Zealand. There was a break in the tour after only five shows. During the break many major musical artists gathered at Madison Square Garden to recognize Bob Dylan's 30 years as a recording artist. Recorded on October 16, 1992 in New York City, the concert featured many artists performing classic Dylan songs, before ending with three songs from Dylan himself. The tour continued on October 23 and finally ending on November 15 at the South Florida show grounds in West Palm Beach, Florida.
1993	Never Ending Tour 1993	February 5 – October 9, 1993	76
The Never Ending Tour 1993 started on February 5 in Dublin, Ireland. On February 7 Dylan started a six show run at Hammersmith Apollo in London, England. Dylan performed four unplugged shows at The Supper Club in New York, playing two concerts on each day, one in the afternoon and the other in the evening. The tour came to an end after eighty shows, the second shortest tour of the Never Ending Tour.
1994	Never Ending Tour 1994	February 5 – November 13, 1994	104
The Never Ending Tour 1994 started with eleven concerts in Japan. Two days later Dylan performed in Malaysia, his first and to date, only concert there to date. Dylan then went on to perform concerts in Singapore and Hong Kong. Dylan continued his United States Tour on October 1 in Ithaca, New York. The tour continued through the fall in the eastern United States ending on November 13 in New Orleans, Louisiana. Inspired by the success of his appearance at Woodstock ’94 Dylan performed on MTV Unplugged which resulted in the live album "MTV Unplugged".
1995	Never Ending Tour 1995	March 11 – December 17, 1995	115
The Never Ending Tour 1995 started in early March in the Czech Republic. The tour moved onto Germany, the Netherlands, France and Belgium. Dylan performed a large number of concerts in the United Kingdom. The Never Ending Tour 1995 came to an end on December 17 in Philadelphia, Pennsylvania after one-hundred and sixteen shows.
1996	Never Ending Tour 1996	April 13 – November 23, 1996	84
The Never Ending Tour 1996 started on April 16 in Madison, New Jersey. The concerts mainly took place in the North-Eastern states of America, as well as four concerts in eastern Canada. There were originally plans to tour smaller club venues towards to the end of December, but these plans were shelved until the following year.
1997	Never Ending Tour 1997	February 9 – December 20, 1997	93
The Never Ending Tour 1997 started in Japan in February. The tour was made up of eleven dates including three in Tokyo and two in Osaka. The tour was interrupted in 1997 when Dylan was forced to cancel dates after suffering a serious medical issue in May. Columbia Records announced he was being hospitalized for a potentially fatal chest infection, histoplasmosis. Shortly after completing this tour, Dylan set out on tour again, this time performing in small club venues.
1998	Never Ending Tour 1998	January 13 – November 7, 1998	110
The Never Ending Tour 1998 started in North America with two performances in New London, Connecticut and five concerts at the Madison Square Theatre. In October Dylan toured North America without support from any other major act. He performed seven concerts in Canada and ten in the United States. The tour came to an end on November 7 in Atlanta, Georgia after one hundred and ten concerts.
1999	Never Ending Tour 1999	January 26 – November 20, 1999	119
The Never Ending Tour 1999 started in Fort Myers, Florida. This was the first time that Dylan had performed in Florida since 1995. On October 26 Dylan started a twenty date tour with Phil Lesh and Friends. The tour came to a close in Newark, Delaware on November 20.

== 2000s ==
Year(s)	Tour	Dates	Number of shows
2000	Never Ending Tour 2000	March 10 – November 19, 2000	112
The 2000 Never Ending Tour started in North America with two performances in one day at the Anaheim Sun Theatre in Anaheim, California on March 10. The tour came to a close in Towson, Maryland on November 19 at the Towson State University after one-hundred and twelve shows.
2001	Never Ending Tour 2001	February 25 – November 24, 2001	106
The Never Ending Tour 2001 started in Japan, where Dylan had not performed since 1997. Dylan then toured Australia where he had not played since 1998. Dylan returned to North America to perform concerts in August including several concerts at State Fairs. The United States Summer Tour came to an end on August 25 in Lancaster, California. Dylan returned to touring on October 5 in Spokane, Washington and ended in Boston on November 24. This was Dylan's 23rd performance in Boston.
2002	Never Ending Tour 2002	January 31 – November 22, 2002	107
The Never Ending Tour 2002 started in Florida, where Dylan had not performed since September 1999. After completing his US summer tour Dylan performed a round tour of the United States starting in Seattle, Washington on October 4 and coming to an end Fairfax, Virginia on November 22. It was after this last performance that Charlie Sexton left Bob Dylan's band. He returned to Dylan's band line-up in the Fall of 2009.
2003	Never Ending Tour 2003	February 6 – November 25, 2003	98
The 2003 tour started with eleven concerts in Oceania, seven being in Australia and four being in New Zealand. There were originally plans to continue this tour into Japan but these plans were abandoned. The tour came to an end in London, England at the Brixton Academy. He had also performed in London the previous two nights at the Shepherds Bush Empire and the Hammersmith Apollo.
2004	Never Ending Tour 2004	February 28 – November 27, 2004	111
The 2004 tour started with a spring tour of the United States. Dylan performed several residencies during the tour. Then on October 13 Dylan commenced the final leg of the tour performing in College sports venues across the United States. The tour started on October 13 in San Francisco, California and ended in Allston, Massachusetts, on November 21.
2005	Never Ending Tour 2005	March 7 – November 27, 2005	113
In 2005, Dylan toured the United States with Merle Haggard. The tour included several residencies at various venues. Dylan returned to Europe after 15 months in the fall of 2005. He performed 31 shows over the space of two months covering 13 countries and 27 cities. The tour started in Stockholm, Sweden on October 17 and finished on November 27 in Dublin, Ireland.
2006	Never Ending Tour 2006	April 1 – November 20, 2006	99
The tour started off in Reno, Nevada at the Reno Events Center. Dylan once again toured North America in the fall of 2006 performing 24 concerts in the United States and five concerts in Canada. This leg of the tour started on October 11 in Vancouver, British Columbia and ended in New York City on November 20.
2007	Never Ending Tour 2007	March 27 – October 29, 2007	98
The tour started off in Europe in a small venue called Debaser Medis in Stockholm, Sweden and continued on to the Globe Arena and the rest of Europe. Dylan traveled back from Oceania to perform a further thirty-one concerts in the United States. This leg of the tour also contained Dylan's 2000th performance on the Never Ending Tour. This date was October 16 at the Nutter Center in Fairborn, Ohio.
2008	Never Ending Tour 2008	February 2 – November 21, 2008	97
The tour started with three shows at the House of Blues in Dallas, Texas before performing in Latin America and South America. Dylan and the band continued to tour North America throughout the fall of 2008 where the tour finally came to a close on November 21, 2008 at the United Palace Theater in New York City after ninety-seven concerts.
2009	Never Ending Tour 2009	March 22 – November 19, 2009	97
The tour started in Stockholm, Sweden at an intimate concert at Berns Salonger. Dylan performed five concerts in England. One of which was at the Roundhouse in London which was a concert especially for the members of the BobDylan.com fan club. During the fall tour Dylan and his band performed three concerts at several venues during the tour including the Hollywood Palladium, Aragon Ballroom, Wang Theatre and United Palace Theater where the tour ended on November 19.

== 2010s ==
Year(s)	Tour	Dates	Number of shows
2010	Never Ending Tour 2010	March 11 – November 27, 2010	102
The tour started off with 14 shows in Japan including a seven show run at the Zepp in Tokyo, Japan before moving on to a concert in South Korea, the first he had performed there. The tour came to a close in Mashantucket, Connecticut on November 27 after 102 shows.
2011	Never Ending Tour 2011	April 3 – November 21, 2011	89
The tour started off with a concert in Taiwan, the first of Dylan's career. Then he, along with his band, performed two concerts in China, one in Beijing and one in Shanghai. Dylan returned to Europe in the fall of the year to perform a string of concerts with Mark Knopfler.
2012	Never Ending Tour 2012	April 15 – November 21, 2012	86
The first dates to be announced were concerts taking place in three South American Countries; Brazil, Argentina and Chile. Dylan previously visited these countries last time he toured South America. Performing only 86 concerts in 2012, Dylan performed the fewest shows during a year long leg of the Never Ending Tour since 1996.
2013	Never Ending Tour 2013	April 5 – November 28, 2013	85
The 2013 tour marked the Never Ending Tour's 25th Anniversary. Thirteen dates for the first leg, in North America, were announced at Dylan's official website on February 27, 2013. A summer tour of the US was announced in April 2013 called the Americanarama Festival of Music. Dylan's official website announced a European tour taking place between October and November on June 13, 2013.
2014	Never Ending Tour 2014	March 31 – December 3, 2014	92
The first leg of the tour taking place solely in Japan was announced on Christmas Eve 2013. The final leg of the tour, taking place in North America throughout the autumn/early winter was announced on August 27.
2015	Never Ending Tour 2015	April 10 – November 22, 2015	87
The first leg of the tour taking place solely in North America was announced on February 12, 2015, With several dates in Memphis, Tulsa, Kansas City and St. Louis being announced in the following days and weeks. Dylan planned an extensive tour of Europe split between the summer and fall. During the summer Dylan and his band performed mainly at festivals and large arenas. During the fall Dylan and his band performed mainly in theatres and mid-sized arenas, including a five-night residency at the Royal Albert Hall in London. His performances at the Royal Albert Hall were awarded a five-star review from the Financial Times and his performances at the O2 Apollo in Manchester were given a four-star rating by the Manchester Evening News.
2016	Never Ending Tour 2016	April 4 – November 23, 2016	75
Bob Dylan's eighth tour of Japan was announced via his official website on December 22, 2015. The tour was slated to take place throughout April covering several major Japanese cities including Tokyo and Osaka. On March 22, 2016, it was announced that Dylan, among others, would headline the Ravinia Festival in Highland Park, Illinois, during the summer. A full U.S. summer tour was announced on Dylan's official website on March 7, 2016, beginning in Woodinville, Washington, on June 4 and ending in Guilford, New Hampshire, on July 17, in support of Dylan's upcoming album Fallen Angels. On May 3, 2016, it was officially confirmed that Dylan, with his band, would perform at Desert Trip, a festival at the Empire Polo Club in Indio, California, featuring performers from the 1960s and 1970s. Dylan was to share the bill with The Rolling Stones, Paul McCartney, Neil Young, Roger Waters and The Who. Following the two Desert Trip performances, Dylan and his band embarked on a complete twenty-seven date tour, throughout the Eastern, Southern and Western United States; this was announced via Dylan's official website on August 8, 2016. The 2016 tour comprised seventy-five concerts, the fewest concerts Dylan performed in a year since the Never Ending Tour's début in 1988, when he also performed seventy-five concerts.
2017	Never Ending Tour 2017	April 1 – November 25, 2017	84
The first leg of the tour taking place solely in North America was announced on February 12, 2015, With several dates in Memphis, Tulsa, Kansas City and St. Louis being announced in the following days and weeks.
2018	Never Ending Tour 2018	March 22 – December 3, 2018	84
Six concerts taking place in the United Kingdom in May 2017 were announced at BobDylan.com on December 8, 2016. The following day a concert at the 3Arena in Dublin was announced for May 11. Further mainland Europe concerts including Stockholm and Antwerp were announced on December 12. On January 27, 2017, it was announced that Dylan would be performing at the fan-curated Firefly Music Festival, taking place at The Woodlands at Dover International Speedway in Dover, Delaware. On March 20, 2017, a further five concerts in the United States were announced, along with eighteen concerts taking place in Canada during the summer of 2017. These concerts included the first-ever concert to take place at The Hutton Brickyards in Kingston, New York, and Dylan's first concert appearance at Edmonton's new Rogers Place arena.
2019	Never Ending Tour 2019	March 31 – December 8, 2019	77
The first concert of 2019 was announced on November 27, 2018. Also on November 27, concerts in Finland, Sweden and Norway were confirmed by local news outlets. On January 27, 2017, it was announced that Dylan would be performing at the fan-curated Firefly Music Festival, taking place at The Woodlands at Dover International Speedway in Dover, Delaware. On March 20, A twenty-six date tour of North America was announced on September 9, 2019. These shows were mainly scheduled for College and University venues with Dylan also returning to the Met Philadelphia for the second year running. On September 23, a ten-date residency was announced for New York City's Beacon Theatre starting on November 23 and coming to an end on December 6, 2019.

== 2020s ==
Rough and Rowdy Ways World Wide Tour

== Non-Tour performances ==
=== 1950s ===
==== 1956 ====
Date	Venue	Location
December 24, 1956	Terlinde Music	Saint Paul, Minnesota, United States
No recording of this session is circulating.

==== 1958 ====
Date	Venue	Location
Spring 1958	The Home of Robert Zimmerman	Hibbing, Minnesota, United States
A fragment of "Hey Little Richard" was released on No Direction Home. (July 2005). "Lilly Lou" (Joe T. Cook) was released on Biography: Bob Dylan, American Troubadour. (October 2000).

==== 1959 ====
Date	Venue	Location
January 10, 1959	Hibbing High School	Hibbing, Minnesota, United States
A performance at the dance following the Hibbing International Falls basketball game.
May 1959	The Home of Ric Kangas	Hibbing, Minnesota, United States
"When I Got Troubles" released on "The Bootleg Series Vol. 7: No Direction Home: The Soundtrack". (August 2005). Fragment of "Teen Love Serenade" was released on Biography: Bob Dylan, American Troubadour. (October 2000).

=== 1960s ===
==== 1960 ====
Date	Venue	Location
May 1, 1960	The Home of Karen Wallace	Saint Paul, Minnesota, United States
Songs performed: "Gotta Travel On)", "Doney Gal", "Roving Gambler", "Go Down You Murderers", "Bay of Mexico", "The Two Sisters", "Go Way from My Window", "This Land Is Your Land", "Go Tell It to the Mountain", "Fare Thee Well", "Pastures of Plenty", "Saro Jane", "Take This Hammer", "Nobody Loves When You're Down and Out", "Great Historical Bum", "Mary Ann", "Every Night When the Sun Goes In", "Sinner Man", "Delia", "Wop De Alano", "Who's Gonna Shoe Your Pretty Little Feet?", "Amber Young", "500 Miles", "Blues Yodel No. 8", "One-Eyed Jacks", "Columbus Stockade Blues" and "Payday at Coal Creek".
June 1, 1960	The Purple Onion	Saint Paul, Minnesota, United States
Songs performed: "Go Down You Murderers", "Sinner Man", "House of the Rising Sun", "Timber", "Jerry", "Another Man Done Gone", "Black Jack Blues", "Man of Constant Sorrow", "One Eyed Jacks", "Greyhound Blues" and "Every Time I Hear the Spirit".
September 1960	The Home of Bob Dylan	Hibbing, Minnesota, United States
Songs performed: "Red Rosey Bush", "Johnny I Hardly Knew Ye", "Jesus Christ", "Streets of Glory", "K.C. Moan", "Blues Yodel No. 8", "I am a Gambler", "Talking Columbia", "Talking Merchant Marine", "Talking Hugh Brown", "Talking Inflation", "Come See Jerusalem" and "San Francisco Bay Blues".

==== 1961 ====
Date	Venue	Location
February 1, 1961	The Home of Bob and Sid Gleason	East Orange, New Jersey, United States
Songs performed: "San Francisco Bay Blues", "Jesus Met The Woman at the Well", "Gypsy Davey", "Pastures of Plenty", "On the Trail of the Buffalo", "Jesse James", "Riding in My Car (Car Song)", "Southern Cannonball", "Bring Me Back, My Blue-Eyed Boy" and "Remember Me".
May 1, 1961	The Home of Bonnie Beecher	Minneapolis, Minnesota, United States
Songs performed: "Railroad Bill", "Will the Circle Be Unbroken?", "Man of Constant Sorrow", "Pretty Polly", "Railroad Boy", "James Alley Blues", "Why'd You Cut My Hair?", "This Land Is Your Land", "Two Trains Runnin'", "Wild Mountain Thyme", "Howdido", "Riding in My Car (Car Song)", "Don't Push Me Down", "Come See", "I Want My Milk", "San Francisco Bay Blues", "A Long Time A-Growin'", "Devilish Mary", "Ramblin' Round", "Death Don't Have No Mercy", "It's Hard to Be Blind", "This Train", "Talking Fish Blues" and "Pastures of Plenty".
May 6, 1961	Montewese Hotel	Branford, Connecticut, United States
Part of the Indian Neck Folk Festival. Songs performed: "Talking Columbia", "Hangknot, Slipknot" and "Talking Fish Blues".
May 1961	Unknown Coffeehouse	Minneapolis, Minnesota, United States
Songs performed: "Ramblin' Round", "Death Don't Have No Mercy", "It's Hard to Be Blind", "This Train", "Talking Fish Blues", "Pastures of Plenty" and "This Land is Your Land", "Two Trains Runnin'", "Wild Mountain Thyme", "Howdido", "Riding in My Car (Car Song)", "Don't Push Me Down", "Come See", "I Want My Milk", "San Francisco Bay Blues", "A Long Time A-Growin'", "Devilish Mary", "Railroad Bill", "Will the Circle Be Unbroken", "Man of Constant Sorrow", "Pretty Polly", "Railroad Boy", "James Alley Blues", "Bonnie, Why'd You Cut My Hair?".
July 29, 1961	Riverside Church	New York City, United States
Part of '12-hour Hootenanny Special: Saturday Of Folk Music'. Songs performed: "Handsome Molly", "Naomi Wise", "Poor Lazarus", "Mean Old Southern Railroad" and "Acne".
September 6, 1961	The Gaslight Cafe	New York City, United States
Songs performed: "Man on the Street", "He Was a Friend of Mine", "Talkin' Bear Mountain Picnic Massacre Blues", "Song to Woody", "Pretty Polly" and "Riding in My Car (Car Song)".
September 30, 1961	Gerde's Folk City	New York City, United States
Songs performed: "San Francisco Bay Blues", "The Great Divide", "See That My Grave Is Kept Clean", "Ain't No More Cane", "Dink's Song", "Pretty Boy Floyd", "In the Pines" and "Sally Gal".
October 29, 1961	WNYC Radio Studio	New York City, United States
Songs performed: "Sally Girl" and "The Girl I Left Behind".
October 31, 1961	Folklore Center	New York City, United States
Part of Izzy Young's Folklore Center Party. Songs performed: "Fixin' to Die Blues".
November 4, 1961	Carnegie Chapter Hall	New York City, United States
Songs performed: "Pretty Peggy-O", "In the Pines", "Gospel Plow", "1913 Massacre", "Backwater Blues", "A Long Time a-Growin'", "Fixin' to Die Blues", "San Francisco Bay Blues", "Riding in My Car (Car Song)", "Talkin' Bear Mountain Picnic Massacre Blues", "Man on the Street", "Sally Gal", "This Land is Your Land", "Talking Merchant Marine", "Black Cross", "He Was a Friend of Mine", "Pretty Polly", "House of the Rising Sun", "The Cuckoo is a Pretty Bird", "Freight Train Blues", "Song to Woody" and "Talkin' New York".
November 23, 1961	The Home of Eve and Mac McKenzie	New York City, United States
Songs performed: "Hard Times in New York Town", "The Wayfaring Stranger", "(It Makes) A Long Time Man Feel Bad", "Lonesome Whistle Blues", "Worried Blues", "Baby of Mine", "Baby, Let Me Follow You Down", "Fixin' to Die Blues", "San Francisco Bay Blues", "You're No Good", "House of the Rising Sun" and "This Land is Your Land".
December 4, 1961	The Home of Eve and Mac McKenzie	New York City, United States
Songs performed: "Roll in My Sweet Baby's Arms", "The Bells of Rhymney", "Come All You Fair and Tender Ladies", "Roll in My Sweet Baby's Arms", "The Bells of Rhymney", "Highway 51" and "This Land is Your Land".
December 22, 1961	The Home of Bonnie Beecher	Minneapolis, Minnesota, United States
Songs performed: "Candy Man", "Baby, Please Don't Go", "Hard Times in New York Town", "Stealin'", "Poor Lazarus", "I Ain't Got No Home", "It's Hard to Be Blind", "Dink's Song", "Man of Constant Sorrow", "Story of East Orange", "Naomi Wise", "Wade in the Water", "I Was Young When I Left Home", "In the Evening", "Baby, Let Me Follow You Down", "Sally Gal", "Gospel Plow", "Long John", "Cocaine", "VD Blues", "VD Waltz", "VD City", "VD Gunner's Blues", "See That My Grave Is Kept Clean", "Ramblin' Round" and "Black Cross".

==== 1962 ====
Date	Venue	Location
January 13, 1962	WBAI Studios; Cynthia Gooding Radio Show	New York City, United States
Songs performed: "Lonesome Whistle Blues", "Fixin' to Die", "Smokestack Lightning", "Hard Travelin'", "The Death of Emmett Till", "Standing on the Highway", "Roll On, John", "Stealin', Stealin'", "Long Time Man", "Baby Please Don't Go", "Hard Times in New York Town".
January 29, 1962	The Home Of Eve and Mac MacKenzie	New York City, United States
Songs performed: "Hard Times In New York Town", "The Death Of Emmett Till".
March 1962	Cynthia Gooding's Apartment	New York City, United States
Songs performed: "Ballad of Donald White", "Wichita (Going to Louisiana)", "Acne", "Rocks and Gravel", "Long Time Man".
April 16, 1962	Gerde's Folk City	New York City, United States
Songs performed: "Honey, Just Allow Me One More Chance", "Talkin' New York", "Corrina Corrina", "Deep Ellem Blues", "Blowin' in the Wind".
May 1962	WBAI Studios; Broadside Show	New York City, United States
Songs performed: "Ballad of Donald White", "The Death of Emmett Till", "Blowin' in the Wind".
May 1962	Gerde's Fok City	New York City, United States
Songs performed: "Talkin' Bear Mountain Picnic Massacre Blues", "Song to Woody".
July 2, 1962	Finjan Club	Montreal, Quebec, Canada
Songs performed: "The Death of Emmett Till", "Stealin', Stealin'", "Hiram Hubbard", "Blowin' in the Wind", "Rocks and Gravel", "Quit Your Low Down Ways", "He Was a Friend of Mine", "Let Me Die in My Footsteps", "Two Trains Runnin'", "Ramblin' on My Mind", "Blues Yodel No. 8".
August 11, 1962	The Home of Dave Whitaker	Minneapolis, Minnesota, United States
Songs performed: "Tomorrow is a Long Time", "This Land is Your Land", "Talking Hypocrite", "Motherless Children", "Worried Blues", "Long Time Gone", "Deep Ellem Blues".
September 22, 1962	Carnegie Hall	New York City, United States
Songs performed: "Sally Gal", "Highway 51", "Talking John Birch Paranoid Blues", "Ballad of Hollis Brown", "A Hard Rain's a-Gonna Fall".
September 1962	The Home of Eve and Mac MacKenzie	New York City, United States
Songs performed: "See That My Grave is Kept Clean", "Ballad of Donald White", "A Hard Rain's a-Gonna Fall", "James Alley Blues".
October 1962	WBAI Studios; Billy Faier Show	New York City, United States
Songs performed: "Baby Let Me Follow You Down", "Talking John Birch Paranoid Blues", "The Death of Emmett Till", Make Me a Pallet on Your Floor".
October 15, 1962	Gaslight Café	New York City, United States
Songs performed: "Barbara Allen", "A Hard Rain's a-Gonna Fall", "Don't Think Twice, It's All Right", "Black Cross", "No More Auction Block", "Rocks and Gravel", "Moonshiner", "John Brown", "Ballad of Hollis Brown", "See That My Grave is Kept Clean", "Cocaine", "Cuckoo is a Pretty Bird", "Ain't No More Cane", "Motherless Children", "Handsome Molly", "Kindhearted Woman Blues", "West Texas".

=== 2000s ===
==== 2002 ====
Date	Venue	Location
February 27, 2002	Staples Center	Los Angeles, California, United States
Part of the 44th Annual Grammy Awards. "Cry a While" was performed. Dylan was nominated for three awards and won one.

==== 2004 ====
Date	Venue	Location
March 28, 2004	Apollo Theater	New York City, United States
Part of NBC TV program Apollo at 70: A Hot Night In Harlem. "A Change Is Gonna Come" by Sam Cooke was performed twice.
May 5, 2004	Wiltern Theatre	Los Angeles, California, United States
Part of TV special Willie Nelson & Friends: Outlaws and Angels. "You Win Again" by Hank Williams was performed.
June 7, 2004	Apollo Theater	New York City, United States
Part of Jazz at Lincoln Center's 2004 Spring Gala. "It Takes A Lot To Laugh, It Takes A Train To Cry" and "Don't Think Twice, It's All Right" were performed.

==== 2005 ====
Date	Venue	Location
July 4, 2005	North Forty Field	Fort Worth, Texas, United States
Part of Willie Nelson's July 4 Picnic. Songs performed: "Drifter's Escape", "I'll Be Your Baby Tonight", "Absolutely Sweet Marie", "You Win Again", "Highway 61 Revisited", "Shooting Star", "Cold Irons Bound", "Like a Rolling Stone", "All Along the Watchtower".
July 16, 2005	Benaroya Hall	Seattle, Washington, United States
Part of Amazon.com 10th Anniversary Event. Songs performed: "Maggie's Farm", "Tell Me That It Isn't True", "I'll Be Your Baby Tonight", "Lay Lady Lay", "Most Likely You Go Your Way (And I'll Go Mine)", "Blind Willie McTell", "Watching The River Flow", "Ballad Of A Thin Man", "I Shall Be Released".

==== 2009 ====
Date	Venue	Location
June 11, 2009	Stage 15, Sony Pictures Studio	Culver City, California, United States
Part of the American Film Institute Lifetime Achievement Award – Tribute To Michael Douglas. Dylan and his band performed "Things Have Changed", which had featured in Douglas' film Wonder Boys.

=== 2010s ===
==== 2010 ====
Date	Venue	Location
February 11, 2010	The White House	Washington, D.C., United States
Dylan delivered a jaw-dropping acoustic rendition of his 1963 civil rights anthem, "The Times They Are a-Changin'" and then walked to the front row to shake President Obama's hand. It was the first time they ever met, even though Dylan (in an extremely uncharacteristic move) thoroughly praised Obama during the 2008 campaign. The performance was part of A Celebration of Music From the Civil Rights Movement.

==== 2011 ====
Date	Venue	Location
February 13, 2011	Staples Center	Los Angeles, California, United States
Less than a week before the 53rd Grammys take place, the award ceremony has announced that Bob Dylan make his fifth-ever Grammy appearance. He also performed with Mumford & Sons and The Avett Brothers. The banjo-heavy back-up music to his rendition of "Maggie's Farm" showed that his songs can still sound fresh and new, even decades after they were first released.

==== 2012 ====
Date	Venue	Location
January 12, 2012	Hollywood Palladium	Los Angeles, California, United States
This performance was part of the Critics' Choice Movie Award honoring Martin Scorsese and his contribution to media. Dylan and his band were introduced by Olivia Harrison and then performed "Blind Willie McTell", which was used in Scorsese's PBS documentary series The Blues.

==== 2014 ====
Date	Venue	Location
November 23, 2014	Academy of Music	Philadelphia, Pennsylvania, United States
Playing to an audience of one (Fredrik Wikingsson), Dylan and his band abandoned their usual repertoire and played Buddy Holly's "Heartbeat", Fats Domino's "Blueberry Hill", Chuck Willis' "It's Too Late (She's Gone)" and a blues jam. The incredible concert was part of an ongoing Swedish film series Experiment Ensam (Experiment Alone), where people experience things completely alone that are usually reserved for large crowds. Dylan's set list has been remarkably rigid over the past year, centering largely around songs released in the past 15 years. Covers are extremely rare, so Wikingsson was delighted when the show began with "Heartbeat". Wikingsson's private Dylan show was filmed by eight cameras, and a 15-minute documentary of the event was published on YouTube on December 15, 2014.

==== 2015 ====
Date	Venue	Location
May 19, 2015	Ed Sullivan Theater	New York City, United States
For the final scheduled musical guest in David Letterman's Late Show history, the retiring host welcomed Bob Dylan, who he considers "the greatest songwriter of modern times". Dylan, making a rare late-night television appearance, performed "The Night We Called It a Day" a single off his Sinatra-inspired 2015 LP Shadows in the Night. Dylan last visited Letterman in November 1993, just months after the Late Show launched. While fans likely hoped for a more popular selection from the Dylan songbook, the jazz standard fit perfectly with the reflective mood of the evening. Dylan crooned just 24 hours before the curtain closes on Letterman's Late Show after 22 years and a career in late-night television that spans 33 years.
