= Wolfbrook Arena =

Sporting arena in Christchurch, New Zealand

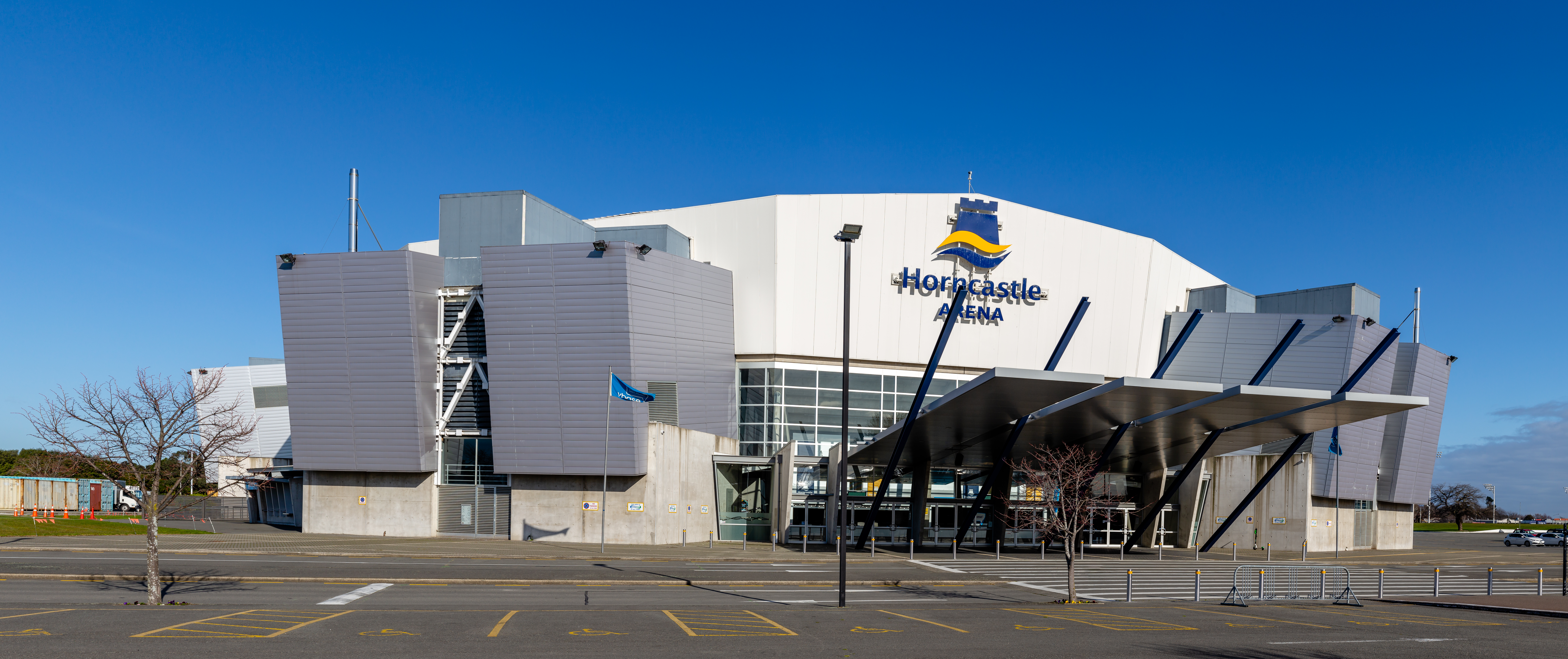
- The arena, under old signage, in August 2019
- Interactive map of Wolfbrook Arena
- Former names: Westpac Trust Centre (1998–2007); Westpac Arena (2007–2010); CBS Canterbury Arena (2010–2014); Horncastle Arena (2014–2020); Christchurch Arena (2020–2023)
- Address: 55 Jack Hinton Drive; Addington 8024; Christchurch; New Zealand
- Location: 55 Jack Hinton Drive; Addington, Christchurch; Canterbury, New Zealand
- Coordinates: 43°32′45″S 172°36′4″E
- Owner: Venues Ōtautahi
- Operator: Venues Ōtautahi
- Capacity: Netball: 7,200; Concerts: 9,000

Construction
- Opened: 12 September 1998
- General contractor: Charles Luney

Tenants
- Christchurch Sirens (WNBL) (2007); Canterbury Flames (National Bank Cup) (2002–2007); Canterbury Rams (NZNBL) (1999–2007); Mainland Tactix (ANZ Championship) (2008–present); New Zealand Breakers (NBL) (2003–2004, 2019-2025); 1999 World Netball Championships

Wolfbrook Arena is an indoor arena in Christchurch, New Zealand. It is located in the suburb of Addington. Opened in September 1998, it has gone through a series of name changes, most recently in 2023, when Wolfbrook Property Group purchased the naming rights. When it does not have a naming rights partner, the venue is known as Christchurch Arena

== Description ==
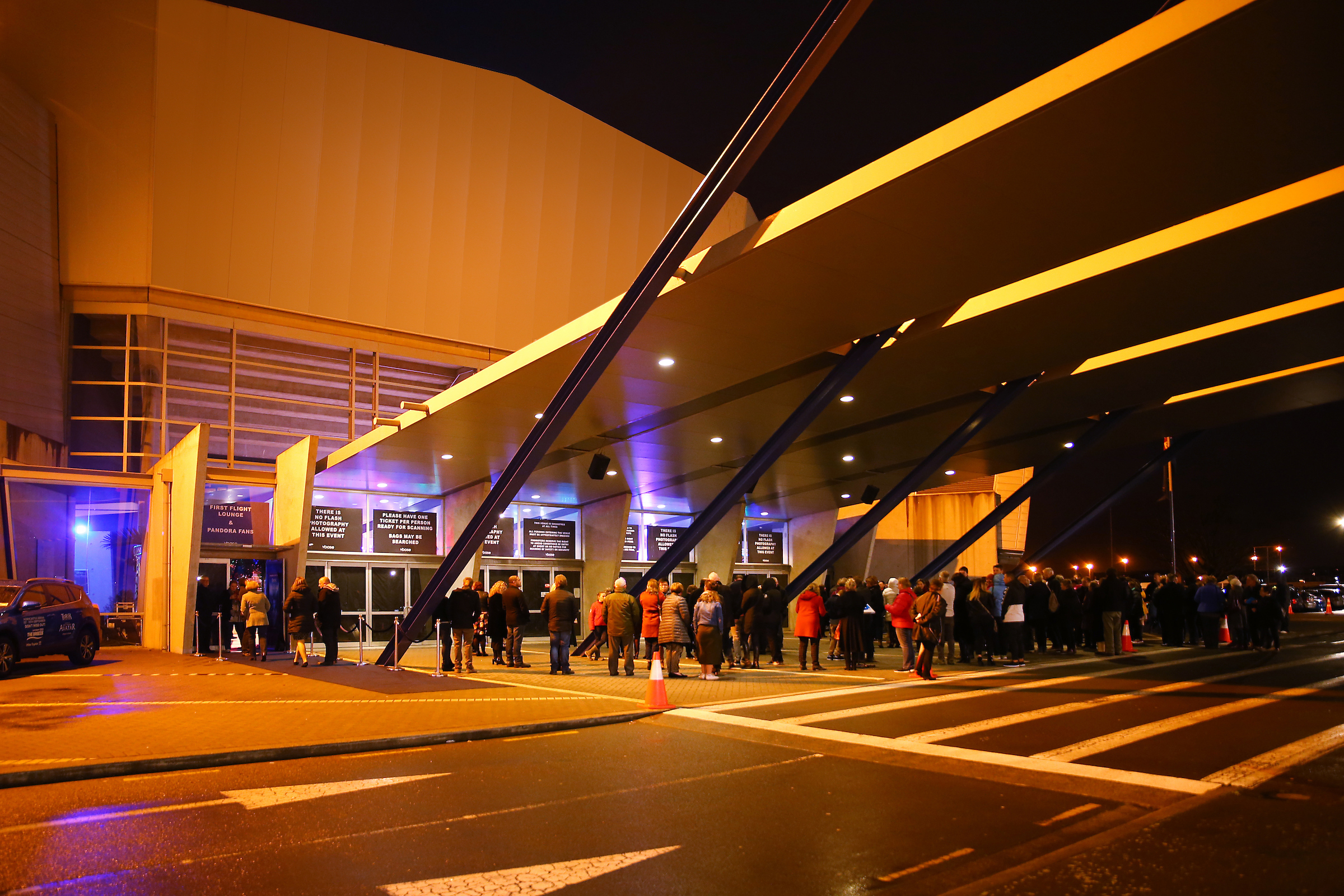
Main entrance of the arena (2020)

Wolfbrook Arena is New Zealand's second-largest indoor arena, with a maximum capacity of 9,000 (depending on event type); it was the largest until the construction of Auckland's Vector Arena in 2007. The indoor stadium hosts concerts, exhibitions and sporting events. Provision for international sport and traditional indoor arena events was integrated into the design requirements. It has over 6,700 seats for sporting fixtures, which can increase to over 7,000 for concerts.

The Sports and Entertainment complex is located adjacent to the Addington Raceway and Christchurch Stadium and is surrounded by 3,000 car parking spaces. The complex is only 10 minutes from the city centre.

It has been affectionately dubbed 'The Woolshed' by Canterbury Rams basketball fans. Some Christchurch citizens colloquially refer to the arena as the horseshoe, due to its unusual architectural exterior design.

== History ==
Construction company Chas S Luney Ltd built the stadium. The arena opened in September 1998 at a cost of NZ$32 million. In the first ever sporting match at CBS Canterbury Arena, the Canterbury Rams basketball team suffered a close loss to the Wellington Saints 86–81 in April 1999.

It was built for two main reasons: primarily for the 1999 Netball World Cup in Christchurch, and also because Christchurch was missing out on many concerts and other attractions because it did not have a suitable indoor arena in the city.

Westpac Arena, which had previously been named WestpacTrust Centre, was renamed CBS Canterbury Arena on 18 June 2010. It was renamed Horncastle Arena on 23 July 2014, then Christchurch Arena on 19 September 2020. It was renamed Wolfbrook Arena, after sponsor Wolfbrook Property Group, on 1 June 2023.

== Sporting home teams ==
- Canterbury Rams (1999–2007)
- Christchurch Sirens (2007)
- Canterbury Flames (2002–2007)
- Mainland Tactix (2008–present)

== Events ==
=== Entertainment events ===
Entertainment events at Christchurch Arena
Year	Date	Nationalities	Artists	Events
1998	12 September	United States	Bob Dylan	Never Ending Tour 1998
1998	27 November	United States	Janet Jackson	The Velvet Rope Tour
1998	28 November	United States	Janet Jackson	The Velvet Rope Tour
1999	14 August	United States	Creed	
2002	27 November	United States	P!nk	Party Tour
2003	18 February	United Kingdom	Cliff Richard	Wanted World Tour
2003	19 February	United Kingdom	Cliff Richard	Wanted World Tour
2005	22 February	United States	Cher	Living Proof: The Farewell Tour
2005	6 October	United States	Black Eyed Peas	Monkey Business Tour
2005	20 November	United States	Kelly Clarkson	Breakaway World Tour
2007	3 July	United States	Guns N' Roses	Chinese Democracy World Tour
2007	8 August	United States	Bob Dylan	Never Ending Tour 2007
2007	15 September	United Kingdom	Snow Patrol	Eyes Open Tour
2007	16 October	Australia	Powderfinger; Silverchair	Across the Great Divide Tour
2007	25 November	United Kingdom	Muse	Black Holes and Revelations Tour
2008	7 May	Ireland	Westlife	Back Home Tour
2008	12 September	United States	Disturbed	Indestructible Tour (Music as a Weapon)
2008	28 October	United States	Stevie Wonder	Wonder Spring Summer World Tour 2008
2009	22 February	United Kingdom	Iron Maiden	Somewhere Back in Time World Tour
2010	16 February	United States	Faith No More	The Second Coming Tour
2010	1 March	United Kingdom	Cliff Richard; The Shadows	The Final Reunion Tour
2010	5 March	United States	Paramore	Brand New Eyes World Tour
2010	8 April	United States	Carole King; James Taylor	Troubadour Reunion Tour
2010	21 September	United States	Metallica; The Sword	World Magnetic Tour (Metallica); Warp Riders Tour (The Sword)
2010	22 September	United States	Metallica; The Sword	World Magnetic Tour (Metallica); Warp Riders Tour (The Sword)
2010	3 November	Canada	Leonard Cohen	Leonard Cohen Tour 2008–2010
2011	10 February	United Kingdom	Sting – along with the New Zealand Symphony Orchestra.	Symphonicity Tour
2011	10 May	United States	Disturbed	Asylum Tour
2011	20 November	New Zealand	Hayley Westenra	Paradiso 10th Anniversary Homecoming Tour
2012	10 April	Australia	Reece Mastin	Australia and New Zealand Tour
2012	19 August	United States	Slash	Apocalyptic Love World Tour
2012	6 November	United Kingdom	Mumford & Sons	—N/a
2013	20 February	United States	Macklemore & Ryan Lewis	—N/a Note: This show was organised as a student-only event by the University of Canterbury Students' Association, it was originally planned to be held at the Ilam Gardens but the event has since been re-located to allow extra tickets to be sold.
2013	23 February	Australia	Reece Mastin	The Summer Nights Tour
2013	10 October	Ireland; United Kingdom	One Direction	Take Me Home Tour
2013	14 December	Canada	Leonard Cohen	Old Ideas World Tour
2014	20 March	United States	Lionel Richie	All the Hits, All Night Long
2014	22 March	United States	Nine Inch Nails	Twenty Thirteen Tour
2014	10 September	United States	Bob Dylan	Never Ending Tour 2014
2015	8 April	United Kingdom	Ed Sheeran	x Tour
2015	21 April	Puerto Rico	Ricky Martin	One World Tour
2015	10 September	United States	Imagine Dragons	Smoke + Mirrors Tour
2015	2 October	United States	Maroon 5	Maroon V Tour
2016	29 April	United Kingdom	Iron Maiden	The Book of Souls World Tour
2016	28 July	Australia	Troye Sivan	Blue Neighbourhood Tour
2016	30 July	United States	Macklemore & Ryan Lewis	The Unruly Mess I've Made Tour
2016	18 August (1 Show)	—N/a		Disney on Ice: Magical Ice Festival
2016	19 August (2 Shows)	—N/a		Disney on Ice: Magical Ice Festival
2016	20 August (3 Shows)	—N/a		Disney on Ice: Magical Ice Festival
2016	21 August (3 Shows)	—N/a		Disney on Ice: Magical Ice Festival
2016	29 September	United Kingdom	Ellie Goulding	Delirium World Tour
2018	24 April	United States	The Killers	Wonderful Wonderful World Tour
2020	5 March	Norway	A-ha	Hunting High and Low Live Tour
2022	25 November	United States	The Killers	Imploding the Mirage Tour
2024	23 October	United Kingdom	Thom Yorke	Everything (tour)
2025	15 May	United States	ZZ Top	Elevation Tour
2025	26 April	United States	Toto	Dogz of Oz Tour
2025	7 October	United States	Teddy Swims	
2025	30 November	Scotland	Lewis Capaldi	
2026	13 February	New Zealand	Lorde	Ultrasound World Tour
2026	21 August	United States	Alex Warren	Finding Family on the Road
2026	22 August	United States	Alex Warren	Finding Family on the Road
2026	7 November	New Zealand	Stan Walker	A Symphonic Experience
2026	21 November	United States	Rise Against and Dropkick Murphys	
2027	1 March	Scotland	Simple Minds	V Tour 2027
2027	12 March	Canada	Bryan Adams	Roll with the Punches World Tour
2027	30 July	Ireland	Westlife	The 25th Anniversary World Tour
2027	31 July	Ireland	Westlife	The 25th Anniversary World Tour

=== Sporting ===
It has hosted a number of different sporting events, including home matches for the Canterbury Rams (basketball), New Zealand Breakers (basketball) and Mainland Tactix (netball) teams. It occasionally hosts international basketball and netball fixtures featuring the Tall Blacks and Silver Ferns respectively. It was the host of the 1999 Netball World Championships. It has hosted many non-regular sporting events, including various celebrity tennis matches, ice shows, disabled games, karate championships and gymnastics competitions.

In 2007 and 2008 the arena hosted WWE professional wrestling tours, featuring the SmackDown and ECW brands. It again hosted a WWE event in September 2017, this time a Raw branded event.

=== Other uses ===
The arena plays a key role in the Christchurch economy, hosting annual trade shows, including the Christchurch Home Show, Women's Lifestyle Expo, Armageddon Expo, and the Go Green Expo.

Christchurch Arena is managed by Venues Otautahi, the venue management company that also manages the Christchurch Town Hall, Apollo Projects Stadium, Airforce Museum of New Zealand and Hagley Oval Pavilion and One New Zealand Stadium. The combined facilities regularly host a variety of different events.

The venue is also used for big gala dinners, lunches, balls, and cocktail parties.

== See also ==
- List of indoor arenas in New Zealand
