= Never Ending Tour 1997 =

1997 concert tour by Bob Dylan

- Tour by Bob Dylan
- Poster to the concert in Saint Paul, Minnesota
- Start date: February 9, 1997
- End date: December 20, 1997
- Legs: 6
- No. of shows: 11 in Asia; 78 in North America; 4 in Europe; 93 in Total

Bob Dylan concert chronology
- Never Ending Tour 1996 (1996); Never Ending Tour 1997 (1997); Never Ending Tour 1998 (1998)

The Never Ending Tour is the popular name for Bob Dylan's endless touring schedule since June 7, 1988.

== Information ==
The Never Ending Tour 1997 started in Japan in February. The tour was made up of eleven dates including three in Tokyo and two in Osaka.

Dylan travelled to North America to perform six concerts in Canada and nineteen concerts in the United States in the spring, including a performance at the Memphis In May festival on May 2. The tour ended in Huntsville, Alabama the following day.

The tour was interrupted in 1997 when Dylan was forced to cancel dates after suffering a serious medical issue in May. Columbia Records announced he was being hospitalized for a potentially fatal chest infection, histoplasmosis. Dylan continued to tour the United States throughout August.

In early October Dylan and the band travelled to the United Kingdom to perform three concerts in England and one in Wales. These were the only performances in Europe in 1997.

Dylan then returned to the United States to perform more concerts. The tour started in Starkville, Mississippi and came to an end in San Jose, California. Shortly after completing this tour, Dylan set out on tour again, this time performing in small club venues.

== Shows ==
Date	City	Country	Venue
Asia
February 9, 1997	Tokyo	Japan	Tokyo International Forum
February 10, 1997	Tokyo	Japan	Tokyo International Forum
February 11, 1997	Tokyo	Japan	Tokyo International Forum
February 13, 1997	Kurashiki	Japan	Kurashiki Shimin Hakata
February 14, 1997	Fukuoka	Japan	Fukuoka Sunpalace
February 16, 1997	Nagoya	Japan	Nagoya Congress Center
February 17, 1997	Osaka	Japan	Festival Hall
February 18, 1997	Osaka	Japan	Festival Hall
February 20, 1997	Sendai	Japan	Sendai Sun Plaza
February 22, 1997	Akita	Japan	Akita Prefectural Hall
February 24, 1997	Sapporo	Japan	Kōsei Nenkin Kaikan
North America
March 31, 1997	St. John's	Canada	St. Johns Memorial Stadium
April 1, 1997	St. John's	Canada	St. Johns Memorial Stadium
April 5, 1997	Moncton	Canada	Moncton Coliseum
April 6, 1997	Halifax	Canada	Halifax Metro Centre
April 7, 1997	Fredericton	Canada	Aitken Centre
April 8, 1997	Saint John	Canada	Harbour Station
April 9, 1997	Bangor	United States	Bangor Auditorium
April 10, 1997	Portland	United States	Sullivan Gym
April 11, 1997	Durham	United States	Whittemore Center
April 12, 1997	Waltham	United States	Charles A. Dana Center
April 13, 1997	Wayne	United States	Recreation Center
April 15, 1997	Northampton	United States	John M. Greene Hall
April 17, 1997	Providence	United States	Meehan Auditorium
April 18, 1997	Guilderland	United States	Recreation and Convocation Center
April 19, 1997	West Hartford	United States	Sports Center, University of Hartford
April 20, 1997	West Long Branch	United States	William T. Boylan Gymnasium
April 22, 1997	Indiana, PA	United States	Fisher Auditorium, Indiana University of Pennsylvania
April 24, 1997	Utica	United States	Stanley Performing Arts Center
April 25, 1997	St. Bonaventure	United States	Reilly Center
April 27, 1997	Boalsburg	United States	Tussey Mountain Amphitheatre
April 28, 1997	Wheeling	United States	Capitol Music Hall
April 29, 1997	Muncie	United States	Emens Auditorium
May 1, 1997	Evansville	United States	Vanderburgh Auditorium
May 2, 1997^{[A]}	Memphis	United States	Tom Lee Park
May 3, 1997	Huntsville	United States	Von Braun Center
August 3, 1997	Lincoln	United States	Loon Mountain
August 4, 1997	Lenox	United States	Music Shed
August 5, 1997	Montreal	Canada	Du Maurier Stadium
August 7, 1997	Toronto	Canada	Molson Amphitheatre
August 8, 1997	Corfu	United States	Darien Lake Performing Arts Center
August 9, 1997	Burgettstown	United States	Coca-Cola Star Lake Amphitheatre
August 10, 1997	Clarkston	United States	Pine Knob Music Theatre
August 12, 1997	Scranton	United States	Montage Performing Arts Center
August 13, 1997	Hershey	United States	Star Pavilion
August 15, 1997	Holmdel Township	United States	PNC Bank Arts Center
August 16, 1997	Mansfield	United States	Mansfield Center for the Performing Arts
August 17, 1997	Wantagh	United States	Jones Beach Amphitheater
August 18, 1997	Wallingford	United States	Oakdale Theatre
August 20, 1997	Philadelphia	United States	Mann Center for the Performing Arts
August 22, 1997	Virginia Beach	United States	GTE Amphitheater
August 23, 1997	Vienna	United States	Wolf Trap Park for the Performing Arts
August 24, 1997	Vienna	United States	Wolf Trap Park for the Performing Arts
August 26, 1997	Cuyahoga Falls	United States	Blossom Music Center
August 27, 1997	Noblesville	United States	Deer Creek Music Center
August 28, 1997	Tinley Park	United States	World Amphitheater
August 29, 1997	Saint Paul	United States	Midway Stadium
August 31, 1997^{[B]}	Kansas City	United States	Liberty Memorial Park
Europe
October 1, 1997	Bournemouth	England	Bournemouth International Centre
October 2, 1997	Bournemouth	England	Bournemouth International Centre
October 3, 1997	Cardiff	Wales	Cardiff International Arena
October 5, 1997	London	England	Wembley Arena
North America
October 24, 1997	Starkville	United States	Humphrey Coliseum
October 25, 1997	Jackson	United States	Thalía Mara Hall
October 26, 1997	Mobile	United States	Mobile Civic Center
October 28, 1997	Athens	United States	Classic Center
October 29, 1997	Athens	United States	Classic Center
October 30, 1997	Columbus	United States	Columbus Civic Center
October 31, 1997	Tuscaloosa	United States	Coleman Coliseum
November 1, 1997	Asheville	United States	Thomas Wolfe Auditorium
November 2, 1997	Columbia	United States	Township Auditorium
November 4, 1997	Knoxville	United States	James White Civic Coliseum
November 5, 1997	Huntington	United States	Huntington Civic Center
November 7, 1997	Columbus	United States	Columbus Veterans Memorial Auditorium
November 8, 1997	Dayton	United States	Hara Arena
November 9, 1997	Bloomington	United States	Indiana University Auditorium
November 11, 1997	Lisle	United States	Rice Athletic Center
November 12, 1997	Milwaukee	United States	Eagles Ballroom
December 1, 1997	Atlanta	United States	Roxy Theatre
December 2, 1997	Atlanta	United States	Roxy Theatre
December 4, 1997	Washington, D.C.	United States	9:30 Club
December 5, 1997	Washington, D.C.	United States	9:30 Club
December 8, 1997	New York City	United States	Irving Plaza
December 9, 1997	Boston	United States	Avalon Ballroom
December 10, 1997	Philadelphia	United States	Trocadero Theatre
December 11, 1997	Philadelphia	United States	Trocadero Theatre
December 13, 1997	Chicago	United States	Metro Chicago
December 14, 1997	Chicago	United States	Metro Chicago
December 16, 1997	Los Angeles	United States	El Rey Theatre
December 17, 1997	Los Angeles	United States	El Rey Theatre
December 18, 1997	Los Angeles	United States	El Rey Theatre
December 19, 1997	Los Angeles	United States	El Rey Theatre
December 20, 1997	Los Angeles	United States	El Rey Theatre

Festivals and other miscellaneous performances
^{A} This concert was a part of "Memphis in May".
^{B} This concert was a part of "Spirit Fest".

Cancellations and rescheduled shows

June 1, 1997	Cork, Ireland	Millstreet Co.	The Great Irish Famine Event	Cancelled
June 3, 1997	Glasgow, Scotland	SE&CC Hall 4	Concert	Cancelled
June 4, 1997	Newcastle, England	Newcastle Arena	Concert	Cancelled
June 6, 1997	Manchester, England	NYNEX Arena	Concert	Cancelled
June 7, 1997	London, England	Finsbury Park	Fleadh '97	Cancelled
June 8, 1997	Birmingham, England	NEC LG Arena	Concert	Cancelled
June 9, 1997	Sheffield, England	Sheffield Arena	Concert	Cancelled
June 13, 1997	Locarno, Switzerland	Piazza Grande	Rock Gegen Hass Festival	Cancelled
June 14, 1997	Sion, Switzerland	Stade Tourbillon	Rock Gegen Hass Festival	Cancelled
June 15, 1997	Zurich, Switzerland	Platzspitz	Rock Gegen Hass Festival	Cancelled
June 18, 1997	Burgenland, Austria	Wiesen	Rock Legends In Wiesen	Cancelled
