= Never Ending Tour =

Popular name for Bob Dylan's touring schedule

- World tour by Bob Dylan
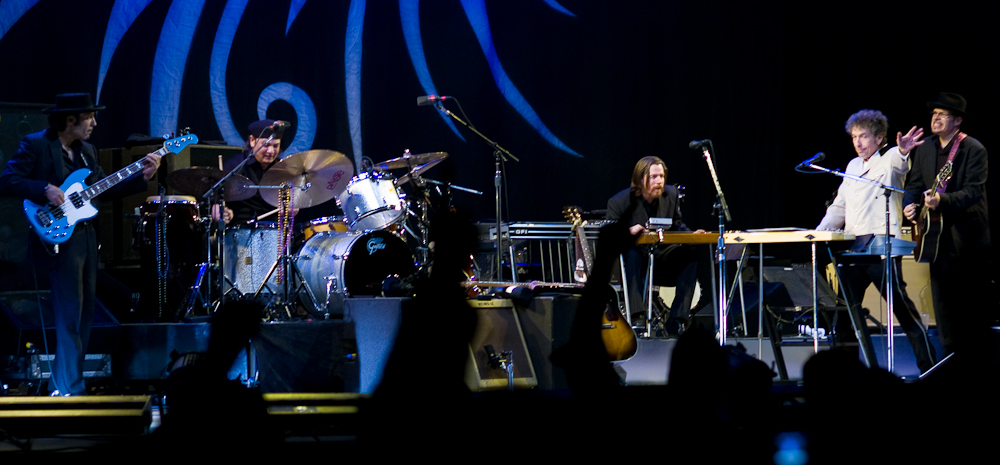
- Bob Dylan and his Band, Spectrum, Oslo, Norway, March 30, 2007
- Location: North America; Europe; South America; Australia; Asia; Central America
- Start date: June 7, 1988
- End date: Ongoing
- Legs: 135
- No. of shows: Over 3,700

The Never Ending Tour is the popular name for Bob Dylan's ongoing touring schedule which began on June 7, 1988. The tour has amassed a huge fan base with some fans traveling from around the world to attend as many Dylan shows as possible. Dylan himself has been dismissive of the Never Ending Tour tag, but his touring schedule has continued to be referred to as the "Never Ending Tour" by most media outlets.

According to Swedish researcher Olof Björner, Dylan played show number 2,000 of the Never Ending Tour on October 16, 2007, in Dayton, Ohio. He played show number 3,000 on April 19, 2019, in Innsbruck, Austria. Dylan has attributed much of the versatility of his live shows to the talent of his backing band, with whom he recorded each of his 21st-century studio albums: Love and Theft (2001); Modern Times (2006); Together Through Life (2009); Christmas in the Heart (2009); Tempest (2012); Shadows in the Night (2015); Fallen Angels (2016); Triplicate (2017); and Rough and Rowdy Ways (2020).

Following the 2019 touring year, performances were cancelled during 2020 in Japan and the US due to the COVID-19 pandemic. On September 27, 2021, Dylan announced a new tour called the Rough and Rowdy Ways World Wide Tour, spanning 2021–2026, with the tour starting in November 2021. This tour has been referred to by the media as an extension of his ongoing Never Ending Tour.

== Origin ==
The tour's name was cemented when journalist Adrian Deevoy published his interview with Dylan in Q Magazine no. 39, December 1989. Critic Michael Gray listened to Deevoy's interview tape and points out in The Bob Dylan Encyclopedia that Deevoy's article put the phrase into Dylan's mouth, but it actually came from Deevoy:

Deevoy: Tell me about this live thing. You've gone straight into this tour again—one tour virtually straight into the next one.
Dylan: Oh, it's all the same tour.
Devoy: It's the Never Ending Tour?
Dylan (unenthusiastically): Yeah, yeah.

Dylan himself has been dismissive of the Never Ending Tour tag. He writes in the sleeve notes to his album World Gone Wrong (1993):

Don't be bewildered by the Never Ending Tour chatter. There was a Never Ending Tour but it ended in 1991 with the departure of guitarist G. E. Smith. That one's long gone but there have been many others since then: "The Money Never Runs Out Tour" (Fall of 1991) "Southern Sympathizer Tour" (Early 1992) "Why Do You Look At Me So Strangely Tour" (European Tour 1992) "The One Sad Cry Of Pity Tour" (Australia & West Coast American Tour 1992) "Outburst Of Consciousness Tour" (1992) "Don't Let Your Deal Go Down Tour" (1993) and others, too many to mention each with their own character & design.

In a 2009 interview with Rolling Stone magazine, Dylan questioned the validity of the term Never Ending Tour:

Critics should know there is no such thing as forever. Does anybody call Henry Ford a Never Ending Car Builder? Anybody ever say that Duke Ellington was on a Never Ending Bandstand Tour? These days, people are lucky to have a job. Any job. So critics might be uncomfortable with my working so much. Anybody with a trade can work as long as they want. A carpenter, an electrician. They don't necessarily need to retire.

The tour was briefly interrupted in the spring of 1997 when Dylan was forced to cancel dates after suffering a serious medical issue in May. Columbia Records announced that he was being hospitalized for the potentially fatal chest infection histoplasmosis, but Dylan resumed touring that fall.

== Books, live recordings, and broadcasts ==
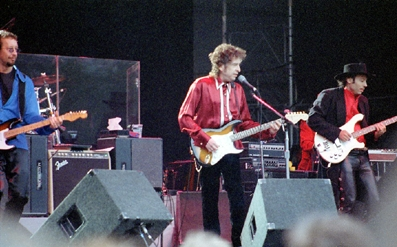
(From left to right) John "J.J." Jackson, Dylan, and Tony Garnier performing in Stockholm, Sweden, July 27, 1996

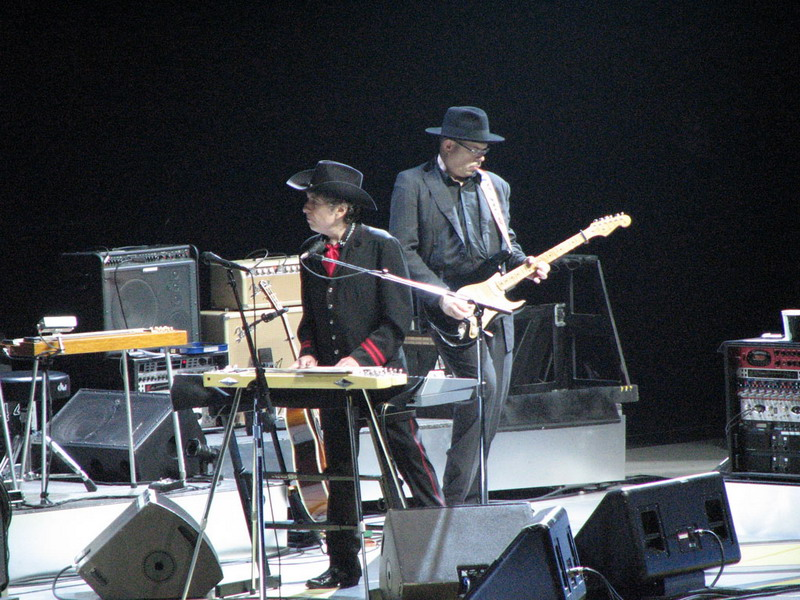
Bob Dylan performing at the Scotiabank Arena, Toronto, November 7, 2006

Andrew Muir published Razor's Edge: Bob Dylan and the Never Ending Tour in September 2001. The book chronicles the first fifteen years of Dylan's Never Ending Tour from the point of view of a committed fan, analyzing how Dylan varies his interpretations of his songs, and exploring his possible motivations. In July 2013, Muir updated Razor's Edge when he published One More Night: Bob Dylan's Never Ending Tour: this book covers Dylan's touring activities from 1988 to 2011.

The only complete live album of material recorded with the Never Ending Tour band is MTV Unplugged, recorded in 1994 and released in 1995.

Dylan's 2008 album The Bootleg Series Vol. 8: Tell Tale Signs: Rare and Unreleased 1989–2006 included five live performances from the Never Ending Tour recorded between 1992 and 2004. In 2009, former Never Ending Tour drummer Winston Watson released the DVD Bob Dylan Never Ending Tour Diaries: Drummer Winston Watson's Incredible Journey documenting his touring with Dylan between 1992 and 1996.

The Deluxe Edition of Dylan's 2023 album The Bootleg Series Vol. 17: Fragments – Time Out of Mind Sessions (1996–1997) included an entire disc, 12 tracks in total, devoted to live versions of songs from the Time Out of Mind sessions that had been performed between 1997 and 2001.

== Band ==
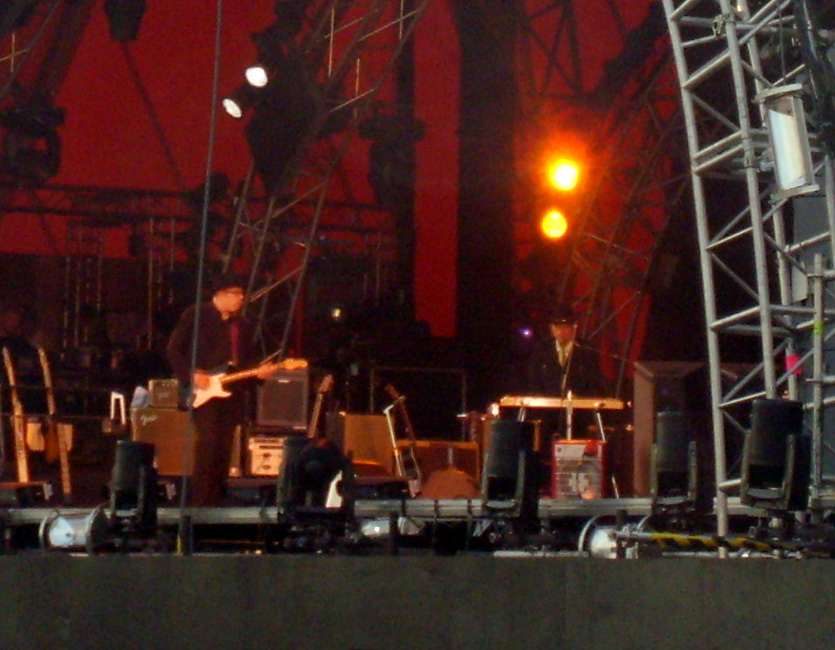
(From left to right) Stu Kimball and Bob Dylan at the Roskilde Festival, 2006

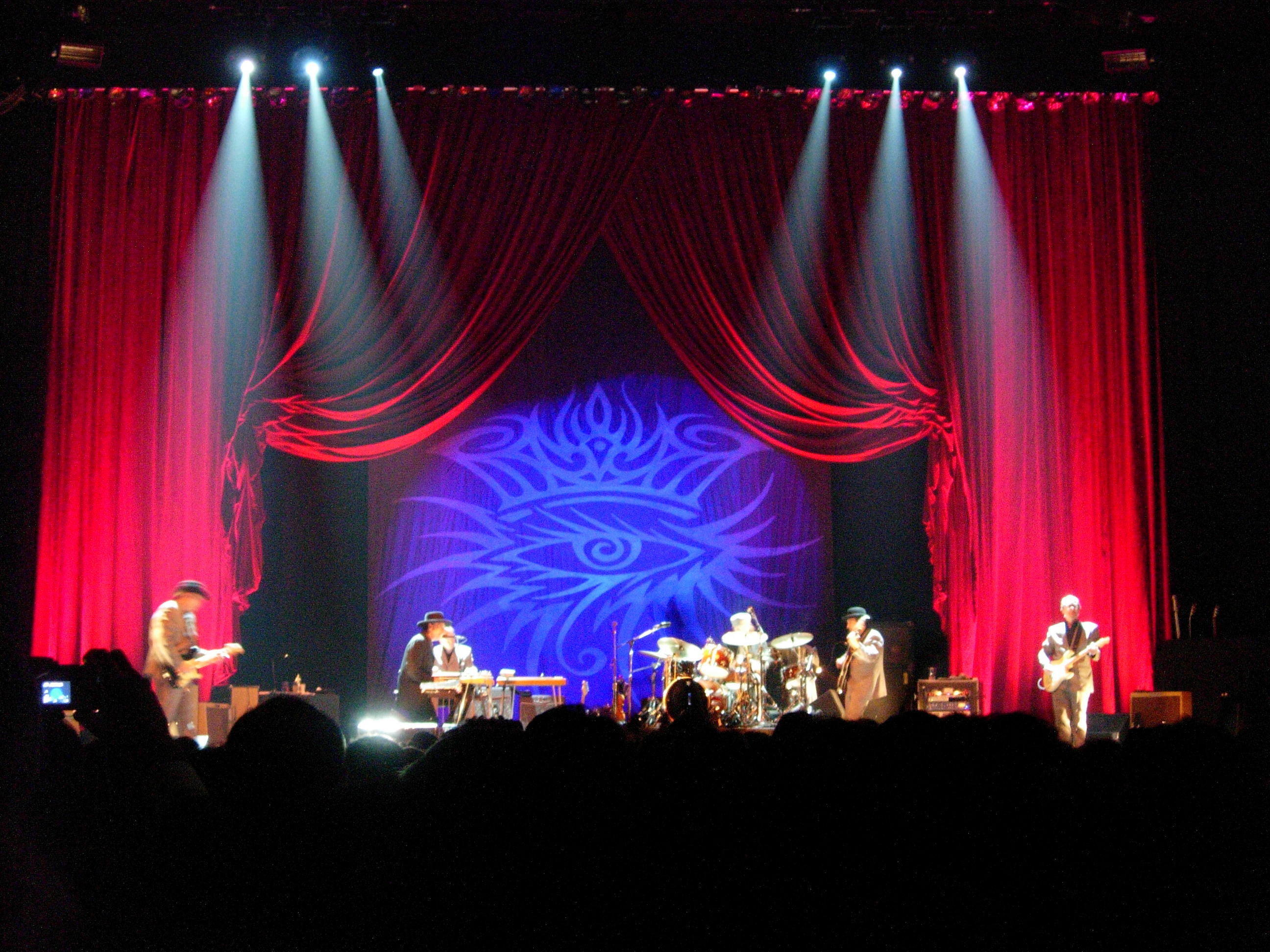
(From left to right) Stu Kimball, Bob Dylan, Donnie Herron, George Recile, Tony Garnier and Denny Freeman performing in Bologna, Italy, November 10, 2005

For a two and a half year period, between 2003 and 2006, Dylan ceased playing guitar, and stuck solely to the keyboard during concerts. Various rumors circulated as to why Dylan gave up guitar during this period, none very reliable. According to David Gates, a Newsweek reporter who interviewed Dylan in 2004, "basically it has to do with his guitar not giving him quite the fullness of sound he was wanting at the bottom. He's thought of hiring a keyboard player so he doesn't have to do it himself, but hasn't been able to figure out who. Most keyboard players, he says, like to be soloists, and he wants a very basic sound". Dylan's touring band typically features two guitarists along with a multi-instrumentalist who plays pedal & lap steel, mandolin, banjo, violin and viola. From 2002 to 2005, Dylan's keyboard had a piano sound. In 2006, this was changed to an organ sound. At the start of his Spring 2007 tour in Europe, Dylan once again began playing guitar. The last time Dylan played an acoustic guitar live was at the White House's Celebration of Music from the Civil Rights concert in 2010. As of the most recent leg of the Never Ending Tour, in Summer 2026, he mostly played an electric keyboard but would also occasionally play electric guitar.

The most recent leg of the Never Ending Tour, in the Fall of 2026, consisted of the following members:

- Bob Dylan – vocals, piano, harmonica, guitar
- Tony Garnier – bass guitar
- Julian Lage – electric guitar
- Joel Paterson – electric guitar
- Anton Fig – drums

During a 2006 interview with Rolling Stone magazine, Dylan spoke about his band at that time:

This is the best band I've ever been in, I've ever had, man for man. When you play with guys a hundred times a year, you know what you can and can't do, what they're good at, whether you want 'em there. It takes a long time to find a band of individual players. Most bands are gangs. Whether it's a metal group or pop rock, whatever, you get that gang mentality. But for those of us who went back further, gangs were the mob. The gang was not what anybody aspired to. On this record [Modern Times] I didn't have anybody to teach. I got guys now in my band, they can whip up anything, they surprise even me.

Other notable members include Stu Kimball (guitar 2004–2018), Denny Freeman (guitar, slide guitar 2005–2009), Larry Campbell (guitar, slide guitar, pedal steel, banjo, cittern, mandolin and violin 1997–2004), George Receli (drums 2002–2019), Donnie Herron (pedal steel guitar, violin, banjo, mandolin 2005–2024), Freddy Koella (guitar 2003–2004), David Kemper (drums 1996–2001), Bucky Baxter (pedal steel 1992–1999), John "J.J." Jackson (guitar 1991–1997) and G. E. Smith (guitar 1988–1990). In 2003–2004, Tommy Morrongiello, a technician on the tour, would frequently play guitar with Dylan & his Band. Charlie Sexton, who played the guitar from 1999 until 2002, returned as the lead guitarist in Dylan's band for the fall 2009 tour, replacing Denny Freeman. Sexton was in turn replaced by Duke Robillard for the first half of 2013, before returning on July 3, 2013. Sexton was replaced for seven concerts by Colin Linden before returning once again on July 26, 2013.

Bob Britt, guitar player for Dylan since 2019, left the tour in late-June 2026 when he posted on social media, “Sayonara Bobby.” His exit followed that of guitarist Doug Lancio, who had been with Dylan since 2021, which was noted by fans at a show in Santa Barbara on June 17, 2026. Joel Paterson was brought in at the end of June 2026 to replace the guitarists, followed by virtuoso Julian Lage. On July 10, 2026, Memphis-based guitarist and vocalist Jad Tariq joined the band at the PNC Pavilion in Cincinnati, replacing Lage (who developed touring conflicts).

Over the years, many artists have been special guests at shows, playing songs with Dylan and his band. Artists include George Harrison, Ringo Starr, Phil Lesh, Jack White, Paul Simon, Ronnie Wood, Bruce Springsteen, Bono, Norah Jones, Willie Nelson, John Mellencamp, Tom Petty, Neil Young, Jimmie Vaughan, Carl Perkins, Elvis Costello, Amos Lee, Patti Smith, Van Morrison, Joni Mitchell, Warren Haynes, Al Kooper, Jorma Kaukonen, Paul James, Kenny Wayne Shepherd, Dave Stewart, Chrissie Hynde, Nils Lofgren, Dave Matthews, Susan Tedeschi, Billy Strings, Dave Alvin, Chuck Loeb, Dickey Betts, Bob Weir, Ian Moore, Roger McGuinn, Cesar Diaz, Boyd Tinsley, LeRoi Moore, Doug Sahm, Aimee Mann, Liz Souissi, Ray Benson, Leon Russell, Lukas Nelson, Carlos Santana and Mark Knopfler.

== Tours ==
1988–2019

- 1988
- 1989
- 1990
- 1991
- 1992
- 1993
- 1994
- 1995
- 1996
- 1997
- 1998
- 1999
- 2000
- 2001
- 2002
- 2003
- 2004
- 2005
- 2006
- 2007
- 2008
- 2009
- 2010
- 2011
- 2012
- 2013
- 2014
- 2015
- 2016
- 2017
- 2018
- 2019

2021–present

- Rough and Rowdy Ways World Wide Tour (2021–2026)
- 2026

=== Canceled 2020 shows ===
Performances in 2020 were canceled due to the COVID-19 pandemic.

Canceled 2020 shows
Date	City	Country	Venue	Support act(s)
Asia
April 1, 2020	Tokyo	Japan	Zepp DiverCity	—N/a
April 2, 2020	Tokyo	Japan	Zepp DiverCity	—N/a
April 4, 2020	Tokyo	Japan	Zepp DiverCity	—N/a
April 5, 2020	Tokyo	Japan	Zepp DiverCity	—N/a
April 6, 2020	Tokyo	Japan	Zepp DiverCity	—N/a
April 8, 2020	Osaka	Japan	Zepp Namba	—N/a
April 9, 2020	Osaka	Japan	Zepp Namba	—N/a
April 10, 2020	Osaka	Japan	Zepp Namba	—N/a
April 14, 2020	Tokyo	Japan	Zepp Tokyo	—N/a
April 15, 2020	Tokyo	Japan	Zepp Tokyo	—N/a
April 17, 2020	Tokyo	Japan	Zepp DiverCity	—N/a
April 19, 2020	Tokyo	Japan	Zepp DiverCity	—N/a
April 20, 2020	Tokyo	Japan	Zepp DiverCity	—N/a
April 21, 2020	Tokyo	Japan	Zepp DiverCity	—N/a
April 24, 2020	Tokyo	Japan	NHK Hall	—N/a
North America
June 4, 2020	Bend	United States	Les Schwab Amphitheatre	Nathaniel Rateliff & the Night Sweats, The Hot Club of Cowtown
June 6, 2020	Ridgefield	United States	Sunlight Supply Amphitheater	Nathaniel Rateliff & the Night Sweats, The Hot Club of Cowtown
June 7, 2020	Auburn	United States	White River Amphitheatre	Nathaniel Rateliff & the Night Sweats, The Hot Club of Cowtown
June 9, 2020	Eugene	United States	Matthew Knight Arena	Nathaniel Rateliff & the Night Sweats, The Hot Club of Cowtown
June 12, 2020	Stateline	United States	Harveys Outdoor Amphitheatre	Nathaniel Rateliff & the Night Sweats, The Hot Club of Cowtown
June 13, 2020	Berkeley	United States	Hearst Greek Theatre	Nathaniel Rateliff & the Night Sweats, The Hot Club of Cowtown
June 14, 2020	Berkeley	United States	Hearst Greek Theatre	Nathaniel Rateliff & the Night Sweats, The Hot Club of Cowtown
June 17, 2020	San Diego	United States	Pechanga Arena	Nathaniel Rateliff & the Night Sweats, The Hot Club of Cowtown
June 18, 2020	Los Angeles	United States	Hollywood Bowl	Nathaniel Rateliff & the Night Sweats, The Hot Club of Cowtown
June 20, 2020	Paradise	United States	Mandalay Bay Events Center	Nathaniel Rateliff & the Night Sweats, The Hot Club of Cowtown
June 21, 2020	Glendale	United States	Gila River Arena	Nathaniel Rateliff & the Night Sweats, The Hot Club of Cowtown
June 23, 2020	Albuquerque	United States	Tingley Coliseum	Nathaniel Rateliff & the Night Sweats, The Hot Club of Cowtown
June 24, 2020	Amarillo	United States	Amarillo Civic Center	Nathaniel Rateliff & the Night Sweats, The Hot Club of Cowtown
June 26, 2020	Irving	United States	The Pavilion @ Toyota Music Factory	Nathaniel Rateliff & the Night Sweats, The Hot Club of Cowtown
June 27, 2020	North Little Rock	United States	Simmons Bank Arena	Nathaniel Rateliff & the Night Sweats, The Hot Club of Cowtown
June 28, 2020	Southaven	United States	BankPlus Amphitheater	Nathaniel Rateliff & the Night Sweats, The Hot Club of Cowtown
June 30, 2020	Southaven	United States	Southaven Amphitheatre	Nathaniel Rateliff & the Night Sweats, The Hot Club of Cowtown
July 2, 2020	Nashville	United States	Bridgestone Arena	Nathaniel Rateliff & the Night Sweats, The Hot Club of Cowtown
July 3, 2020	Alpharetta	United States	Ameris Bank Amphitheatre	Nathaniel Rateliff & the Night Sweats, The Hot Club of Cowtown
July 5, 2020	Virginia Beach	United States	Veterans United Home Loans Amphitheater	Nathaniel Rateliff & the Night Sweats, The Hot Club of Cowtown
July 7, 2020	Wilkes-Barre	United States	Mohegan Sun Arena at Casey Plaza	Nathaniel Rateliff & the Night Sweats, The Hot Club of Cowtown
July 8, 2020	Queens	United States	Forest Hills Stadium	Nathaniel Rateliff & the Night Sweats, The Hot Club of Cowtown
July 9, 2020	Saratoga Springs	United States	Saratoga Performing Arts Center	Nathaniel Rateliff & the Night Sweats, The Hot Club of Cowtown
July 11, 2020	Essex Junction	United States	The Champlain Valley Expo	Nathaniel Rateliff & the Night Sweats, The Hot Club of Cowtown
July 12, 2020	Bethel	United States	Bethel Woods Center for the Arts	Nathaniel Rateliff & the Night Sweats, The Hot Club of Cowtown
July 14, 2020	Rochester	United States	Blue Cross Arena	Nathaniel Rateliff & the Night Sweats, The Hot Club of Cowtown
