= Never Ending Tour 1996 =

1996 concert tour by Bob Dylan

- Tour by Bob Dylan
- Poster to the concert in Kalamazoo, Michigan
- Start date: April 13, 1996
- End date: November 23, 1996
- Legs: 4
- No. of shows: 56 in North America; 28 in Europe; 84 in Total

Bob Dylan concert chronology
- Never Ending Tour 1995 (1995); Never Ending Tour 1996 (1996); Never Ending Tour 1997 (1997)

The Never Ending Tour is the popular name for Bob Dylan's endless touring schedule since June 7, 1988.

== Background ==
The Never Ending Tour 1996 started on April 16 in Madison, New Jersey. The concerts mainly took place in the North-Eastern states of America, as well as four concerts in eastern Canada.

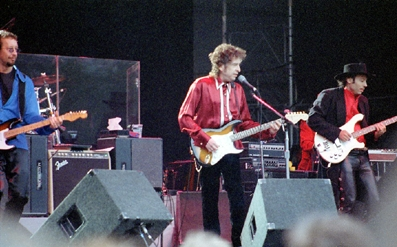
Dylan performing in Sweden during the tour

Dylan later travelled to Europe to perform a twenty-eight date tour of eleven countries and twenty-five cities. Dylan also performed at several festivals, including ‘MasterCard Masters of Music Concert for The Prince's Trust’ as well as the Pori Jazz Festival.

Shortly after finishing the European tour Dylan performed two special shows at the House of Blues in Atlanta, Georgia. Dylan later picked up the tour on October 17 in Los Angeles. The tour came to a close a month and a half later in Akron, Ohio.

There were originally plans to tour smaller club venues towards to the end of December, but these plans were shelved until the following year.

== Shows ==
Date	City	Country	Venue
North America
April 13, 1996	Madison	United States	Simon Forum and Athletic Center
April 14, 1996	New Haven	United States	Palace Performing Arts Center
April 16, 1996	Springfield	United States	Symphony Hall
April 17, 1996	Burlington	United States	Patrick Gym
April 18, 1996	Providence	United States	The Strand
April 19, 1996	Portland	United States	State Theatre
April 20, 1996	Portland	United States	State Theatre
April 21, 1996	Portland	United States	State Theatre
April 22, 1996	Orono	United States	Hutchins Concert Hall
April 23, 1996	Orono	United States	Hutchins Concert Hall
April 26, 1996	Montreal	Canada	Verdun Auditorium
April 27, 1996	Toronto	Canada	The Concert Hall
April 28, 1996	Toronto	Canada	The Concert Hall
April 30, 1996	Syracuse	United States	Landmark Theater
May 1, 1996	Poughkeepsie	United States	Mid-Hudson Civic Center
May 3, 1996	Lewisburg	United States	University Fieldhouse
May 4, 1996	Richmond	United States	Richmond International Raceway
May 7, 1996	Louisville	United States	The Louisville Palace
May 8, 1996	Columbus	United States	Palace Theatre
May 10, 1996	Erie	United States	Erie Civic Center
May 11, 1996	Buffalo	United States	Houston Gym
May 11, 1996	London	Canada	Alumni Hall
May 14, 1996	Ann Arbor	United States	Michigan Theater
May 16, 1996	Clarkston	United States	Pine Knob Music Theatre
May 17, 1996	Cleveland	United States	Nautica Stage
May 18, 1996	Burgettstown	United States	Coca-Cola Star Lake Amphitheater
Europe
June 15, 1996^{[B]}	Aarhus	Denmark	Tangkrogen
June 17, 1996	Berlin	Germany	Tempodrom
June 19, 1996	Frankfurt	Germany	Alte Oper
June 20, 1996	Utrecht	Netherlands	Muziekcentrum Vredenburg
June 21, 1996	Utrecht	Netherlands	Muziekcentrum Vredenburg
June 22, 1996	Brussels	Belgium	Forest National
June 24, 1996	Kirchberg	Luxembourg	d'Coque
June 26, 1996	Liverpool	England	Liverpool Empire Theatre
June 27, 1996	Liverpool	England	Liverpool Empire Theatre
June 29, 1996^{[C]}	London	England	Hyde Park
July 1, 1996	Münster	Germany	Halle Münsterland
July 2, 1996	Mannheim	Germany	Mannheimer Rosengarten
July 3, 1996^{[D]}	Konstanz	Germany	Bodenseestadion
July 5, 1996	Ferrara	Italy	Piazza del Municipio
July 7, 1996^{[E]}	Pistoia	Italy	Piazza del Duomo
July 8, 1996	Codroipo	Italy	Villa Manin
July 9, 1996	Salzburg	Austria	Sporthalle Alpenstrasse
July 10, 1996	Tambach	Germany	Schloss Tambach
July 12, 1996	Magdeburg	Germany	Stadthalle Magdeburg
July 13, 1996	Hamburg	Germany	Trabrennbahn Bahrenfeld
July 14, 1996	Cottbus	Germany	Stadthalle Cottbus
July 18, 1996	Oslo	Norway	Oslo Spektrum
July 19, 1996^{[F]}	Molde	Norway	Romsdalsmuseet
July 21, 1996^{[G]}	Pori	Finland	Kirjurinluoto Arena
July 23, 1996	Copenhagen	Denmark	Den Grå Hal
July 24, 1996	Copenhagen	Denmark	Den Grå Hal
July 25, 1996	Malmö	Sweden	Slottsmollan
July 27, 1996^{[H]}	Stockholm	Sweden	Lida Friluftsgård
North America
August 3, 1996	Atlanta	United States	House of Blues
August 4, 1996	Atlanta	United States	House of Blues
October 17, 1996	San Luis Obispo	United States	California Polytechnic State University Rec Center
October 19, 1996	Primm	United States	Star of the Desert Arena
October 20, 1996	Mesa	United States	Mesa Amphitheatre
October 21, 1996	Tucson	United States	Tucson Centennial Hall
October 23, 1996	Albuquerque	United States	Kiva Auditorium
October 25, 1996	Dallas	United States	Bronco Bowl
October 26, 1996	Austin	United States	Austin Music Hall
October 27, 1996	Austin	United States	Austin Music Hall
October 29, 1996	Oklahoma City	United States	Civic Center Music Hall
October 30, 1996	Shreveport	United States	Shreveport Municipal Memorial Auditorium
November 1, 1996	Tupelo	United States	Tupelo Coliseum
November 2, 1996	Birmingham	United States	Alabama Theatre
November 3, 1996	Chattanooga	United States	Soldiers and Sailors Memorial Auditorium
November 4, 1996	Spartanburg	United States	Spartanburg Memorial Auditorium
November 6, 1996	Charleston	United States	Charleston Municipal Auditorium
November 7, 1996	Dayton	United States	Dayton Memorial Hall
November 9, 1996	Milwaukee	United States	Eagles Ballroom
November 10, 1996	Mankato	United States	Civic Center Arena
November 12, 1996	Dubuque	United States	Five Flags Center
November 13, 1996	Madison	United States	Memorial Coliseum
November 15, 1996	Ames	United States	Stephens Auditorium
November 16, 1996	Davenport	United States	Adler Theater
November 17, 1996	Bloomington	United States	Indiana University Auditorium
November 19, 1996	Kalamazoo	United States	Wings Stadium
November 20, 1996	East Lansing	United States	MSU Auditorium
November 21, 1996	Ann Arbor	United States	Hill Auditorium
November 22, 1996	South Bend	United States	Morris Performing Arts Center
November 23, 1996	Akron	United States	E. J. Thomas Hall

Festivals and other miscellaneous performances
^{A} This concert was a part of "Arhus Festival".
^{B} This concert was a part of "MasterCard Masters of Music Concert for The Prince's Trust".
^{C} This concert was a part of "Zeltfestival".
^{D} This concert was a part of "Pistoia Blues Festival".
^{E} This concert was a part of "Molde Jazz Festival".
^{F} This concert was a part of "Pori Jazz Festival".
^{G} This concert was a part of "Lollipop Festival".

=== Cancelled shows ===
List of concerts, showing date, city, country and venues.
Date	City	Country	Venue	Reason
April 25, 1996	Montreal	Canada	—N/a	Merged with Verdun Auditorium show.
June 29, 1996	Lyon	France	—N/a	In order to appear at Hyde Park event.
October 19, 1996	Las Vegas	United States	Star of the Desert Arena	Cancelled
