= Never Ending Tour 1993 =

1993 concert tour by Bob Dylan

- Tour by Bob Dylan
- Advertisement to the concert in Radford, USA
- Start date: February 5, 1993
- End date: October 9, 1993
- Legs: 4
- No. of shows: 76

Bob Dylan concert chronology
- Never Ending Tour 1992 (1992); Never Ending Tour 1993 (1993); Never Ending Tour 1994 (1994)

The Never Ending Tour is the popular name for Bob Dylan's endless touring schedule since June 7, 1988.

== Background ==
The Never Ending Tour 1993 started on February 5 in Dublin, Ireland. On February 7 Dylan started a six show run at Hammersmith Apollo in London, England. The tour came to an end on February 25 in Northern Ireland at the Maysfield Leisure Centre.

Dylan then travelled to North America to perform a nine date tour of the United States. The tour culminated with a performance at the New Orleans Jazz & Heritage Festival.

On June 12 Dylan returned to Europe with a performance at Fleadh Festival in London. He then travelled to Israel where he performed three concerts before moving on to Athens, Greece with two performances at the Mount Lycabettus open–air theatre. Dylan then went on to perform three concerts in Italy, two concerts in France, six concerts in Spain, one in Ireland, two in Portugal and the tour came to an end on July 17 in Bern, Switzerland.

Dylan returned to North America in the late summer to perform a thirty–one date tour the United States and Canada with Santana. The tour covered twenty–nine cities in fifteen states, and two Canadian provinces. On November 16 and 17, Dylan performed four unplugged shows at The Supper Club in New York, playing two concerts on each day, one in the afternoon and the other in the evening. The tour came to an end after eighty shows, the second shortest tour of the Never Ending Tour.

== Tour dates ==
List of concerts, showing date, city, country, venues and box office data.
Date	City	Country	Venue	Attendance	Box Office
Europe
February 5, 1993	Dublin	Ireland	Point Theatre	—N/a	—N/a
February 7, 1993	London	England	Labatt's Apollo	—N/a	—N/a
February 8, 1993	London	England	Labatt's Apollo	—N/a	—N/a
February 9, 1993	London	England	Labatt's Apollo	—N/a	—N/a
February 11, 1993	London	England	Labatt's Apollo	—N/a	—N/a
February 12, 1993	London	England	Labatt's Apollo	—N/a	—N/a
February 13, 1993	London	England	Labatt's Apollo	—N/a	—N/a
February 15, 1993	Utrecht	Netherlands	Muziekcentrum Vredenburg	—N/a	—N/a
February 16, 1993	Utrecht	Netherlands	Muziekcentrum Vredenburg	—N/a	—N/a
February 17, 1993	Eindhoven	Netherlands	Muziekgebouw Frits Philips	—N/a	—N/a
February 18, 1993	Hanover	Germany	Music Hall	—N/a	—N/a
February 20, 1993	Wiesbaden	Germany	Rhein-Main-Hallen	—N/a	—N/a
February 21, 1993	Pétange	Luxembourg	Centre Sportif	—N/a	—N/a
February 23, 1993	Paris	France	Zénith de Paris	—N/a	—N/a
February 25, 1993	Belfast	Northern Ireland	Maysfield Leisure Centre	—N/a	—N/a
North America
April 12, 1993	Louisville	United States	Robert S. Whitney Hall	—N/a	—N/a
April 13, 1993	Nashville	United States	Andrew Jackson Hall	—N/a	—N/a
April 14, 1993	Nashville	United States	Andrew Jackson Hall	—N/a	—N/a
April 16, 1993	Radford	United States	Dedmon Center	—N/a	—N/a
April 17, 1993	Knoxville	United States	Knoxville Civic Coliseum	—N/a	—N/a
April 18, 1993	Asheville	United States	Thomas Wolfe Auditorium	—N/a	—N/a
April 19, 1993	Huntsville	United States	Huntsville Convention Center	—N/a	—N/a
April 21, 1993	Monroe	United States	Monroe Civic Center Theater	—N/a	—N/a
April 23, 1993 (Note: The April 23, 1993 concert in New Orleans was part of New Orleans Jazz & Heritage Festival.)	New Orleans	United States	Fair Grounds Race Course	—N/a	—N/a
Europe/Middle East
June 12, 1993 (Note: The June 12, 1993 concert in London was part of Fleadh Festival.)	London	England	Finsbury Park	—N/a	—N/a
June 17, 1993	Tel Aviv	Israel	Fredric R. Mann Auditorium	—N/a	—N/a
June 19, 1993	Beersheba	Israel	Amphitheatre Dimoi	—N/a	—N/a
June 20, 1993 (Note: The June 20, 1993 concert in London was part of Harbour Blues Festival.)	Haifa	Israel	Port of Haifa	—N/a	—N/a
June 22, 1993	Athens	Greece	Theatron Lykavitou	—N/a	—N/a
June 23, 1993	Athens	Greece	Theatron Lykavitou	—N/a	—N/a
June 25, 1993	Naples	Italy	Teatro di San Carlo	—N/a	—N/a
June 26, 1993	Pisa	Italy	Campo Sportivo Bellaria	—N/a	—N/a
June 27, 1993	Milan	Italy	Palatrussardi	—N/a	—N/a
June 29, 1993	Marseille	France	Palais des Sports de Marseille	—N/a	—N/a
June 30, 1993	Toulouse	France	Palais des sports André-Brouat	—N/a	—N/a
July 1, 1993	Barcelona	Spain	Poble Espanyol	—N/a	—N/a
July 2, 1993	Vitoria-Gasteiz	Spain	El Pabellón Araba de Vitoria	—N/a	—N/a
July 4, 1993 (Note: The July 4, 1993 concert in Waterford was part of Fleadh Mór.)	Waterford	Ireland	Tramore Racecourse	—N/a	—N/a
July 6, 1993	Huesca	Spain		—N/a	—N/a
July 8, 1993	Gijón	Spain	Plaza de Toros de El Bibio	—N/a	—N/a
July 9, 1993 (Note: The July 9, 1993 concert in A Coruña was part of Xacobe Festival.)	A Coruña	Spain	Estadio Riazor	—N/a	—N/a
July 10, 1993	Porto	Portugal	Coliseu do Porto	—N/a	—N/a
July 12, 1993	Mérida	Spain	Teatro Romano de Mérida	—N/a	—N/a
July 13, 1993	Cascais	Portugal	Pavilhão Guilherme Pinto Basto	—N/a	—N/a
July 17, 1993 (Note: The July 17, 1993 concert in Bern was part of Gurtenfestival.)	Bern	Switzerland	Gurten	—N/a	—N/a
North America (with Santana)
August 20, 1993	Portland	United States	Portland Memorial Coliseum	4,516 / 7,500	$108,384
August 21, 1993	Seattle	United States	Seattle Memorial Stadium	7,188 / 10,000	$201,590
August 22, 1993	Vancouver	Canada	Pacific Coliseum	—N/a	—N/a
August 25, 1993	Greenwood Village	United States	Fiddler's Green Amphitheatre	—N/a	—N/a
August 27, 1993 (Note: The August 27, 1993 concert in Falcon Heights was part of Minnesota State Fair.)	Falcon Heights	United States	Minnesota State Fairgrounds	—N/a	—N/a
August 28, 1993	Milwaukee	United States	Marcus Amphitheater	—N/a	—N/a
August 29, 1993	Tinley Park	United States	World Music Theatre	7,800 / 10,000	$198,097
August 31, 1993	Clarkston	United States	Pine Knob Music Theatre	—N/a	—N/a
September 2, 1993	Toronto	Canada	Exhibition Stadium	—N/a	—N/a
September 3, 1993 (Note: The September 3, 1993 concert in Syracuse was part of Minnesota State Fair.)	Syracuse	United States	New York State Fairgrounds	—N/a	—N/a
September 4, 1993	Saratoga Springs	United States	Saratoga Performing Arts Center	—N/a	—N/a
September 5, 1993	Scranton	United States	Montage Mountain Amphitheater	—N/a	—N/a
September 8, 1993	Vienna	United States	Filene Center	12,513 / 13,972	$313,730
September 9, 1993	Vienna	United States	Filene Center	12,513 / 13,972	$313,730
September 10, 1993	Wantagh	United States	Jones Beach Marine Theater	14,315 / 21,574	$450,923
September 11, 1993	Wantagh	United States	Jones Beach Marine Theater	14,315 / 21,574	$450,923
September 12, 1993	Mansfield	United States	Great Woods Center for the Performing Arts	—N/a	—N/a
September 14, 1993	Holmdel Township	United States	Garden State Arts Center	7,710 / 10,802	$216,828
September 17, 1993	Charlotte	United States	Blockbuster Pavilion	—N/a	—N/a
September 18, 1993	Atlanta	United States	Chastain Park Amphitheater	7,000 / 7,000	$219,249
September 19, 1993	Raleigh	United States	Walnut Creek Amphitheatre	7,510 / 20,000	$104,176
September 21, 1993	Tampa	United States	USF Sun Dome	—N/a	—N/a
September 22, 1993	Miami	United States	James L. Knight Center	—N/a	—N/a
September 23, 1993	West Palm Beach	United States	West Palm Beach Auditorium	—N/a	—N/a
October 1, 1993	Costa Mesa	United States	Pacific Amphitheatre	—N/a	—N/a
October 2, 1993	Los Angeles	United States	Hollywood Bowl	13,967 / 17,291	$501,725
October 3, 1993	San Diego	United States	San Diego Sports Arena	9,892 / 10,652	$230,808
October 5, 1993	San Bernardino	United States	Blockbuster Pavilion	—N/a	—N/a
October 7, 1993	Concord	United States	Concord Pavilion	7,258 / 8,225	$184,669
October 8, 1993	Sacramento	United States	Cal Expo Amphitheatre	3,994 / 7,500	$91,500
October 9, 1993	Mountain View	United States	Shoreline Amphitheatre	13,210 / 20,000	$30,033
