= Never Ending Tour 1998 =

1998 concert tour by Bob Dylan

- Tour by Bob Dylan
- Poster to the concerts in San Jose, USA
- Start date: January 13, 1998
- End date: November 7, 1998
- Legs: 7
- No. of shows: 56 in North America; 6 in South America; 33 in Europe; 15 in Oceania; 110 in Total

Bob Dylan concert chronology
- Never Ending Tour 1997 (1997); Never Ending Tour 1998 (1998); Never Ending Tour 1999 (1999)

The Never Ending Tour is the popular name for Bob Dylan's endless touring schedule since June 7, 1988.

== Background information ==
The Never Ending Tour 1998 started in North America with two performances in New London, Connecticut and five concerts at the Madison Square Theatre. Dylan continued to tour the North-East states until the tour came to a close on February 22 in Fairfax, Virginia.

After finishing the North American winter tour, Dylan performed two concerts in Miami, Florida, before flying to South America to support The Rolling Stones as well as performing several South American concerts without them.

Dylan returned to the United States to perform eight concerts with Joni Mitchell and Van Morrison. Shortly after finishing this tour Dylan travelled to Europe to perform a 33 date concert tour with several major festival appearances, including Rock am Ring and Rock im Park, Norwegian Wood Festival, Roskilde Festival and Glastonbury Festival.

In August Dylan travelled to Australia to perform his first tour there since 1992. The tour started off with a performance at the Mercury Lounge. Dylan performed another ten concerts in Australia before travelling to New Zealand, where he performed four concerts, two of which were in Auckland.

After finishing his Oceania tour Dylan flew from Australia to Hawaii. He also performed a further six concerts in the United States all of which were dual concerts with Van Morrison.

In October Dylan toured North America without support from any other major act. He performed seven concerts in Canada and ten in the United States. The tour came to an end on November 7 in Atlanta, Georgia after one hundred and ten concerts.

== Shows ==
Date	City	Country	Venue	Tickets sold/available	Box office
North America
January 13, 1998	New London	United States	Garde Arts Center	—N/a	—N/a
January 14, 1998	New London	United States	Garde Arts Center	—N/a	—N/a
January 16, 1998	New York City	United States	Madison Square Garden Theater	—N/a	—N/a
January 17, 1998	New York City	United States	Madison Square Garden Theater	—N/a	—N/a
January 18, 1998	New York City	United States	Madison Square Garden Theater	—N/a	—N/a
January 20, 1998	New York City	United States	Madison Square Garden Theater	—N/a	—N/a
January 21, 1998	New York City	United States	Madison Square Garden Theater	—N/a	—N/a
January 23, 1998	Boston	United States	Fleet Center	28,800 / 28,800 (100%)	$1,454,860
January 24, 1998	Boston	United States	Fleet Center	28,800 / 28,800 (100%)	$1,454,860
January 27, 1998	Poughkeepsie	United States	Mid-Hudson Civic Center	—N/a	—N/a
January 28, 1998	Syracuse	United States	Landmark Theatre	—N/a	—N/a
January 30, 1998	Brookville	United States	Tilles Center for the Performing Arts	—N/a	—N/a
January 31, 1998	Atlantic City	United States	Etess Arena	4,764 / 4,764 (100%)	$155,200
February 1, 1998	Newark	United States	Prudential Hall	—N/a	—N/a
February 2, 1998	Springfield	United States	Symphony Hall	2,531 / 2,531 (100%)	$77,645
February 14, 1998	Cleveland	United States	Public Auditorium	4,506 / 7,309 (62%)	$124,348
February 15, 1998	Toledo	United States	John F. Savage Hall	3,352 / 5,500 (61%)	$87,493
February 17, 1998	St. Louis	United States	Fox Theatre	4,252 / 4,278 (99%)	$111,333
February 19, 1998	Cincinnati	United States	Cincinnati Gardens	4,410 / 7,310 (60%)	$124,852
February 20, 1998	Bristol	United States	Viking Hall	—N/a	—N/a
February 22, 1998	Fairfax	United States	Patriot Center	4,360 / 8,500 (51%)	$152,600
March 30, 1998	Miami Beach	United States	Cameo Theater	—N/a	—N/a
March 31, 1998	Miami Beach	United States	Cameo Theater	—N/a	—N/a
South America
April 4, 1998	Buenos Aires	Argentina	River Plate Stadium	—N/a	—N/a
April 5, 1998	Buenos Aires	Argentina	River Plate Stadium	—N/a	—N/a
April 7, 1998	Porto Alegre	Brazil	Bar Opinião	—N/a	—N/a
April 11, 1998	Rio de Janeiro	Brazil	Praça da Apoteose	—N/a	—N/a
April 13, 1998	São Paulo	Brazil	Ibirapuera Sporting Complex	—N/a	—N/a
April 15, 1998	Santiago	Chile	Teatro Monumental	—N/a	—N/a
North America
May 13, 1998	Vancouver	Canada	The Rage	__	__
May 14, 1998	Vancouver	Canada	General Motors Arena	14,879 / 15,823	$810,947
May 16, 1998	George	United States	The Gorge Amphitheatre	—N/a	—N/a
May 17, 1998	George	United States	The Gorge Amphitheatre	—N/a	—N/a
May 19, 1998	San Jose	United States	San Jose Arena	14,185 / 14,185 (100%)	$865,425
May 21, 1998	Los Angeles	United States	Pauley Pavilion	—N/a	—N/a
May 22, 1998	Los Angeles	United States	Pauley Pavilion	—N/a	—N/a
May 23, 1998	Anaheim	United States	Arrowhead Pond Arena	12,329 / 12,329 (100%)	$802,580
Europe
May 30, 1998^{[A]}	Nürburg	Germany	Nürburgring	—N/a	—N/a
May 31, 1998^{[B]}	Nuremberg	Germany	Frankenstadion	—N/a	—N/a
June 2, 1998	Leipzig	Germany	Messehalle Leipzig	—N/a	—N/a
June 3, 1998	Berlin	Germany	Waldbühne	—N/a	—N/a
June 4, 1998	Rostock	Germany	Stadthalle Rostock	—N/a	—N/a
June 6, 1998^{[C]}	Malmö	Sweden	Sibbarps Strand	—N/a	—N/a
June 7, 1998^{[D]}	Oslo	Norway	Frognerbadet	—N/a	—N/a
June 9, 1998	Stockholm	Sweden	Globe Arena	—N/a	—N/a
June 10, 1998	Gothenburg	Sweden	Scandinavium	—N/a	—N/a
June 11, 1998	Copenhagen	Denmark	Forum Copenhagen	—N/a	—N/a
June 12, 1998	Hamburg	Germany	Hamburg Stadtpark	—N/a	—N/a
June 14, 1998	Bremen	Germany	Stadthalle	—N/a	—N/a
June 15, 1998	Rotterdam	Netherlands	Rotterdam Ahoy	—N/a	—N/a
June 16, 1998	Essen	Germany	Grugahalle	—N/a	—N/a
June 17, 1998	Brussels	Belgium	Forest National	—N/a	—N/a
June 19, 1998	Belfast	Northern Ireland	Belfast Botanic Gardens	—N/a	—N/a
June 20, 1998	Newcastle	England	Telewest Arena	—N/a	—N/a
June 21, 1998	Glasgow	Scotland	Scottish Exhibition and Conference Centre	—N/a	—N/a
June 23, 1998	Sheffield	England	Sheffield Arena	—N/a	—N/a
June 24, 1998	Birmingham	England	NEC LG Arena	—N/a	—N/a
June 25, 1998	Manchester	England	NYNEX Arena	—N/a	—N/a
June 26, 1998^{[E]}	Roskilde	Denmark	Roskilde Dyrskueplads	—N/a	—N/a
June 27, 1998	London	England	Wembley Arena	—N/a	—N/a
June 28, 1998^{[F]}	Pilton	England	Worthy Farm	—N/a	—N/a
June 30, 1998	Paris	France	Zénith de Paris	—N/a	—N/a
July 1, 1998	Dijon	France	Palais des Sports de Dijon	—N/a	—N/a
July 3, 1998^{[G]}	Montreux	Switzerland	Stravinsky Hall	—N/a	—N/a
July 4, 1998	Villafranca	Italy	Castello Scaligero	—N/a	—N/a
July 5, 1998	Rome	Italy	Piazza di Spagna	—N/a	—N/a
July 6, 1998	Lucca	Italy	Piazza Napoleone	—N/a	—N/a
July 9, 1998^{[H]}	Turin	Italy	Collegno Torino	—N/a	—N/a
July 11, 1998^{[I]}	Escalante	Spain	La Guingueta d'Àneu	—N/a	—N/a
July 12, 1998^{[J]}	Frauenfeld	Switzerland	Openair Frauenfeld	—N/a	—N/a
Oceania
August 19, 1998	Melbourne	Australia	Mercury Lounge	—N/a	—N/a
August 21, 1998	Melbourne	Australia	Rod Laver Arena	—N/a	—N/a
August 22, 1998	Melbourne	Australia	Rod Laver Arena	—N/a	—N/a
August 24, 1998	Adelaide	Australia	Adelaide Entertainment Centre	—N/a	—N/a
August 26, 1998	Perth	Australia	Burswood Dome	—N/a	—N/a
August 28, 1998	Darwin	Australia	Darwin Amphitheatre	—N/a	—N/a
August 30, 1998	Townsville	Australia	Townsville Entertainment Centre	—N/a	—N/a
September 1, 1998	Brisbane	Australia	Brisbane Entertainment Centre	—N/a	—N/a
September 3, 1998	Sydney	Australia	Sydney Entertainment Centre	—N/a	—N/a
September 4, 1998	Sydney	Australia	Sydney Entertainment Centre	—N/a	—N/a
September 5, 1998	Wollongong	Australia	WIN Entertainment Centre	—N/a	—N/a
September 7, 1998	Auckland	New Zealand	North Shore Events Centre	—N/a	—N/a
September 8, 1998	Auckland	New Zealand	North Shore Events Centre	—N/a	—N/a
September 10, 1998	Wellington	New Zealand	Queens Wharf Events Centre	—N/a	—N/a
September 12, 1998	Christchurch	New Zealand	Christchurch Entertainment Centre	—N/a	—N/a
