= Never Ending Tour 2007 =

2007 concert tour by Bob Dylan

- Tour by Bob Dylan
- Poster to the concert in Ottawa, Canada
- Start date: March 27, 2007
- End date: October 29, 2007
- Legs: 4
- No. of shows: 58 in North America; 28 in Europe; 12 in Oceania; 98 in total

Bob Dylan concert chronology
- Never Ending Tour 2006 (2006); Never Ending Tour 2007 (2007); Never Ending Tour 2008 (2008)

The Never Ending Tour is the popular name for Bob Dylan's endless touring schedule since June 7, 1988.

== Information ==
The tour started off in Europe in a small venue called Debaser Medis in Stockholm, Sweden and continued on to the Globe Arena and the rest of Europe.

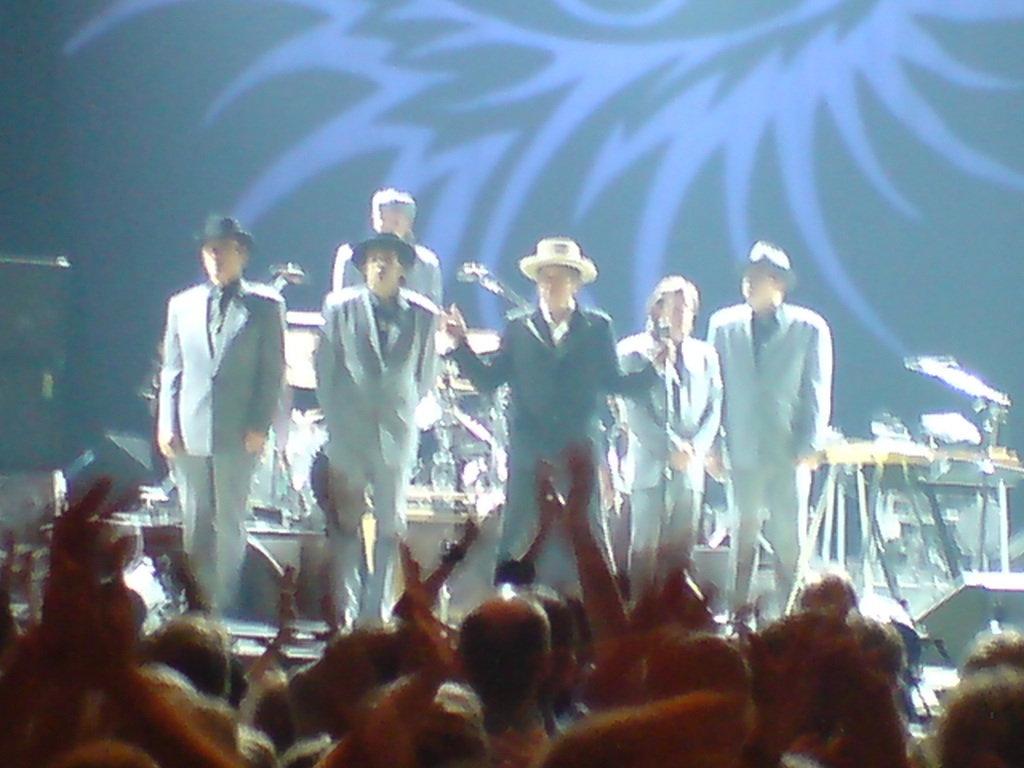
Dylan in Copenhagen, Denmark

Dylan performed six shows in the United Kingdom, one in Scotland and five in England, performing two nights at London's Wembley Arena. This was the eleventh and twelfth time Dylan had performed at the Arena.

After completing his European tour Dylan and his band traveled to North America to perform a twenty-seven date tour comprising twenty-six concerts in the United States and five concerts in Canada. The tour started with two performances at The Borgata in Atlantic City, New Jersey on June 22 and June 23. The tour finished on July 28 in Kelseyville, California.

Dylan traveled to New Zealand and Australia to perform a series of twelve concerts over twenty days. The tour included two performances at the Sydney Entertainment Centre and two performances at the Rod Laver Arena in Melbourne.

Dylan traveled back from Oceania to perform a further thirty-one concerts in the United States. This leg of the tour also contained Dylan's 2000th performance on the Never Ending Tour. This date was October 16 at the Nutter Center in Fairborn, Ohio. The tour came to an end thirteen days later after a three-night residency at the Chicago Theatre.

== Tour dates ==
Date	City	Country	Venue
Europe
March 27, 2007	Stockholm	Sweden	Debaser Medis
March 28, 2007	Stockholm	Sweden	Stockholm Globe Arena
March 30, 2007	Oslo	Norway	Oslo Spektrum
April 1, 2007	Gothenburg	Sweden	Scandinavium
April 2, 2007	Copenhagen	Denmark	Forum Copenhagen
April 4, 2007	Hamburg	Germany	Color Line Arena
April 5, 2007	Münster	Germany	Halle Münsterland
April 6, 2007	Brussels	Belgium	Forest National
April 8, 2007	Amsterdam	Netherlands	Heineken Music Hall
April 9, 2007	Amsterdam	Netherlands	Heineken Music Hall
April 11, 2007	Glasgow	Scotland	Scottish Exhibition and Conference Centre
April 12, 2007	Newcastle	England	Metro Radio Arena
April 14, 2007	Sheffield	England	Motorpoint Arena
April 15, 2007	London	England	Wembley Arena
April 16, 2007	London	England	Wembley Arena
April 17, 2007	Birmingham	England	National Indoor Arena
April 19, 2007	Düsseldorf	Germany	Philipshalle
April 20, 2007	Stuttgart	Germany	Porsche Arena
April 21, 2007	Frankfurt	Germany	Jahrhunderthalle
April 23, 2007	Paris	France	Palais Omnisports de Paris-Bercy
April 25, 2007	Geneva	Switzerland	SEG Geneva Arena
April 26, 2007	Turin	Italy	Torino Palasport Olimpico
April 27, 2007	Milan	Italy	Mediolanum Forum
April 29, 2007	Zürich	Switzerland	Hallenstadion
April 30, 2007	Mannheim	Germany	SAP Arena
May 2, 2007	Leipzig	Germany	Leipzig Arena
May 3, 2007	Berlin	Germany	Max Schmeling Halle
May 5, 2007	Herning	Denmark	Messecenter Herning
North America (First Leg)
June 22, 2007	Atlantic City	United States	Borgata Events Center
June 23, 2007	Atlantic City	United States	Borgata Events Center
June 24, 2007	Hershey	United States	Star Pavilion
June 26, 2007	Florence	United States	Pines Theatre
June 27, 2007	Uncasville	United States	Mohegan Sun Arena
June 29, 2007	Wantagh	United States	Jones Beach Theatre
June 30, 2007	Bethel	United States	Bethel Woods Center for the Arts
July 1, 2007	Essex Junction	United States	Coca-Cola Grandstand
July 3, 2007	Quebec City	Canada	Colisée Pepsi
July 4, 2007^{[A]}	Montreal	Canada	Salle Wilfrid-Pelletier
July 5, 2007^{[B]}	Ottawa	Canada	LeBreton Flats Park
July 7, 2007	Orillia	Canada	Entertainment Centre
July 8, 2007	Orillia	Canada	Entertainment Centre
July 10, 2007^{[C]}	Interlochen	United States	Kresge Auditorium
July 11, 2007	Sterling Heights	United States	Freedom Hill Amphitheater
July 12, 2007	Toleda	United States	Toledo Zoo Amphitheater
July 14, 2007	Cleveland	United States	Plain Dealer Pavilion
July 15, 2007	Indianapolis	United States	The Lawn
July 16, 2007	Kansas City	United States	Starlight Theatre
July 19, 2007	Morrison	United States	Red Rocks Amphitheatre
July 20, 2007	Morrison	United States	Red Rocks Amphitheatre
July 21, 2007	Telluride	United States	Town Park
July 22, 2007	Albuquerque	United States	The Pavilion
July 24, 2007	Tucson	United States	Anselmo Valencia Tori Amphitheater
July 26, 2007^{[D]}	Costa Mesa	United States	Pacific Amphitheatre
July 27, 2007	Paso Robles	United States	Grandstand
July 28, 2007	Kelseyville	United States	Konocti Harbor
Oceania
August 8, 2007	Christchurch	New Zealand	Westpac Arena
August 10, 2007	Wellington	New Zealand	TSB Bank Arena
August 11, 2007	Auckland	New Zealand	Vector Arena
August 13, 2007	Brisbane	Australia	Brisbane Entertainment Centre
August 15, 2007	Sydney	Australia	Sydney Entertainment Centre
August 16, 2007	Sydney	Australia	Sydney Entertainment Centre
August 17, 2007	Melbourne	Australia	Rod Laver Arena
August 19, 2007	Melbourne	Australia	Rod Laver Arena
August 21, 2007	Adelaide	Australia	Adelaide Entertainment Centre
August 23, 2007	Perth	Australia	Burswood Dome
August 26, 2007	Auckland	New Zealand	Auckland Civic Theatre
August 27, 2007	Auckland	New Zealand	Auckland Civic Theatre
North America (Second Leg)
September 15, 2007	Austin	United States	Waller Creek Outdoor Amphitheater
September 16, 2007^{[E]}	Austin	United States	AT&T Blue Room Stage
September 19, 2007	Nashville	United States	Ryman Auditorium
September 20, 2007	Nashville	United States	Ryman Auditorium
September 22, 2007	Duluth	United States	Arena at Gwinnett Center
September 23, 2007	Clemson	United States	Littlejohn Coliseum
September 25, 2007	Norfolk	United States	Ted Constant Convocation Center
September 27, 2007	Charlottesville	United States	John Paul Jones Arena
September 28, 2007	Columbia	United States	Merriweather Post Pavilion
September 29, 2007	Kingston	United States	Ryan Center
September 30, 2007	Bridgeport	United States	Webster Bank Arena
October 2, 2007	Worcester	United States	DCU Center
October 4, 2007	Portland	United States	Cumberland County Civic Center
October 5, 2007	Manchester	United States	Verizon Wireless Arena
October 6, 2007	Albany	United States	Times Union Center
October 8, 2007	Syracuse	United States	Oncenter War Memorial Arena
October 9, 2007	Rochester	United States	RIT Gordon Field House
October 11, 2007	Pittsburgh	United States	Petersen Events Center
October 12, 2007	Ypsilanti	United States	Convocation Center
October 13, 2007	Columbus	United States	Jerome Schottenstein Center
October 15, 2007	Cincinnati	United States	Taft Theatre
October 16, 2007	Fairborn	United States	Nutter Center
October 17, 2007	Louisville	United States	Freedom Hall
October 19, 2007	Bloomington	United States	Assembly Hall
October 20, 2007	Bloomington	United States	U.S. Cellular Coliseum
October 22, 2007	St. Louis	United States	Fox Theatre
October 24, 2007	Iowa City	United States	Carver–Hawkeye Arena
October 26, 2007	Omaha	United States	Qwest Center Omaha
October 27, 2007	Chicago	United States	Chicago Theatre
October 28, 2007	Chicago	United States	Chicago Theatre
October 29, 2007	Chicago	United States	Chicago Theatre

Festivals and other miscellaneous performances

^{A} This concert was a part of "Montreal International Jazz Festival".
^{B} This concert was a part of "Ottawa Bluesfest".
^{C} This concert was a part of "Summer Arts Festival".
^{D} This concert was a part of "Orange County Fair".
^{E} This concert was a part of "Austin City Limits Music Festival".

=== Box office score data ===
Venue	City	Tickets sold / available	Shows
Debaser Medis	Stockholm, Sweden	800 / 800 (100%)	1/1
Heineken Music Hall	Amsterdam, Netherlands	11,000 / 11,000 (100%)	2/2
Kresge Auditorium	Interlochen, Michigan	3,943 / 3,943 (100%)	1/1
