= Never Ending Tour 1995 =

1995 concert tour by Bob Dylan

- Tour by Bob Dylan
- Poster to the concert in Valencia, Spain
- Start date: March 11, 1995
- End date: December 17, 1995
- Legs: 5
- No. of shows: 115

Bob Dylan concert chronology
- Never Ending Tour 1994 (1994); Never Ending Tour 1995 (1995); Never Ending Tour 1996 (1996)

The Never Ending Tour is the popular name for Bob Dylan's endless touring schedule since June 7, 1988.

== Background ==
The Never Ending Tour 1995 started in early March in the Czech Republic. The tour moved on to Germany, the Netherlands, France and Belgium. Dylan performed a large number of concerts in the United Kingdom performing three concerts in London, three in Manchester, two in Edinburgh, one in Glasgow, one in Birmingham, one in Cardiff, one in Brighton as well as one concert in Belfast. The tour finished the following day in Dublin.

Just under a month later Dylan returned to the United States to perform a twenty-nine concert tour including three performances in Los Angeles, California and three concerts in Seattle, Washington.

Dylan returned to Europe four days later to perform nineteen concerts. Dylan performed seven concerts in Germany, six concerts in Spain as well as performing at the Roskilde Festival.

At the end of September Dylan kicked off another leg of the 1995 Never Ending Tour starting in Fort Lauderdale, Florida. The tour came to an end on November 11 in Paradise, Nevada. Dylan continued to tour North America in small club venues into late December. The Never Ending Tour 1995 came to an end on December 17 in Philadelphia, Pennsylvania after one-hundred and sixteen shows.

== Tour dates ==
List of concerts, showing date, city, country and venues.
Date	City	Country	Venue
Europe
March 11, 1995	Prague	Czech Republic	Prague Congress Centre
March 12, 1995	Prague	Czech Republic	Prague Congress Centre
March 13, 1995	Prague	Czech Republic	Prague Congress Centre
March 14, 1995	Fürth	Germany	Stadthalle Fürth
March 15, 1995	Aschaffenburg	Germany	Unterfrankenhalle
March 16, 1995	Bielefeld	Germany	Stadthalle Bielefeld
March 18, 1995	Groningen	Netherlands	Martinihal Groningen
March 19, 1995	Kerkrade	Netherlands	Rodahal
March 20, 1995	Utrecht	Netherlands	Muziekcentrum Vredenburg
March 22, 1995	Lille	France	Zénith de Lille
March 23, 1995	Brussels	Belgium	Forest National
March 24, 1995	Paris	France	Zénith de Paris
March 26, 1995	Brighton	England	Brighton Centre
March 27, 1995	Cardiff	Wales	Cardiff International Arena
March 29, 1995	London	England	Brixton Academy
March 30, 1995	London	England	Brixton Academy
March 31, 1995	London	England	Brixton Academy
April 2, 1995	Birmingham	England	Aston Villa Leisure Centre
April 3, 1995	Manchester	England	Manchester Apollo
April 4, 1995	Manchester	England	Manchester Apollo
April 5, 1995	Manchester	England	Manchester Apollo
April 6, 1995	Edinburgh	Scotland	Edinburgh Playhouse
April 7, 1995	Edinburgh	Scotland	Edinburgh Playhouse
April 9, 1995	Glasgow	Scotland	Scottish Exhibition and Conference Centre
April 10, 1995	Belfast	Northern Ireland	King's Hall
April 11, 1995	Dublin	Ireland	Point Theatre
North America
May 10, 1995	San Diego	United States	Embarcadero Marina Park South
May 12, 1995	Las Vegas	United States	The Joint
May 13, 1995	Las Vegas	United States	The Joint
May 15, 1995	Palm Desert	United States	McCallum Theatre
May 17, 1995	Los Angeles	United States	Hollywood Palladium
May 18, 1995	Los Angeles	United States	Hollywood Palladium
May 19, 1995	Los Angeles	United States	Hollywood Palladium
May 20, 1995	Santa Barbara	United States	Santa Barbara Bowl
May 22, 1995	San Francisco	United States	The Warfield
May 23, 1995	San Francisco	United States	The Warfield
May 25, 1995	Berkeley	United States	Berkeley Community Theatre
May 26, 1995	Berkeley	United States	Berkeley Community Theatre
May 27, 1995 (Note: The May 27, 1995 concert in Monterey was part of Laguna Seca Daze.)	Monterey	United States	Laguna Seca Raceway
May 28, 1995	Reno	United States	Reno Hilton Amphitheater
May 30, 1995	Eugene	United States	Hult Center for the Performing Arts
May 31, 1995	Eugene	United States	Hult Center for the Performing Arts
June 2, 1995	Seattle	United States	Paramount Theatre
June 3, 1995	Seattle	United States	Paramount Theatre
June 4, 1995	Seattle	United States	Paramount Theatre
June 6, 1995	Portland	United States	Arlene Schnitzer Concert Hall
June 7, 1995	Spokane	United States	Riverfront Park
June 15, 1995	Highgate	United States	Franklin County State Airport
June 16, 1995	Boston	United States	Harborlights Pavilion
June 18, 1995 (Note: Supporting the Grateful Dead.)	East Rutherford	United States	Giants Stadium
June 19, 1995	East Rutherford	United States	Giants Stadium
June 21, 1995	Philadelphia	United States	Theatre of Living Arts
June 22, 1995	Philadelphia	United States	Theatre of Living Arts
June 24, 1995	Washington, D.C.	United States	Robert F. Kennedy Memorial Stadium
June 25, 1995	Washington, D.C.	United States	Robert F. Kennedy Memorial Stadium
Europe
June 29, 1995	Oslo	Norway	Oslo Spektrum
July 1, 1995 (Note: The July 1, 1995 concert in Roskilde was part of Roskilde Festival.)	Roskilde	Denmark	Dyrskuepladsen
July 2, 1995	Hamburg	Germany	Hamburg Stadtpark
July 3, 1995	Hanover	Germany	Music Hall
July 4, 1995	Berlin	Germany	Tempodrom
July 7, 1995	Glauchau	Germany	Freilichtbühne
July 8, 1995	Munich	Germany	Terminal 1
July 10, 1995	Stuttgart	Germany	Kongresszentrum
July 12, 1995	Dortmund	Germany	Westfalenhallen
July 14, 1995 (Note: The July 14, 1995 concert in Stratford-upon-Avon was part of Phoenix Festival.)	Stratford-upon-Avon	England	Long Marston Airfield
July 16, 1995	Bilbao	Spain	Plaza de Toros de Vista Alegre
July 19, 1995	Madrid	Spain	Campo Municipal Deportes
July 20, 1995	Cartagena	Spain	Puerto Deportivo de Cartagena
July 21, 1995	Valencia	Spain	Luis Puig Palace
July 24, 1995	Barcelona	Spain	Poble Espanyol
July 25, 1995	Zaragoza	Spain	Pabellón Príncipe Felipe
July 27, 1995 (Note: Supporting The Rolling Stones.)	Montpellier	France	Espace Grammont
July 28, 1995	Vienne	France	Théatre Romain Antique
July 30, 1995 (Note: The July 30, 1995 concert in Stratford-upon-Avon was part of Paléo Festival.)	Nyon	Switzerland	L'Asse
North America
September 27, 1995	North Fort Myers	United States	Lee County Civic Center
September 28, 1995	Sunrise	United States	Sunrise Musical Theater
September 29, 1995	Sunrise	United States	Sunrise Musical Theater
September 30, 1995	Tampa	United States	USF Sun Dome
October 2, 1995	Fort Pierce	United States	St. Lucie County Civic Center
October 5, 1995	Orlando	United States	UCF Arena
October 6, 1995	Jacksonville	United States	Riverview Music Shed
October 7, 1995	Charleston	United States	King Street Palace
October 9, 1995	Savannah	United States	Johnny Mercer Theater
October 10, 1995	Augusta	United States	Bell Auditorium
October 11, 1995	Atlanta	United States	Fox Theatre
October 12, 1995	Dothan	United States	Dothan Civic Center
October 14, 1995	Biloxi	United States	Mississippi Coast Coliseum
October 15, 1995	Thibodaux	United States	Warren J. Harang Jr. Municipal Auditorium
October 16, 1995	New Orleans	United States	McAlister Auditorium
October 18, 1995	Birmingham	United States	Alabama Theatre
October 19, 1995	Memphis	United States	Mud Island Amphitheatre
October 24, 1995	Minneapolis	United States	Target Center
October 25, 1995	Rockford	United States	Coronado Theatre
October 26, 1995	Bloomington	United States	Indiana University Auditorium
October 27, 1995	St. Louis	United States	American Theater
October 29, 1995	Springfield	United States	Juanita K. Hammons Hall
October 30, 1995	Little Rock	United States	Robinson Auditorium
November 1, 1995	Houston	United States	Houston Music Hall
November 3, 1995	San Antonio	United States	Majestic Theatre
November 4, 1995	Austin	United States	Austin Music Hall
November 5, 1995	Austin	United States	Austin Music Hall
November 7, 1995	Dallas	United States	Dallas Music Complex
November 9, 1995	Phoenix	United States	Phoenix Symphony Hall
November 10, 1995	Las Vegas	United States	The Joint
November 11, 1995	Las Vegas	United States	The Joint
December 7, 1995	Danbury	United States	O'Neill Center
December 8, 1995	Worcester	United States	Worcester Memorial Auditorium
December 9, 1995	Boston	United States	The Orpheum
December 10, 1995	Boston	United States	The Orpheum
December 11, 1995	New York City	United States	Beacon Theatre
December 13, 1995	Bethlehem	United States	Stabler Arena
December 14, 1995	New York City	United States	Beacon Theatre
December 15, 1995	Philadelphia	United States	Electric Factory
December 16, 1995	Philadelphia	United States	Electric Factory
December 17, 1995	Philadelphia	United States	Electric Factory
