= Never Ending Tour 1994 =

1994 concert tour by Bob Dylan

- Tour by Bob Dylan
- Poster to the concerts in Yokohama & Tokyo, Japan
- Start date: February 5, 1994
- End date: November 13, 1994
- Legs: 5
- No. of shows: 104

Bob Dylan concert chronology
- Never Ending Tour 1993 (1993); Never Ending Tour 1994 (1994); Never Ending Tour 1995 (1995)

The Never Ending Tour is the popular name for Bob Dylan's endless touring schedule since June 7, 1988.

== Background ==
The Never Ending Tour 1994 started with eleven concerts in Japan. Two days later Dylan performed in Malaysia, his first and to date, only concert there to date. Dylan then went on to perform concerts in Singapore and Hong Kong.

On April 5, Dylan started a twenty-five stop date of North America starting in Springfield, Illinois, and coming to an end just over a month later in Memphis, Tennessee.

Prior to continuing to tour in Europe, he returned to Japan, performing at The Great Music Experience on May 20–22.

Dylan travelled to Europe in midsummer to perform seventeen concerts in Europe, his only performances there of 1994.

Sixteen days after completing his European tour, Dylan returned to the United States to perform fifteen concerts including his triumph performance at Woodstock '94. After being injured in a traffic accident in 1966, and his subsequent disappearance from the popular music scene, Dylan declined to go to the original Woodstock Festival of 1969, even though he lived in the area at the time and the festival had been put in his backyard to try to get him to come out and play. He set off for the Isle of Wight Festival the day the Woodstock festival started, and performed at Woodside Bay on August 31, 1969. Dylan, however, did accept an invitation to perform at Woodstock '94, and was introduced with the phrase: "We waited twenty-five years to hear this, Ladies and gentlemen, Mr. Bob Dylan!" According to various critics, Dylan's performance was one of the greater moments of the festival, and represented the beginning of another one of the new phases in his lengthy career.

Dylan continued his United States Tour on October 1 in Ithaca, New York. The tour continued through the fall in the eastern United States ending on November 13 in New Orleans, Louisiana. Inspired by the success of his appearance at Woodstock ’94 Dylan performed on MTV Unplugged which resulted in the live album "MTV Unplugged"

== Tour dates ==
List of concerts, showing date, city, country and venues.
Date	City	Country	Venue
Asia
February 5, 1994	Sendai	Japan	Sendai Sun Plaza
February 7, 1994	Yokohama	Japan	Yokohama Cultural Gymnasium
February 8, 1994	Tokyo	Japan	Nippon Budokan
February 9, 1994	Tokyo	Japan	Nippon Budokan
February 11, 1994	Nagoya	Japan	Century Hall
February 12, 1994	Osaka	Japan	Osaka-jō Hall
February 14, 1994	Kokura	Japan	Kyushu Koseinenkin Kaikan
February 15, 1994	Kokura	Japan	Kyushu Koseinenkin Kaikan
February 16, 1994	Hiroshima	Japan	Hiroshima Prefectural Sports Center
February 18, 1994	Urawa	Japan	Urawa-Shi Bunka Center
February 20, 1994	Tokyo	Japan	NHK Hall
February 22, 1994	Kuala Lumpur	Malaysia	Merdeka Hall
February 24, 1994	Singapore		Singapore Indoor Stadium
February 25, 1994	Hong Kong		Hong Kong Coliseum
North America
April 5, 1994	Springfield	United States	Sangamon Auditorium
April 6, 1994	Davenport	United States	Adler Theater
April 7, 1994	Ames	United States	C.Y. Stephens Auditorium
April 9, 1994	Lawrence	United States	Lied Center of Kansas
April 10, 1994	St. Louis	United States	Fox Theatre
April 12, 1994	Rockford	United States	Coronado Theatre
April 13, 1994	Peoria	United States	Peoria Civic Center Theater
April 15, 1994	Ashwaubenon	United States	Brown County Veterans Memorial Arena
April 16, 1994	Valparaiso	United States	Athletics–Recreation Center
April 17, 1994	Chicago	United States	Riviera Theatre
April 18, 1994	Chicago	United States	Riviera Theatre
April 20, 1994	Champaign	United States	Assembly Hall
April 22, 1994	Fort Wayne	United States	Allen County War Memorial Coliseum
April 23, 1994	Milwaukee	United States	Riverside Theater
April 24, 1994	Rochester	United States	Mayo Civic Center
April 26, 1994	Sioux City	United States	Sioux City Municipal Auditorium
April 27, 1994	Lincoln	United States	Lied Center for Performing Arts
April 28, 1994	Topeka	United States	Topeka Performing Arts Center
April 30, 1994	Springfield	United States	Hammons Hall for the Performing Arts
May 1, 1994	Columbia	United States	Jesse Auditorium
May 3, 1994	Evansville	United States	Roberts Municipal Stadium
May 5, 1994	Bristol	United States	Viking Hall
May 6, 1994	Spartanburg	United States	Spartanburg Memorial Auditorium
May 7, 1994	Chattanooga	United States	Soldiers and Sailors Memorial Auditorium
May 8, 1994 (Note: The May 8, 1994, concert in Memphis was part of Memphis in May.)	Memphis	United States	Tom Lee Park
Europe
July 3, 1994 (Note: The July 3, 1994, concert in Paris was part of La Fête de la Fraternité.)	Paris	France	Parc Departemental du Bourget
July 4, 1994	Besançon	France	Palais Des Sports de Besançon
July 5, 1994	Lyon	France	Ancient Theatre of Fourvière
July 7, 1994	Sanremo	Italy	Stadio Comunale di Sanremo
July 8, 1994 (Note: The July 8, 1994, concert in Milan was part of Sonoria Festival.)	Milan	Italy	Parco Acquatico Milano
July 9, 1994	Balingen	Germany	Messegelände Balingen
July 10, 1994	Cologne	Germany	Tanzbrunnen
July 12, 1994 (Note: The July 12, 1994, concert in Montreux was part of Montreux Jazz Festival.)	Montreux	Switzerland	Stravinsky Hall
July 14, 1994	Graz	Austria	Schwarzl Freizeit Zentrum
July 15, 1994 (Note: The July 15, 1994, concert in Vienna was part of Jazz Fest Wien.)	Vienna	Austria	Hohe Warte
July 16, 1994	Prague	Czech Republic	Sportovni Hala
July 17, 1994 (Note: The July 17, 1994, concert in Kraków was ended after one hour due to heavy rain.)	Kraków	Poland	Stadion Miejski Cracovii
July 19, 1994	Warsaw	Poland	Congress Hall
July 21, 1994	Dresden	Germany	Großer Garten
July 23, 1994	Halle	Germany	Freilichtbühne Peißnitz
July 24, 1994	Gotha	Germany	Friedenstein Palace
July 25, 1994	Kiel	Germany	Ostseehalle
North America
August 10, 1994	Portland	United States	State Theatre
August 11, 1994	Patterson	United States	Big Birch Concert Pavilion
August 12, 1994	Stratton	United States	Mountain Ski Resort
August 14, 1994 (Note: The August 14, 1994, concert in Saugerties was part of Woodstock '94.)	Saugerties	United States	Saugerties Field
August 16, 1994	Lewiston	United States	Earl W. Brydges Artpark State Park
August 17, 1994	Hershey	United States	Hersheypark Stadium
August 19, 1994	Pittsburgh	United States	Station Square
August 20, 1994	Cleveland	United States	Nautica Stage
August 21, 1994 (Note: The August 21, 1994, concert in Columbus was part of Ohio State Fair.)	Columbus	United States	Celeste Center
August 23, 1994	Louisville	United States	Palace Theatre
August 24, 1994	South Bend	United States	Morris Performing Arts Center
August 26, 1994	Merrillville	United States	Star Plaza Theatre
August 27, 1994	Kalamazoo	United States	State Theatre
August 28, 1994	Kalamazoo	United States	State Theatre
August 29, 1994 (Note: The August 29, 1994, concert in Detroit was part of Michigan State Fair.)	Detroit	United States	Michigan State Fairgrounds Coliseum
October 1, 1994	Ithaca	United States	Ben Light Gymnasium
October 2, 1994	Amherst	United States	LeFrak Gymnasium
October 4, 1994	Portland	United States	State Theatre
October 5, 1994	Portland	United States	State Theatre
October 7, 1994	Boston	United States	The Orpheum
October 8, 1994	Boston	United States	The Orpheum
October 9, 1994	Boston	United States	The Orpheum
October 11, 1994	Burlington	United States	Flynn Center for the Performing Arts
October 12, 1994	Providence	United States	Providence Performing Arts Center
October 14, 1994	Albany	United States	Palace Theatre
October 15, 1994	West Point	United States	Eisenhower Hall Theatre
October 16, 1994	New Haven	United States	Palace Theatre
October 18, 1994	New York City	United States	Roseland Ballroom
October 19, 1994	New York City	United States	Roseland Ballroom
October 20, 1994	New York City	United States	Roseland Ballroom
October 22, 1994	Rochester	United States	Auditorium Theatre
October 23, 1994	Syracuse	United States	Landmark Theatre
October 25, 1994	Wilkes-Barre	United States	F.M. Kirby Center
October 26, 1994	Salisbury	United States	Wicomico Youth and Civic Center
October 27, 1994	Upper Darby Township	United States	The Tower Theater
October 28, 1994	Upper Darby Township	United States	The Tower Theater
October 30, 1994	Washington, D.C.	United States	Warner Theatre
October 31, 1994	Washington, D.C.	United States	Warner Theatre
November 1, 1994	Norfolk	United States	Chrysler Hall
November 2, 1994	Roanoke	United States	Roanoke Civic Center Auditorium
November 4, 1994	Gainesville	United States	Georgia Mountains Center
November 5, 1994	Knoxville	United States	Tennessee Theatre
November 6, 1994	Asheville	United States	Thomas Wolfe Auditorium
November 8, 1994	Nashville	United States	Ryman Auditorium
November 9, 1994	Nashville	United States	Ryman Auditorium
November 10, 1994	Jackson	United States	Oman Arena
November 12, 1994	New Orleans	United States	House of Blues
November 13, 1994	New Orleans	United States	House of Blues
