= Indiana University Auditorium =

Concert hall in Bloomington, Indiana, US

Coordinates: 39°10′6.5″N 86°31′5.5″W

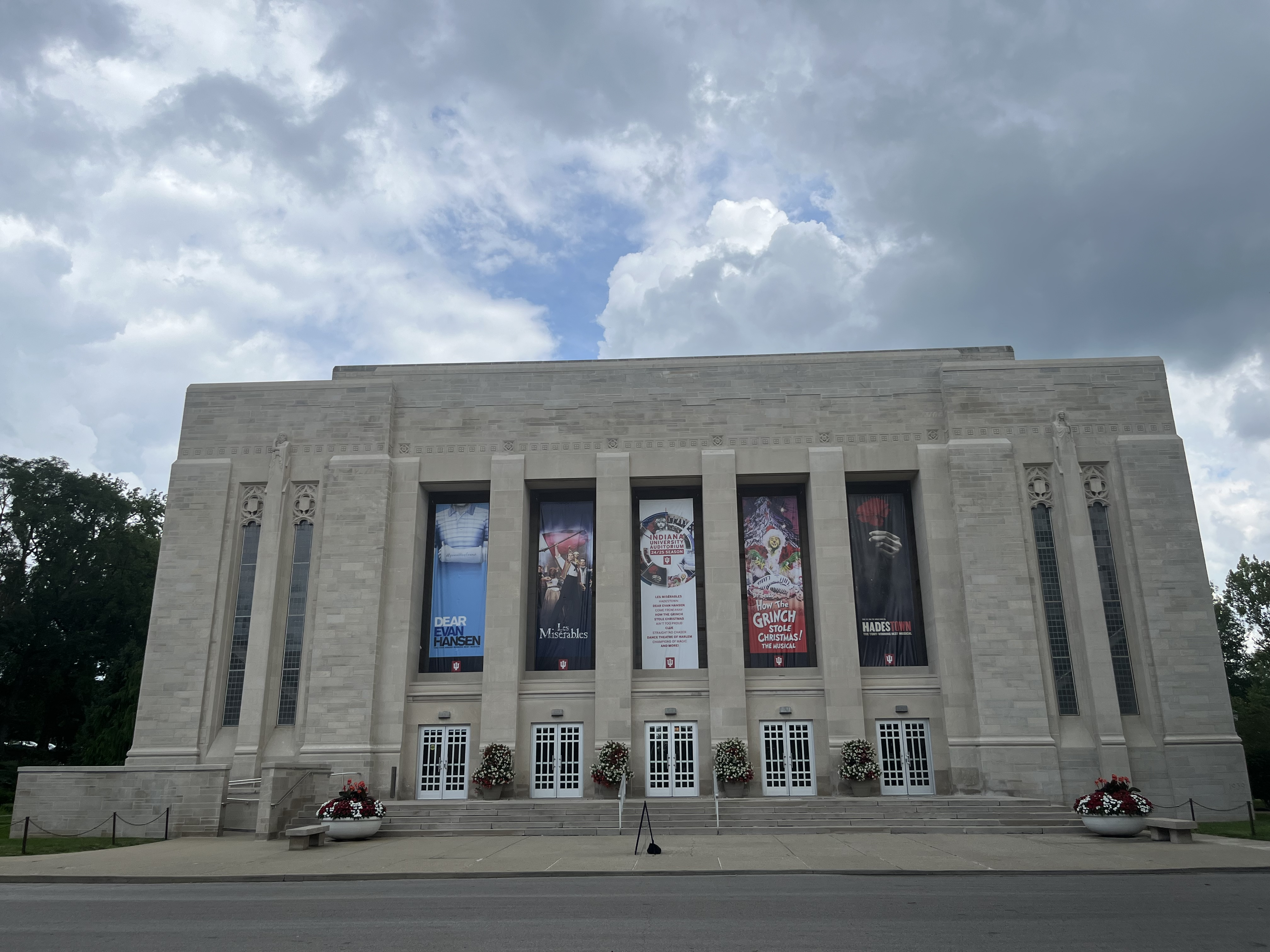
- The auditorium in July 2024
- Interactive map of Indiana University Auditorium
- Location: Bloomington, Indiana
- Owner: Indiana University Bloomington
- Capacity: 3,200
- Type: Auditorium

Construction
- Opened: 1941-03-22

Website
- www.iuauditorium.com

Indiana University Auditorium (IU Auditorium), is a 3,200-seat performing arts venue located at Indiana University in Bloomington, Indiana. It is situated in IU's Fine Arts Plaza alongside the Lilly Library and the Eskenazi School of Art, Architecture + Design.

Construction on IU Auditorium began in 1939 as a part of the Federal Works Agency Projects. It officially opened its doors on March 22, 1941.

IU Auditorium presents Broadway touring acts, popular musical artists, comedians, and classical musicians.
