= TWHS =

TWHS may refer to:

- The Woodlands High School, The Woodlands, Texas, United States
- Thomas Worthington High School, Worthington, Ohio, United States
- Tri-West Hendricks High School, Lizton, Indiana, United States
- Tulare Western High School, Tulare, California, United States

== See also ==
- TWH (disambiguation)
