= Never Ending Tour 2000 =

2000 concert tour by Bob Dylan

- Tour by Bob Dylan
- Poster to the concert in Nampa, USA
- Start date: March 10, 2000
- End date: November 19, 2000
- Legs: 5
- No. of shows: 75 in North America; 37 in Europe; 112 in Total

Bob Dylan concert chronology
- Never Ending Tour 1999 (1999); Never Ending Tour 2000 (2000); Never Ending Tour 2001 (2001)

The Never Ending Tour is the popular name for Bob Dylan's endless touring schedule since June 7, 1988.

== Background ==
The 2000 Never Ending Tour started in North America with two performances in one day at the Anaheim Sun Theatre in Anaheim, California on March 10. The tour closed in Denver, Colorado on April 6 at the Fillmore Auditorium. This was Dylan's ninth concert in Denver.

On May 6 Dylan started a nineteen date European spring tour performing seven concerts in Germany, five concerts in Italy, three concerts in Sweden, one concert in Denmark, Norway, Finland and Switzerland. Dylan performed in Horsens, Denmark on May 21, Dylan's first performance in the city.

After finishing his brief European tour Dylan returned to North America to perform 31 concerts the United States and a single concert in Toronto, Ontario, Canada. Dylan also performed a further seventeen concerts in the United States in late October and November.

After finishing the United States summer tour Dylan and his band returned to Europe to perform a further eighteen concerts, mainly taking place in the United Kingdom. He also performed two concerts in Ireland, three concerts in Germany, one concert in the Netherlands and Belgium as well as two concerts in France. Dylan performed the first concert of the tour at Vicar Street in Dublin, Ireland which was added due to high demand for tickets at the Point Depot show the following day.

The tour came to a close in Towson, Maryland on November 19 at the Towson State University after one-hundred and ten shows.

== Tour dates ==
Date	City	Country	Venue
North America (first leg)
March 10, 2000^{[A]}	Anaheim	United States	The Sun Theatre
March 11, 2000	San Luis Obispo	United States	California Polytechnic State University
March 12, 2000	Bakersfield	United States	Bakersfield Centennial Garden
March 14, 2000	Tulare	United States	Convention Center
March 15, 2000	Santa Cruz	United States	Civic Auditorium
March 16, 2000	Santa Cruz	United States	Civic Auditorium
March 17, 2000^{[A]}	Las Vegas	United States	Reno Hilton Theater
March 19, 2000	Pocatello	United States	Holt Arena
March 20, 2000	Nampa	United States	Idaho Center
March 21, 2000	Pullman	United States	Beasley Coliseum
March 22, 2000	Missoula	United States	Harry Adams Event Center
March 24, 2000	Bozeman	United States	Brick Breeden Fieldhouse
March 25, 2000	Billings	United States	Shrine Auditorium
March 26, 2000	Casper	United States	Casper Events Center
March 27, 2000	Rapid City	United States	Rushmore Plaza Civic Center
March 29, 2000	Bismarck	United States	Bismarck Civic Center
March 30, 2000	Fargo	United States	Civic Memorial Auditorium
March 31, 2000	Rochester	United States	Taylor Arena
April 1, 2000	Sioux Falls	United States	Sioux Falls Arena
April 3, 2000	Cedar Rapids	United States	Five Seasons Center
April 4, 2000	Omaha	United States	Omaha Civic Auditorium
April 5, 2000	Salina	United States	Bicentennial Center
April 6, 2000	Denver	United States	Fillmore Auditorium
Europe (First Leg)
May 6, 2000	Zürich	Switzerland	Hallenstadion
May 8, 2000	Stuttgart	Germany	Hanns-Martin-Schleyer-Halle
May 9, 2000	Oberhausen	Germany	König Pilsener Arena
May 11, 2000	Cologne	Germany	Kölnarena
May 12, 2000	Hanover	Germany	Stadionsporthalle
May 13, 2000	Lund	Sweden	Olympen
May 14, 2000	Gothenburg	Sweden	Scandinavium
May 16, 2000	Helsinki	Finland	Hartwall Areena
May 18, 2000	Stockholm	Sweden	Globe Arena
May 19, 2000	Oslo	Norway	Oslo Spektrum
May 21, 2000	Horsens	Denmark	NYA Theatre
May 23, 2000	Berlin	Germany	Treptow Arena
May 24, 2000	Dresden	Germany	Freilichtbühne Junge Garde
May 25, 2000	Regensburg	Germany	Donau Arena
May 27, 2000	Modena	Italy	Piazza Grande
May 28, 2000	Milan	Italy	PalaVobis
May 30, 2000	Florence	Italy	Palasport
May 31, 2000	Ancona	Italy	Palarossini
June 2, 2000	Cagliari	Italy	Molo Ichnusa
North America (second leg)
June 15, 2000	Portland	United States	Roseland Theater
June 16, 2000	Portland	United States	Portland Meadows
June 17, 2000	George	United States	The Gorge Amphitheatre
June 18, 2000	George	United States	The Gorge Amphitheatre
June 20, 2000	Medford	United States	Jackson County Expo Hall
June 21, 2000	Wheatland	United States	Sacramento Valley Amphitheater
June 23, 2000	Concord	United States	Chronicle Pavilion
June 24, 2000	Mountain View	United States	Shoreline Amphitheatre
June 25, 2000	Las Vegas	United States	Reno Hilton Theater
June 27, 2000	Las Vegas	United States	House of Blues
June 29, 2000	Irvine	United States	Verizon Wireless Amphitheater
June 30, 2000	Ventura	United States	Ventura Arena
July 1, 2000	Del Mar	United States	Grandstand
July 3, 2000	Albuquerque	United States	Mesa del Sol Amphitheater
July 6, 2000	Oklahoma City	United States	Zoo Amphitheater
July 7, 2000	Bonner Springs	United States	Sandstone Amphitheater
July 8, 2000	Maryland Heights	United States	Riverport Amphitheater
July 9, 2000	Noblesville	United States	Deer Creek Music Theater
July 11, 2000	Cincinnati	United States	Riverbend Music Center
July 12, 2000	Moline	United States	MARK of the Quad Cities
July 14, 2000	Minneapolis	United States	Target Center
July 15, 2000	East Troy	United States	Alpine Valley Music Theatre
July 16, 2000	Clarkston	United States	Pine Knob Music Theater
July 18, 2000	Toronto	Canada	Molson Amphitheatre
July 19, 2000	Hopewell	United States	Marvin Sands Performing Arts Center
July 21, 2000	Hartford	United States	Meadows Music Theater
July 22, 2000	Mansfield	United States	Center for the Performing Arts
July 23, 2000	Saratoga Springs	United States	Saratoga Performing Arts Center
July 25, 2000	Scranton	United States	Coors Light Amphitheater
July 26, 2000	Wantagh	United States	Jones Beach Theater
July 28, 2000	Baltimore	United States	E-Center
July 29, 2000	Columbia	United States	Merriweather Post Pavilion
July 30, 2000	Stanhope	United States	Waterloo Village
Europe (second leg)
September 13, 2000	Dublin	Ireland	Vicar Street
September 14, 2000	Dublin	Ireland	Point Depot
September 16, 2000	Aberdeen	Scotland	Aberdeen Exhibition and Conference Centre
September 17, 2000	Glasgow	Scotland	Scottish Exhibition and Conference Centre
September 19, 2000	Newcastle	England	Metro Radio Arena
September 20, 2000	Birmingham	England	NEC LG Arena
September 22, 2000	Sheffield	England	Sheffield Arena
September 23, 2000	Cardiff	Wales	Cardiff International Arena
September 24, 2000	Portsmouth	England	Portsmouth Guildhall
September 25, 2000	Portsmouth	England	Portsmouth Guildhall
September 27, 2000	Rotterdam	Netherlands	Rotterdam Ahoy
September 28, 2000	Hamburg	Germany	Alsterdorfer Sporthalle
September 29, 2000	Frankfurt	Germany	Menuhin Saal
October 1, 2000	Münster	Germany	Halle Münsterland
October 2, 2000	Brussels	Belgium	Forest National
October 3, 2000	Paris	France	Zénith de Paris
October 5, 2000	London	England	Wembley Arena
October 6, 2000	London	England	Wembley Arena
North America (third leg)
October 29, 2000	Madison	United States	Kohl Center
October 31, 2000	Evanston	United States	Welsh Ryan McGraw Hall
November 1, 2000	Bloomington	United States	Indiana University Auditorium
November 2, 2000	West Lafayette	United States	Edward C. Elliott Hall of Music
November 4, 2000	Oxford	United States	John D. Millett Hall
November 5, 2000	Ann Arbor	United States	Hill Auditorium
November 6, 2000	Pittsburgh	United States	A. J. Palumbo Center
November 8, 2000	Bethlehem	United States	Stabler Arena
November 10, 2000	Boston	United States	Commonwealth Armory
November 11, 2000	Lowell	United States	Tsongas Center
November 12, 2000	Kingston	United States	Keaney Gymnasium
November 13, 2000	Lewiston	United States	Androscoggin Bank Colisée
November 15, 2000	Salisbury	United States	Youth and Civic Center
November 17, 2000	Princeton	United States	Dillon Gymnasium
November 18, 2000^{[A]}	Atlantic City	United States	Convention Center
November 19, 2000	Towson	United States	Towson Center

Festivals and other miscellaneous performances
^{A} Dylan performed two shows that evening.

Cancellations and rescheduled shows

27 June 2000	Las Vegas, Nevada	Thomas & Mack Center	Cancelled
