= Tulare =

Tulare may refer to:

- USS Tulare (AKA-112), a United States Navy attack cargo ship in commission from 1956 to 1986

== Places ==
=== Serbia ===
- Tulare, Medveđa
- Tulare (Prokuplje)

=== United States ===
- Tulare, California
- Tulare, South Dakota
- Tulare County, California
- Tulare Lake, south Central Valley, California
- Tulare Lake (Alameda County), east Amador Valley, California

== See also ==
- Tulari, in Serbia
