= Jordan Perryman =

American football player (born 1999)

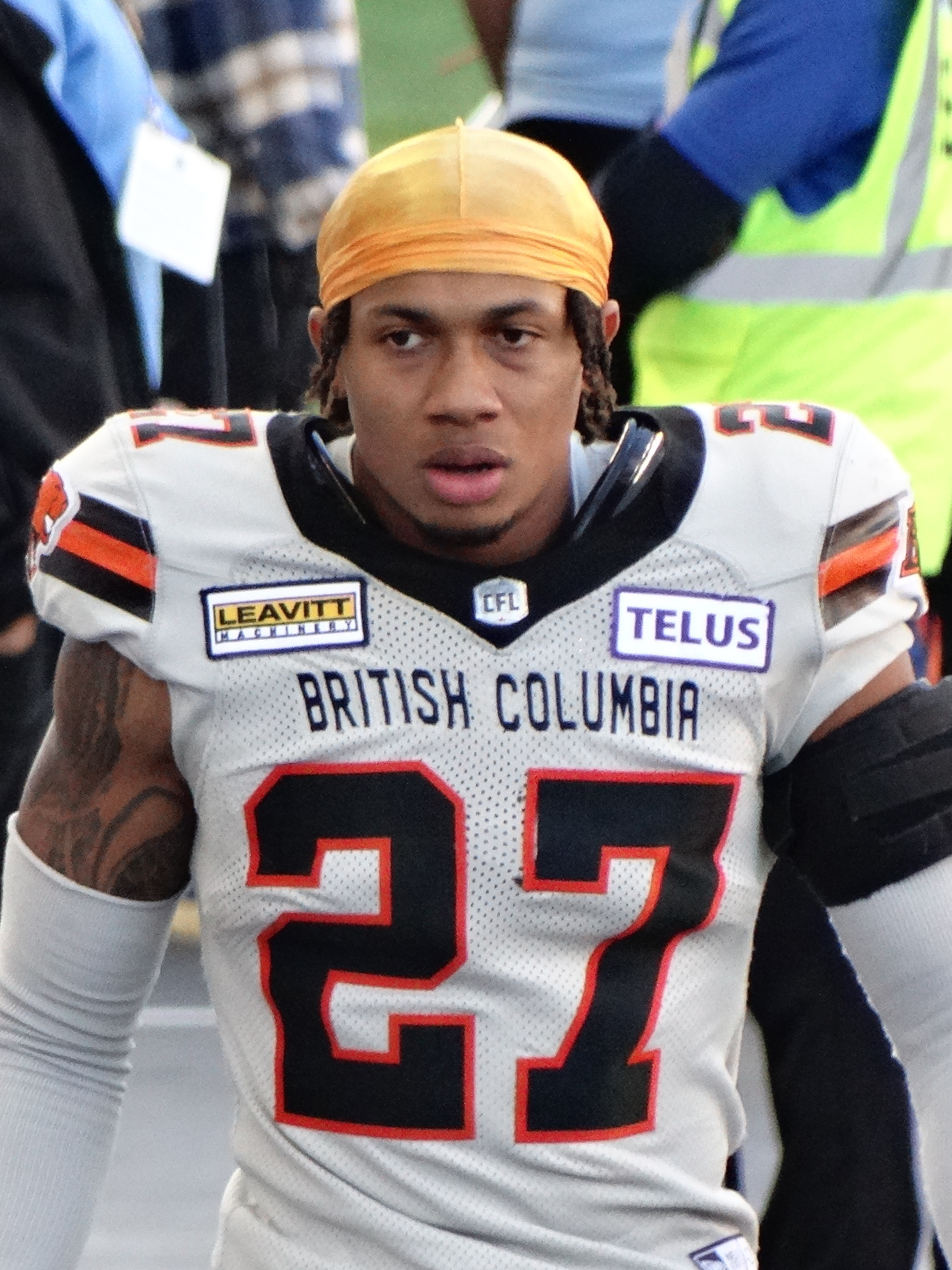
- Perryman with the BC Lions in 2024

Profile
- Position: Defensive back

Personal information
- Born: February 27, 1999 (age 27); Hanford, California, U.S.
- Listed height: 6 ft 0 in (1.83 m)
- Listed weight: 200 lb (91 kg)

Career information
- High school: Hanford
- College: UC Davis (2018–2021); Washington (2022)
- NFL draft: 2023: undrafted

Career history
- Las Vegas Raiders (2023)*; BC Lions (2024); Ottawa Redblacks (2026)*
- * Offseason or practice squad member only

Awards and highlights
- Third-team All-American (2020); 2× First-team All-Big Sky (2020–2021)
- Stats at CFL.ca

Jordan Perryman (born February 27, 1999) is an American professional football defensive back. He played college football at UC Davis and Washington. He has been a member of the Las Vegas Raiders of the National Football League (NFL), and the BC Lions of the Canadian Football League (CFL).

== Early life ==
Perryman was born in Hanford, California. He first attended Lemoore High School for three years before transferring to Hanford High School in Hanford, California. He recorded 1,247 rushing yards and 21 touchdowns his senior season, earning All-West Yosemite League Offensive Player of the Year honors. He also made 94 tackles and seven pass breakups that season.

== College career ==
Perryman first played college football for the UC Davis Aggies from 2018 to 2021. He was redshirted in 2017. He played in all 13 games in 2018, totaling 20 tackles, two interceptions and three pass breakups. Perryman appeared in 11 games in 2019, accumulating 41 tackles, one interception, and two pass breakups. The 2020 season was moved to spring 2021 due to the COVID-19 pandemic. He played in five games during the shortened 2020 season, recording 16 tackles, two pass breakups, and one forced fumble, garnering Phil Steele third team All-American and first team All-Big Sky Conference recognition. Perryman appeared in 12 games during the fall 2021 season, accumulating 63 tackles, one interception, 12 pass breakups, one forced fumble, and two fumble recoveries, earning first team All-Big Sky honors for the second consecutive season.

Perryman transferred to play for the Washington in 2022. He suffered a series of injuries during the season. He strained his quadricep in the season opener, which caused him to miss the next two games and continued to bother him for another four games. He missed another game later in the season due to a dislocated shoulder. Then in the season finale, Perryman broke his thumb. Overall, he played in 10 games, all starts, totaling 37 tackles and one pass breakup.

== Professional career ==
Pre-draft measurables
Height	Weight	Arm length	Hand span	40-yard dash	10-yard split	20-yard split	20-yard shuttle	Three-cone drill	Vertical jump	Broad jump
5 ft 11 1/2 in (1.82 m)	198 lb (90 kg)	32 in (0.81 m)	9 5/8 in (0.24 m)	4.54 s	1.62 s	2.58 s	4.26 s	6.82 s	37.5 in (0.95 m)	10 ft 6 in (3.20 m)
All values from Pro Day

=== Las Vegas Raiders ===
Perryman signed with the Las Vegas Raiders of the National Football League (NFL) on May 12, 2023 after going undrafted in the 2023 NFL draft. He was waived/injured on July 27, and reverted to injured reserve the next day. He was waived from injured reserve on September 5, 2023.

=== BC Lions ===
Perryman was signed by the BC Lions of the Canadian Football League (CFL) on February 26, 2024. He played in ten regular season games where he posted seven defensive tackles, six special teams tackles, and one forced fumble. He was with the team in training camp in 2025, but was part of the final cuts on June 1, 2025.

=== Ottawa Redblacks ===
On May 10, 2026, Perryman signed with the Ottawa Redblacks. He was released on May 25.
