= Zumwalt Park (Tulare) =

Park in Tulare, California, United States

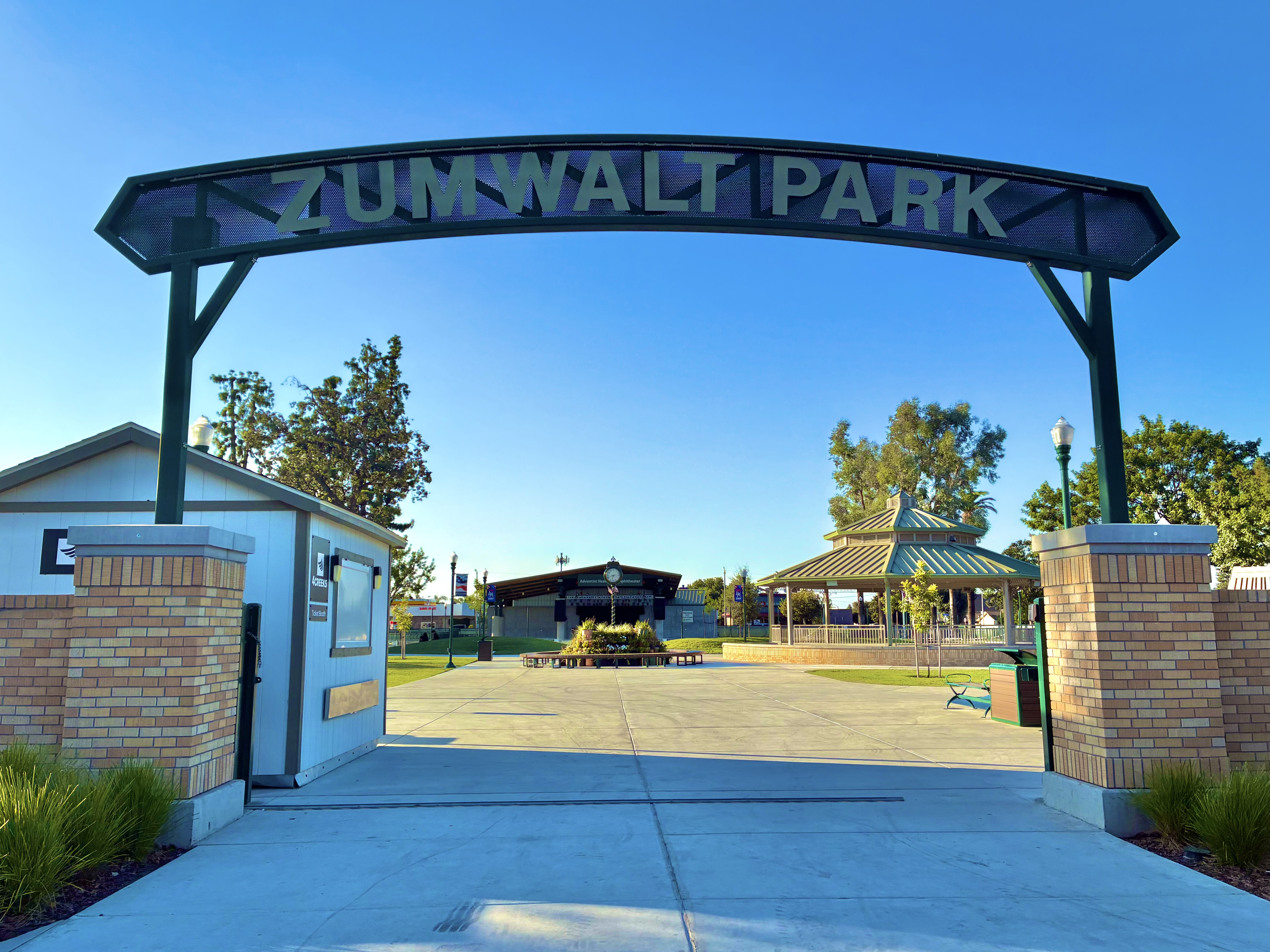
- Park main entrance
- Interactive map of Zumwalt Park
- Type: Public park
- Location: 455 E. Tulare AvenueTulare, California, California
- Coordinates: 36°12′28.41″N 119°20′33.56″W
- Operator: Tulare
- Status: Open
- Facilities: Amphitheater; splash pad; play structures; restrooms; gazebo; green space; lighted walking paths

Zumwalt Park is a public park in Tulare, California, located near downtown.

== History ==
The site originally operated as a fair ground and pavilio . Over time, the park became one of the city's primary public gathering spaces for recreation and community events.

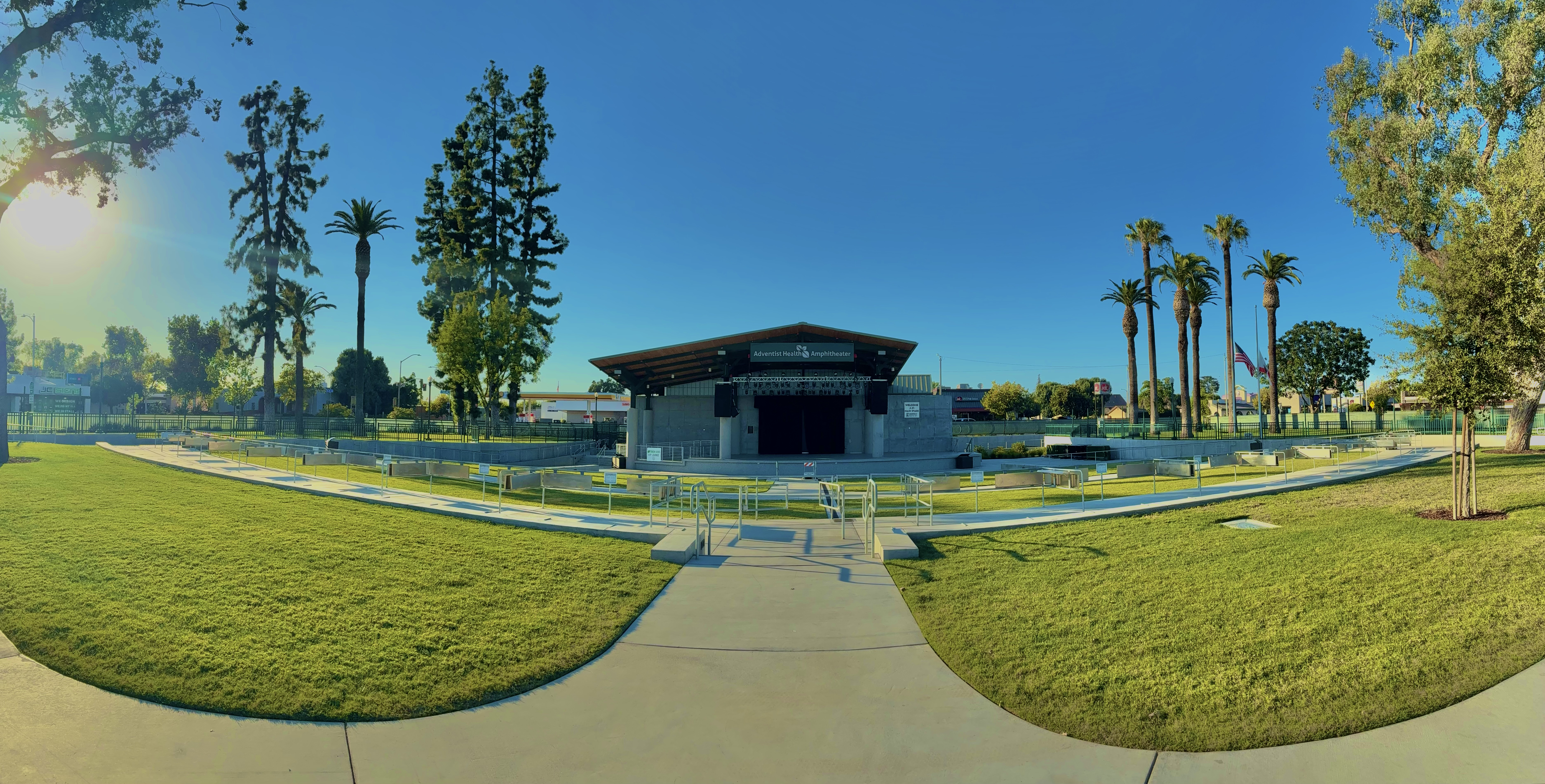
The amphitheater from the May 2025 renovation.

Beginning in the early 2020s, Tulare started modernizing the aging park. Improvements included new playground equipment, upgraded walking paths, expanded landscaping, improved lighting, picnic facilities, accessibility enhancements, a splash pad, and a new amphitheater. The renovated park officially reopened in May 2025.

Around March 2026, the park received the California Park & Recreation Society’s 2025 Award of Excellence in Park Planning in recognition of its recent redevelopment.

== See also ==
- List of parks in Tulare, California
