= Mefford Field Airport =

Airport in Tulare County, California

Mefford Field Tulare Airport
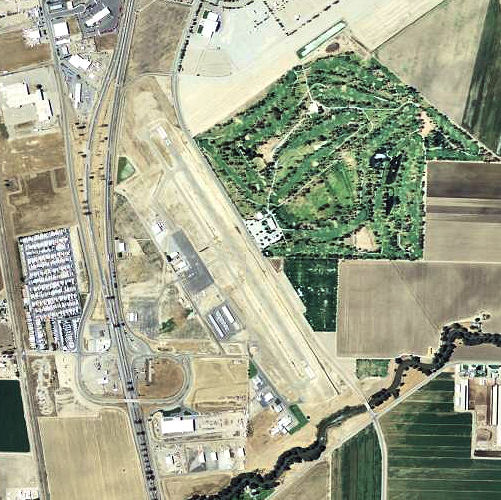
- USGS 2006 orthophoto
- IATA: TLR; ICAO: KTLR; FAA LID: TLR

Summary
- Airport type: Public
- Owner: City of Tulare
- Serves: Tulare, California
- Elevation AMSL: 265 ft / 81 m
- Coordinates: 36°09′24″N 119°19′36″W

Map
- Location of airport in California

Runways
Direction	Length		Surface
Direction	ft	m	Surface
13/31	3,901	1,189	Asphalt

Statistics (2011)
- Aircraft operations: 26,180
- Based aircraft: 48
- Source: Federal Aviation Administration

Mefford Field (IATA: TLR, ICAO: KTLR, FAA LID: TLR) is a public use airport in Tulare County, California, United States. It is owned by the City of Tulare and located three nautical miles (6 km) southeast of its central business district. This airport is included in the National Plan of Integrated Airport Systems for 2011–2015, which categorized it as a general aviation facility.

== History ==
Mefford Field, a civilian airfield located in Tulare, CA, served as the temporary site for the Rankin Aeronautical Academy, a flight school to teach United States Army Air Corps flight cadets.

Rankin Field was established by Tex Rankin in 1940 when he signed a contract with the War Department to open a school to train United States Army Air Corps flight cadets. The "Rankin Aeronautical Academy, Inc." was established and in February 1941, the school began basic (level 1) pilot training at Mefford Field, located about six miles west of the still under-construction Rankin Field. Classes were moved to Rankin Field in May 1941.

Rankin Field became one of the 62 civilian-owned flying schools in the U.S. that taught 1.4 million World War II Army pilots to fly. It was assigned to the West Coast Training Center (later Western Flying Training Command). Its primary training aircraft was the PT-17 Stearman, of which over 200 were assigned.

As Rankin Academy moved to its permanent site, Mefford Field returned to daily operations as a civilian airfield, which it continues to do to this day.

== Facilities and aircraft ==
Mefford Field covers an area of 206 acres (83 ha) at an elevation of 265 feet (81 m) above mean sea level. It has one runway designated 13/31 with an asphalt surface measuring 3,901 by 75 feet (1,189 x 23 m).

For the 12-month period ending April 5, 2011, the airport had 26,180 general aviation aircraft operations, an average of 71 per day. At that time, there were 48 aircraft based at this airport: 88% single-engine, 6% helicopter, 4% multi-engine, and 2% glider.

== See also ==
- California World War II Army Airfields
- List of airports in California

== Other sources ==
- Manning, Thomas A. (2005), History of Air Education and Training Command, 1942–2002. Office of History and Research, Headquarters, AETC, Randolph AFB, Texas OCLC 71006954, 29991467
- Shaw, Frederick J. (2004), Locating Air Force Base Sites, History’s Legacy, Air Force History and Museums Program, United States Air Force, Washington DC. OCLC 57007862, 1050653629
