= Never Ending Tour 1999 =

1999 concert tour by Bob Dylan

- Tour by Bob Dylan
- Poster to the concert in Las Vegas, USA
- Start date: January 26, 1999
- End date: November 20, 1999
- Legs: 5
- No. of shows: 96 in North America; 21 in Europe; 117 in Total

Bob Dylan concert chronology
- Never Ending Tour 1998 (1998); Never Ending Tour 1999 (1999); Never Ending Tour 2000 (2000)

The Never Ending Tour is the popular name for Bob Dylan's endless touring schedule since June 7, 1988.

== Background information ==
The Never Ending Tour 1999 started in Fort Myers, Florida. This was the first time that Dylan had performed in Florida since 1995. The rest of the tour focused mainly the eastern United States except the final two concerts of the tour which took place in Paradise, Nevada.

Dylan travelled to Europe after finishing the North American leg. Dylan started the tour with two concerts in Portugal followed by eleven concerts in Spain. Dylan also performed three concerts in Austria.

After completing the European summer tour Dylan returned to the United States to perform a thirty-eight date tour with Paul Simon. During the tour he performed as part of the Summerfest summer festival in Milwaukee, Wisconsin, and also performed a show without Paul Simon at the Tramps Nightclub. The first leg of this two-part tour came to a close in Wantagh, New York, on July 31. The tour picked up again at West Palm Beach, Florida, on September 2 and travelled throughout the southern states coming to a close on September 18 in Dallas, Texas.

On October 26 Dylan started a twenty date tour with Phil Lesh and Friends. The tour came to a close in Newark, Delaware, on November 20.

== Tour dates ==
| Date | City | Country | Venue | Opening Act(s) | Attendance | Box Office |
North America
| January 26, 1999 | Estero | United States | Everblades Arena | The Brian Setzer Orchestra | —N/a | —N/a |
| January 28, 1999 | Sunrise | United States | National Car Rental Center | The Brian Setzer Orchestra | —N/a | —N/a |
| January 29, 1999 | Daytona Beach | United States | Ocean Center | The Brian Setzer Orchestra | —N/a | —N/a |
| January 30, 1999 | Tampa | United States | Ice Palace | The Brian Setzer Orchestra | —N/a | —N/a |
| February 1, 1999 | Tallahassee | United States | Tallahassee-Leon County Civic Center | The Brian Setzer Orchestra | —N/a | —N/a |
| February 2, 1999 | Pensacola | United States | Pensacola Civic Center | The Brian Setzer Orchestra | —N/a | —N/a |
| February 3, 1999 | New Orleans | United States | Lakefront Arena | The Brian Setzer Orchestra | —N/a | —N/a |
| February 5, 1999 | Memphis | United States | New Daisy Theater | —N/a | —N/a | —N/a |
| February 6, 1999 | Nashville | United States | Nashville Municipal Auditorium | The Brian Setzer Orchestra | —N/a | —N/a |
| February 7, 1999 | Birmingham | United States | Boutwell Memorial Auditorium | The Brian Setzer Orchestra | —N/a | —N/a |
| February 9, 1999 | Dayton | United States | Nutter Center | The Brian Setzer Orchestra | —N/a | —N/a |
| February 10, 1999 | Columbus | United States | Value City Arena | The Brian Setzer Orchestra | —N/a | —N/a |
| February 12, 1999 | Carbondale | United States | SIU Arena | The Brian Setzer Orchestra | —N/a | —N/a |
| February 13, 1999 | Normal | United States | Redbird Arena | The Brian Setzer Orchestra | —N/a | —N/a |
| February 14, 1999 | Notre Dame | United States | Edmund P. Joyce Center | The Brian Setzer Orchestra | —N/a | —N/a |
| February 15, 1999 | Grand Rapids | United States | Van Andel Arena | The Brian Setzer Orchestra | —N/a | —N/a |
| February 17, 1999 | Cleveland | United States | CSU Convocation Center | Natalie Merchant | —N/a | —N/a |
| February 18, 1999 | Bethlehem | United States | Stabler Arena | Natalie Merchant | —N/a | —N/a |
| February 19, 1999 | Binghamton | United States | Broome County Veterans Memorial Arena | Natalie Merchant | —N/a | —N/a |
| February 20, 1999 | Lake Placid | United States | Lake Placid Olympic Sports Complex | Natalie Merchant | 6,363 / 7,066 | $210,945 |
| February 22, 1999 | Troy | United States | Houston Field House | Natalie Merchant | —N/a | —N/a |
| February 23, 1999 | Buffalo | United States | Marine Midland Arena | Natalie Merchant | —N/a | —N/a |
| February 24, 1999 | Amherst | United States | Mullins Center | Natalie Merchant | —N/a | —N/a |
| February 25, 1999 | Portland | United States | Cumberland County Civic Center | Natalie Merchant | —N/a | —N/a |
| February 27, 1999 (Note: Two shows. One at 7:30pm and 10:30pm.) | Atlantic City | United States | Copa Room | —N/a | —N/a | —N/a |
| March 1, 1999 | Paradise | United States | House of Blues | —N/a | —N/a | —N/a |
| March 2, 1999 | Paradise | United States | House of Blues | —N/a | —N/a | —N/a |
Europe
| April 7, 1999 | Lisbon | Portugal | Pavilhão Atlântico | —N/a | —N/a | —N/a |
| April 8, 1999 | Porto | Portugal | Coliseu do Porto | —N/a | —N/a | —N/a |
| April 9, 1999 | Santiago de Compostela | Spain | Pavillón Multiusos Fontes do Sar | Andrés Calamaro | —N/a | —N/a |
| April 10, 1999 | Gijón | Spain | Teatro Jovellanos | —N/a | —N/a | —N/a |
| April 11, 1999 | San Sebastián | Spain | Velódromo de Anoeta | Andrés Calamaro | —N/a | —N/a |
| April 13, 1999 | Santander | Spain | Sala Ataulfo Argenta | —N/a | —N/a | —N/a |
| April 14, 1999 | Madrid | Spain | Palacio de Deportes de la Comunidad | Andrés Calamaro | —N/a | —N/a |
| April 15, 1999 | Valencia | Spain | Luis Puig Palace | Andrés Calamaro | —N/a | —N/a |
| April 17, 1999 | Málaga | Spain | Plaza de toros de La Malagueta | Andrés Calamaro | —N/a | —N/a |
| April 18, 1999 | Granada | Spain | Palacio Municipal de Deportes de Granada | Andrés Calamaro | —N/a | —N/a |
| April 19, 1999 | Murcia | Spain | Auditorio y Víctor Villegas | —N/a | —N/a | —N/a |
| April 21, 1999 | Zaragoza | Spain | Príncipe Felipe Arena | Andrés Calamaro | —N/a | —N/a |
| April 22, 1999 | Barcelona | Spain | Palau dels Esports de Barcelona | Andrés Calamaro | —N/a | —N/a |
| April 23, 1999 | Marseille | France | Le Dôme de Marseille | —N/a | —N/a | —N/a |
| April 25, 1999 | Zurich | Switzerland | Hallenstadion | —N/a | —N/a | —N/a |
| April 27, 1999 | Linz | Austria | Linzer Sporthalle | —N/a | —N/a | —N/a |
| April 28, 1999 | Ljubljana | Slovenia | Tivoli Hall | —N/a | —N/a | —N/a |
| April 29, 1999 | Graz | Austria | Eisstadion Liebenau | —N/a | —N/a | —N/a |
| April 30, 1999 | Vienna | Austria | Wiener Stadthalle | —N/a | —N/a | —N/a |
| May 1, 1999 (Note: The May 1, 1999 concert in Ischgl was part of the Top of the Mountain Concert.) | Ischgl | Austria | Silvretta Ski And Funsport Arena | —N/a | —N/a | —N/a |
| May 2, 1999 (Note: The May 2, 1999 concert in Munich was originally scheduled to take place on May 1, 1999.) | Munich | Germany | Olympiahalle | —N/a | —N/a | —N/a |
North America (Co-Headlining Tour with Paul Simon)
| June 5, 1999 (Note: Show without Paul Simon.) | Denver | United States | Fillmore Auditorium | —N/a | —N/a | —N/a |
| June 6, 1999 | Colorado Springs | United States | World Arena | —N/a | —N/a | —N/a |
| June 7, 1999 | Denver | United States | McNichols Sports Arena | —N/a | —N/a | —N/a |
| June 9, 1999 | Salt Lake City | United States | Delta Center | —N/a | —N/a | —N/a |
| June 11, 1999 | Vancouver | Canada | General Motors Arena | —N/a | —N/a | —N/a |
| June 12, 1999 | Portland | United States | Rose Garden | —N/a | —N/a | —N/a |
| June 13, 1999 | George | United States | The Gorge Amphitheatre | —N/a | 16,336 / 20,000 | $839,985 |
| June 14, 1999 | Eugene | United States | Erb Memorial Union Ballroom | —N/a | —N/a | —N/a |
| June 16, 1999 | Sacramento | United States | ARCO Arena | —N/a | —N/a | —N/a |
| June 18, 1999 | Concord | United States | Concord Pavilion | —N/a | 10,299 / 12,500 | $719,737 |
| June 19, 1999 | Mountain View | United States | Shoreline Amphitheatre | —N/a | —N/a | —N/a |
| June 20, 1999 | Anaheim | United States | Arrowhead Pond | —N/a | —N/a | —N/a |
| June 22, 1999 | Los Angeles | United States | Hollywood Bowl | —N/a | 16,785 / 16,785 | $1,010,135 |
| June 25, 1999 | Chula Vista | United States | Cricket Wireless Amphitheatre | —N/a | 9,037 / 19,442 | $480,652 |
| June 26, 1999 | Paradise | United States | MGM Grand Garden Arena | —N/a | —N/a | —N/a |
| June 27, 1999 | Phoenix | United States | Desert Sky Pavilion | —N/a | —N/a | —N/a |
| July 2, 1999 | Shakopee | United States | Canterbury Park | BoDeans | 15,940 / 15,940 | $677,450 |
| July 3, 1999 | Duluth | United States | Bayfront Festival Park | BoDeans | 16,205 / 18,000 | $648,200 |
| July 4, 1999 (Note: The July 4, 1999 concert in Milwaukee was part of Summerfest.) | Milwaukee | United States | Marcus Amphitheater | —N/a | —N/a | —N/a |
| July 6, 1999 | Detroit | United States | Saint Andrew's Hall | —N/a | —N/a | —N/a |
| July 7, 1999 | Clarkston | United States | Pine Knob Music Theatre | —N/a | —N/a | —N/a |
| July 9, 1999 | Tinley Park | United States | World Music Theatre | BoDeans | 18,024 / 25,000 | $847,720 |
| July 10, 1999 | Maryland Heights | United States | Riverport Amphitheatre | —N/a | —N/a | —N/a |
| July 11, 1999 | Cincinnati | United States | Bogart's | —N/a | 1,464 / 1,464 | $36,966 |
| July 13, 1999 | Virginia Beach | United States | GTE Virginia Beach Amphitheater | —N/a | —N/a | —N/a |
| July 14, 1999 | Raleigh | United States | Alltel Pavilion | —N/a | —N/a | —N/a |
| July 16, 1999 | Bristow | United States | Nissan Pavilion at Stone Ridge | —N/a | 19,457 / 22,549 | $874,235 |
| July 17, 1999 | Camden | United States | Blockbuster-Sony Music Centre | —N/a | —N/a | —N/a |
| July 18, 1999 | Burgettstown | United States | First Niagara Pavilion | —N/a | 17,469 / 23,152 | $679,403 |
| July 20, 1999 | Albany | United States | Pepsi Arena | —N/a | —N/a | —N/a |
| July 22, 1999 | Mansfield | United States | Comcast Center | —N/a | —N/a | —N/a |
| July 23, 1999 | Mansfield | United States | Comcast Center | —N/a | —N/a | —N/a |
| July 24, 1999 | Hartford | United States | Meadows Music Theater | —N/a | 15,094 / 25,000 | $632,900 |
| July 26, 1999 | New York City | United States | Tramps Nightclub | —N/a | —N/a | —N/a |
| July 27, 1999 | New York City | United States | Madison Square Garden | —N/a | 17,161 / 17,161 | $1,347,123 |
| July 28, 1999 | Holmdel | United States | PNC Bank Arts Center | —N/a | 16,476 / 17,076 | $1,007,500 |
| July 30, 1999 | Wantagh | United States | Jones Beach Amphitheater | —N/a | 26,924 / 28,220 | $2,117,320 |
| July 31, 1999 | Wantagh | United States | Jones Beach Amphitheater | —N/a | 26,924 / 28,220 | $2,117,320 |
| September 2, 1999 | West Palm Beach | United States | Coral Sky Amphitheatre | —N/a | —N/a | —N/a |
| September 4, 1999 | Atlanta | United States | Chastain Park Amphitheater | —N/a | —N/a | —N/a |
| September 5, 1999 | Charlotte | United States | Blockbuster Pavilion | —N/a | —N/a | —N/a |
| September 8, 1999 | Antioch | United States | First American Music Center | —N/a | —N/a | —N/a |
| September 9, 1999 | Noblesville | United States | Deer Creek Music Center | —N/a | —N/a | —N/a |
| September 11, 1999 | Memphis | United States | Memphis Pyramid | —N/a | —N/a | —N/a |
| September 12, 1999 | Lafayette | United States | Cajundome | —N/a | —N/a | —N/a |
| September 15, 1999 | Austin | United States | Frank Erwin Center | —N/a | 10,947 / 10,947 | $485,935 |
| September 17, 1999 | The Woodlands | United States | Cynthia Woods Mitchell Pavilion | —N/a | —N/a | —N/a |
| September 18, 1999 | Dallas | United States | Starplex Amphitheater | —N/a | —N/a | —N/a |
North America (Co-Headlining Tour with Phil Lesh and Friends)
| October 26, 1999 (Note: Show without Phil Lesh and Friends.) | Chicago | United States | Park West | —N/a | —N/a | —N/a |
| October 27, 1999 | Champaign | United States | Assembly Hall | —N/a | —N/a | —N/a |
| October 29, 1999 | Oxford | United States | Millett Hall | —N/a | —N/a | —N/a |
| October 30, 1999 | Milwaukee | United States | Milwaukee Arena | —N/a | —N/a | —N/a |
| October 31, 1999 | Chicago | United States | UIC Pavilion | —N/a | —N/a | —N/a |
| November 2, 1999 | East Lansing | United States | Breslin Student Events Center | —N/a | —N/a | —N/a |
| November 3, 1999 | Columbus | United States | Value City Arena | —N/a | —N/a | —N/a |
| November 5, 1999 | Pittsburgh | United States | Civic Arena | —N/a | —N/a | —N/a |
| November 6, 1999 | University Park | United States | Bryce Jordan Center | —N/a | —N/a | —N/a |
| November 8, 1999 | Baltimore | United States | Baltimore Arena | —N/a | —N/a | —N/a |
| November 9, 1999 | Philadelphia | United States | The Apollo of Temple | —N/a | —N/a | —N/a |
| November 10, 1999 | New Haven | United States | New Haven Coliseum | —N/a | —N/a | —N/a |
| November 11, 1999 | Augusta | United States | Augusta Civic Center | —N/a | —N/a | —N/a |
| November 13, 1999 | East Rutherford | United States | Continental Airlines Arena | —N/a | 18,155 / 18,155 | $511,737 |
| November 14, 1999 | Worcester | United States | Worcester's Centrum Centre | —N/a | —N/a | —N/a |
| November 15, 1999 | Ithaca | United States | Barton Hall | —N/a | —N/a | —N/a |
| November 17, 1999 | Durham | United States | Whittemore Center | —N/a | —N/a | —N/a |
| November 18, 1999 | Amherst | United States | Mullins Center | —N/a | —N/a | —N/a |
| November 19, 1999 (Note: Two shows. One at 8pm and 11pm.) | Atlantic City | United States | Copa Room | —N/a | —N/a | —N/a |
| November 20, 1999 | Newark | United States | Bob Carpenter Center | —N/a | —N/a | —N/a |
| TOTAL | | | | | 252,136 / 298,457 (84%) | $13,128,033 (2020: $20,394,286) |
