= Mission Oak High School =

Location
- 3442 East Bardsley Avenue; Tulare, California 93274; United States; 36°11′49″N 119°17′54″W

Information
- Established: 2008
- School district: Tulare Joint Union High School
- CEEB code: 054248
- NCES School ID: 063993012084
- Principal: Isidro Carrasco
- Teaching staff: 81.22 (FTE)
- Enrollment: 1,741 (2023-2024)
- Student to teacher ratio: 21.44
- Colors: Purple, Black,
- Mascot: "Mo" the Hawk
- Nickname: Hawks
- Rivals: Tulare Union High School; Tulare Western High School
- Website: mohs.tjuhsd.org

Mission Oak High School is a public high school in Tulare, California. Along with Tulare Union High School and Tulare Western High School, it is part of the Tulare Joint Union High School District.

== History ==
Mission Oak opened in August 2008. The school began teaching only freshmen and sophomores, later adding junior and seniors. Mission Oak is Tulare's newest addition (high school) to the district since Tulare Western opened in 1959. Its first senior class was in 2011. Enrollment is approximately 1,675.

Isidro Carrasco was the school's first principal, and after a five-year absence, returned to the school as principal in July 2020. School colors are purple, black and white, and its athletic teams are nicknamed the Hawks and compete in the six-team West Yosemite League. The school's mascots are Mo (male) & Mo'Nique (female) Hawks. The school has won 7 CIF Valley Titles (2015 CIF Central Section Division IV Girls' Basketball Championship, 2015 CIF Central Section Division IV Girls' Softball Championship, 2016 CIF Central Section Division III Girls' Basketball Championship, 2016 CIF Central Section Division IV Girls' Softball Championship, 2019 CIF Central Section Division III Girls' Soccer, 2019 CIF Central Section Division VI Tennis Championship, 2023 CIF Central Section Division III Football Championship.)
