= Tulare Union High School =

Location
- 755 East Tulare Avenue; Tulare, California 93274; United States

Information
- Established: 1890
- School district: Tulare Joint Union High School
- NCES District ID: 063993006619
- Principal: Michelle Nunley
- Teaching staff: 76.44 (FTE)
- Enrollment: 1,622 (2023–2024)
- Student to teacher ratio: 21.22
- Colors: Cardinal and gold
- Mascot: Tribe
- Rivals: Tulare Western; Mission Oak
- Website: tuhs.tjuhsd.org
- Tulare Union High School Auditorium and Administration Building
- U.S. National Register of Historic Places
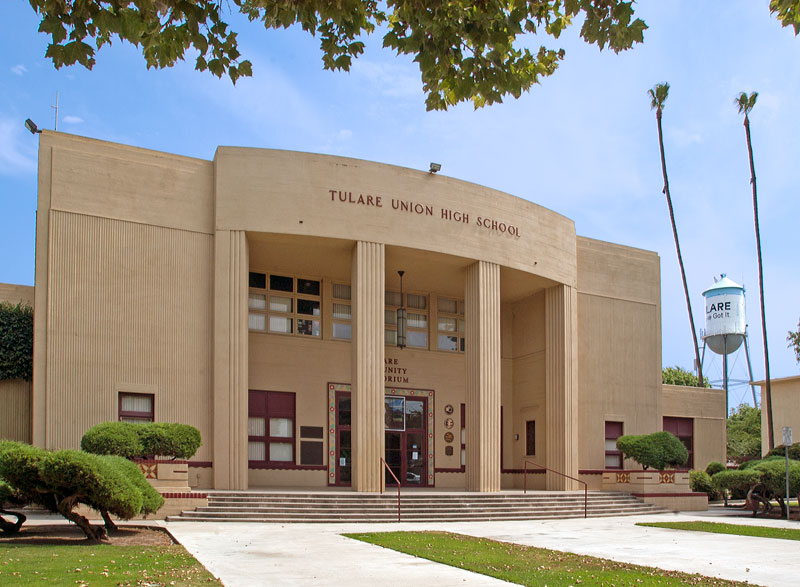

- Location within California Location within the United States
- Location: 755 E. Tulare Ave., Tulare, California
- Coordinates: 36°12′32″N 119°20′17″W
- Area: less than one acre
- Built: 1937
- Architect: Coates, W.D.; Ochs, W.J.
- Architectural style: Moderne
- NRHP reference No.: 99001566
- Added to NRHP: December 17, 1999

Tulare Union High School (/tʊˈlɛəri/) is a public school for secondary education in Tulare, Tulare County, California, United States. This high school is part of the Tulare Joint Union High School District, along with Tulare Western High School and Mission Oak High School, led by Superintendent Tony Rodriguez. Enrollment at the four-year high school is approximately 1,650 for the current school year.

The Administration Building and the school's Tulare Community Auditorium are listed in the National Register of Historic Places.

== History ==
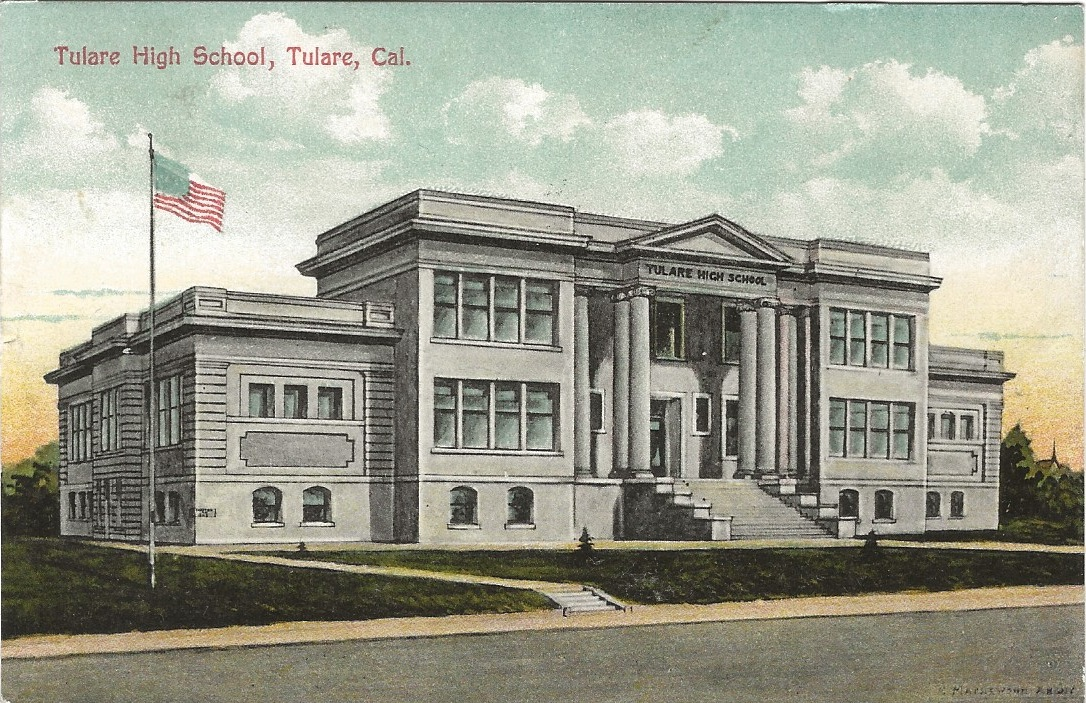
1910 Post Card of the Tulare High School, Tulare, California.

The original Tulare school was established in 1873 in a two-room school building. On May 4, 1884, a new two-story brick building was built with nine classrooms and offices on the site of the first building. It was located on 400 block of West Tulare Avenue about where Mt. Whitney High School is now located. In 1890, the school district decided to use the second story for high school students. In June 1893, the high school had its first graduation class of eleven students. In 1908, the high school moved into a new building constructed on property owned by D. W. Madden. The school reopened for students in 1909. This was a three-story brick building with an auditorium that seated 600 students.

On March 10, 1933, an earthquake damaged the high school. Plans for a new building were finalized in November 1935. A new administration building was dedicated on May 30, 1937, with the first commencement of the Tulare High School class of 1937 on June 1, 1937.

== Facilities ==
The school has grown steadily since the 1980s with expanding local land development and corresponding general population. In 1989 the Tulare Joint Union High School District retained the firm of Earth Metrics to forecast district growth and analyze the facility needs of the system in future years. In the 1980s the California Legislature changed the rules governing school facilities financing by authorizing school districts to directly levy School Impact Fees (sometimes called "Developer Fees"), and by deeming the School Facilities Act the exclusive means by which cities and counties can address the overcrowding of schools. Thus at that time the district forecast the future enrollment and established appropriate development fees to finance forecast facilities needs to expand Tulare Union High School and other district facilities.

== Athletics ==
The school's athletic teams compete in the six-team West Yosemite League under the name Tribe.

Tulare Union is one of few U.S. high schools to have graduated multiple Olympic gold medal winners. Decathlete Bob Mathias won gold in 1948 and 1952, and discus thrower Sim Iness won in 1952. Mathias and Iness were classmates who graduated the same year. Sadly, both of these Olympic athletes have now passed away. The school's stadium was named after Mathias in 1977, and a gymnasium was named after Iness in 1994.

From 1924 until 2016, the school's athletic nickname was the Redskins. The term "redskin" is widely defined by dictionaries as pejorative, and the California State Assembly banned use of the mascot by public schools in September 2015. Principal Nunley defended the term, saying that the school had no history of racism and that the mascot honored natives. State Senator Marty Block described that as a rationalization, and said the term is a racist slur which warrants state intervention. The school had until 2017 to switch, and the district voted in June 2016 to change the name to Tribe. The move was part of a wider controversy over the use of Native American imagery as mascots.

== Noted graduates ==
- Kazmeir Allen, NFL wide receiver and return specialist for the Washington Commanders
- Ryan Benjamin - American player of gridiron football
- Matt Crafton - Three-time champion of the NASCAR Camping World Truck Series
- Marquess Wilson - NFL Wide Receiver for the Chicago Bears
- Bryce Harris - NFL Offensive Tackle for the Atlanta Falcons
- Bryan Allen, pedal-powered aircraft pilot
- Max Choboian, Former NFL quarterback for the Denver Broncos
- Zac Diles, NFL linebacker currently a free agent
- Dominique Dorsey, Former NFL and Canadian Football League player
- Freddie Ford, Former NFL player
- Virgil Green, NFL tight end for the Denver Broncos
- Sim Iness, Olympic discus gold medalist, 1952
- Vic Lombardi, Former MLB pitcher for the Brooklyn Dodgers/Pittsburgh Pirates
- Bob Mathias, Olympic decathlon gold medalist (1948 & 1952) and former U.S. Congressman
- Devin Nunes, Republican Party (United States), United States House of Representatives, California's 21st congressional district
- Maurice Preston, Four star General, U.S. Air Force
- Elmo Zumwalt, Admiral, U.S. Navy
