= Tagus Ranch =

Coordinates: 36°16′26″N 119°21′57″W

Tagus Ranch is an abandoned restaurant, hotel, and 7,000 acre orchard, Founded by Hulett C. Merritt in 1912, and left in the mid 80's. Tagus Ranch was a popular venue, where many country musicians performed. Tagus Ranch is located less than 3 miles north of Tulare, California, off of Highway 99. Tagus Ranch was a German prisoner of war camp during World War II.
