= Never Ending Tour 2002 =

2002 concert tour by Bob Dylan

- Tour by Bob Dylan
- Poster to the concert in Brussels, Belgium
- Start date: January 31, 2002
- End date: November 22, 2002
- Legs: 3
- No. of shows: 78 in North America; 29 in Europe; 107 in Total

Bob Dylan concert chronology
- Never Ending Tour 2001 (2001); Never Ending Tour 2002 (2002); Never Ending Tour 2003 (2003)

The Never Ending Tour is the popular name for Bob Dylan's endless touring schedule since June 7, 1988.

== Tour ==
The Never Ending Tour 2002 started in Florida, where Dylan had not performed since September 1999. The tour continued through the southern United States.

The tour then moved on to Europe where Dylan played twenty seven cities in twelve countries including nine concerts in Germany and seven in England.

After performing Europe Dylan returned to North America performing in Canada and the United States. During this leg of the tour Dylan returned to the Newport Folk Festival. This was the first time he performed at the festival since the controversial performance there in July 1965.

After completing his US summer tour, Dylan performed a round tour of the United States starting in Seattle, Washington, on October 4 and coming to an end in Fairfax, Virginia, on November 22. It was after this last performance that Charlie Sexton left Bob Dylan's band. He returned to Dylan's band line-up in Summer 2009.

== Tour dates ==
Date	City	Country	Venue
North America (First Leg)
January 31, 2002	Orlando	United States	TD Waterhouse Centre
February 1, 2002	Sunrise	United States	National Car Rental Center
February 2, 2002	Tampa	United States	St. Pete Times Forum
February 5, 2002	Jacksonville	United States	Jacksonville Memorial Coliseum
February 6, 2002	North Charleston	United States	North Charleston Coliseum
February 8, 2002	Winston-Salem	United States	Lawrence Joel Veterans Memorial Coliseum
February 9, 2002	Atlanta	United States	Philips Arena
February 10, 2002	Charlotte	United States	Cricket Arena
February 11, 2002	Charleston	United States	Charleston Civic Center
February 13, 2002	Greenville	United States	BI-LO Center
February 15, 2002	Augusta	United States	James Brown Arena
February 16, 2002	Birmingham	United States	Birmingham–Jefferson Convention Complex
February 17, 2002	New Orleans	United States	Lakefront Arena
February 18, 2002	Tupelo	United States	BancorpSouth Center
February 20, 2002^{[A]}	Houston	United States	Reliant Astrodome
February 22, 2002	Dallas	United States	Reunion Arena
February 23, 2002	Bossier City	United States	CenturyTel Center
February 24, 2002	Austin	United States	Frank Erwin Center
Europe
April 5, 2002	Stockholm	Sweden	Globe Arena
April 7, 2002	Oslo	Norway	Oslo Spektrum
April 8, 2002	Copenhagen	Denmark	Forum Copenhagen
April 9, 2002	Hamburg	Germany	Alsterdorfer Sporthalle
April 11, 2002	Berlin	Germany	Treptow Arena
April 12, 2002	Leipzig	Germany	Gewandhaus
April 13, 2002	Hanover	Germany	TUI Arena
April 15, 2002	Frankfurt	Germany	Jahrhunderthalle
April 16, 2002	Stuttgart	Germany	Schleyerhalle
April 17, 2002	Munich	Germany	Olympiahalle
April 19, 2002	Ravenna	Italy	Palazzo Mauro de André
April 20, 2002	Milan	Italy	Mediolanum Forum
April 21, 2002	Zürich	Switzerland	Hallenstadion
April 23, 2002	Innsbruck	Austria	Messehalle
April 24, 2002	Nuremberg	Germany	Frankenhalle
April 25, 2002	Strasbourg	France	Rhénus Sport
April 27, 2002	Oberhausen	Germany	König Pilsener Arena
April 28, 2002	Brussels	Belgium	Forest National
April 29, 2002	Paris	France	Zénith de Paris
April 30, 2002	Paris	France	Zénith de Paris
May 2, 2002	Rotterdam	Netherlands	Rotterdam Ahoy
May 4, 2002	Brighton	England	Brighton Centre
May 5, 2002	Bournemouth	England	Bournemouth International Centre
May 6, 2002	Cardiff	Wales	Cardiff International Arena
May 8, 2002	Newcastle	England	Metro Radio Arena
May 9, 2002	Manchester	England	Manchester Evening News Arena
May 10, 2002	Birmingham	England	NEC LG Arena
May 11, 2002	London	England	London Arena
May 12, 2002	London	England	London Arena
North America (Second Leg)
August 2, 2002	Worcester	United States	Worcester Palladium
August 3, 2002^{[B]}	Newport	United States	Fort Adams State Park
August 4, 2002	Augusta	United States	Augusta Civic Center
August 6, 2002	Halifax	Canada	Halifax Metro Centre
August 8, 2002	Moncton	Canada	Moncton Coliseum
August 9, 2002	Saint John	Canada	Harbour Station
August 10, 2002	Quebec City	Canada	L'Agora du Vieux Port
August 12, 2002	Montreal	Canada	Molson Centre
August 13, 2002	Ottawa	Canada	Corel Centre
August 15, 2002	Hamburg	United States	Grand Stand
August 16, 2002	Toronto	Canada	Molson Amphitheatre
August 18, 2002^{[C]}	Baltimore	United States	Pimlico Race Course
August 19, 2002^{[D]}	Southampton	United States	Southampton College
August 21, 2002	Omaha	United States	Omaha Civic Auditorium
August 22, 2002	Sioux Falls	United States	Sioux Falls Stadium
August 23, 2002	Fargo	United States	Newman Outdoor Field
August 24, 2002	Winnipeg	Canada	Winnipeg Arena
August 26, 2002	Saskatoon	Canada	Saskatchewan Place
August 27, 2002	Edmonton	Canada	Skyreach Centre
August 28, 2002	Calgary	Canada	Pengrowth Saddledome
August 30, 2002	Park City	United States	Deer Valley Outdoor Amphitheatre
August 31, 2002	Grand Junction	United States	Mesa County Fairgrounds
September 1, 2002^{[E]}	Aspen	United States	Buttermilk Mountain
North America (Third Leg)
October 4, 2002	Seattle	United States	KeyArena
October 5, 2002	Eugene	United States	McArthur Court
October 7, 2002	Red Bluff	United States	Pauline Davis Pavilion
October 8, 2002	Sacramento	United States	Sacramento Convention Center Complex
October 9, 2002	Sacramento	United States	Sacramento Convention Center Complex
October 11, 2002	Berkeley	United States	Hearst Greek Theatre
October 12, 2002	Berkeley	United States	Hearst Greek Theatre
October 13, 2002^{[F]}	Stateline	United States	Harrah's Lake Tahoe
October 15, 2002	Los Angeles	United States	Wiltern Theatre
October 16, 2002	Los Angeles	United States	Wiltern Theatre
October 17, 2002	Los Angeles	United States	Wiltern Theatre
October 19, 2002	San Diego	United States	San Diego State University
October 20, 2002	Paradise	United States	The Joint
October 21, 2002^{[G]}	Phoenix	United States	Arizona Veterans Memorial Coliseum
October 23, 2002	Tucson	United States	Valencia Tori Amphitheater
October 25, 2002	Bernalillo	United States	Santa Ana Events Center
October 26, 2002	Denver	United States	Pepsi Center
October 28, 2002	Kansas City	United States	Uptown Theatre
October 29, 2002	Ames	United States	Hilton Coliseum
October 30, 2002	Saint Paul	United States	Xcel Energy Center
November 1, 2002	Rosemont	United States	Allstate Arena
November 2, 2002	Trotwood	United States	Hara Arena
November 3, 2002	Kent	United States	Memorial Athletic and Convocation Center
November 5, 2002^{[F]}	Indianapolis	United States	Murat Theater
November 7, 2002	Ann Arbor	United States	Crisler Arena
November 8, 2002	Pittsburgh	United States	AJ Palumbo Center
November 9, 2002	Elmira	United States	First Arena
November 11, 2002	New York City	United States	Madison Square Garden
November 13, 2002	New York City	United States	Madison Square Garden
November 15, 2002	Philadelphia	United States	First Union Center
November 16, 2002	Boston	United States	FleetCenter
November 17, 2002	Hartford	United States	XL Center
November 20, 2002	Kingston	United States	Ryan Center
November 21, 2002	Wilkes-Barre	United States	First Union Arena
November 22, 2002	Fairfax	United States	Patriot Center

Festivals and other miscellaneous performances

^{A} This concert was a part of "Houston Livestock Show and Rodeo".
^{B} This concert was a part of "Newport Folk Festival".
^{C} This concert was a part of "Harley-Davidson, 100th Anniversary".
^{D} This concert was a part of "All For The Sea Annual Benefit Concert".
^{E} This concert was a part of "Janus Jazz Festival".
^{F} Dylan performed two shows that evening.
^{G} This concert was a part of "Arizona State Fair".

=== Box office score data ===
Venue	City	Tickets sold / available	Gross revenue
The Palladium	Dallas, Texas	2,200 / 2,200 (100%)	$77,000
Uptown Theater	Kansas City, Missouri	2,200 / 2,200 (100%)	$99,000
Murat Shrine	Indianapolis, Indiana	3,798 / 4,000 (95%)	$123,435
Palumbo Center	Pittsburgh, Pennsylvania	4,406 / 4,406 (100%)	$154,210
TOTAL		12,604 / 12,806 (98%)	$453,645
