= Exeter Airport (California) =

Airport in California, United States

Exeter Airport Hunter Air Force Auxiliary Field
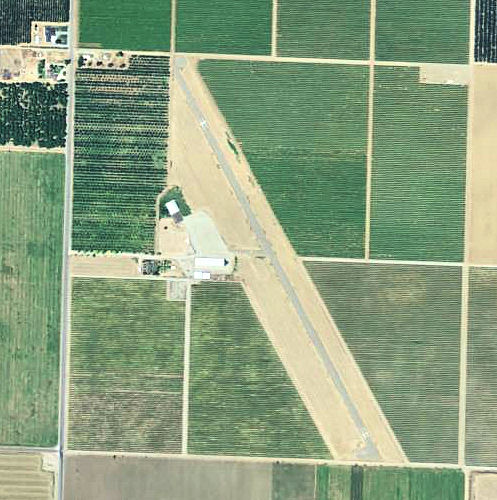
- 2006 USGS airphoto
- IATA: none; ICAO: none; FAA LID: CN63

Summary
- Airport type: Private
- Owner: James Costa
- Serves: Exeter, California
- Elevation AMSL: 340 ft (100 m)
- Coordinates: 36°14′33″N 119°08′59″W

Map
- Location of Exeter Airport

Runways
Direction	Length		Surface
Direction	ft	m	Surface
13/31	2,800	853	Asphalt/treated

Statistics (2019)
- Aircraft operations: 400
- Based aircraft: 3
- Source: Federal Aviation Administration

Exeter Airport (FAA LID: CN63) is a private airport located three nautical miles (6km) south of the central business district of Exeter, a city in Tulare County, California, United States.

== Facilities and aircraft ==
Exeter Airport covers an area of 26 acres (11 ha) at an elevation of 340 feet (104 m) above mean sea level. It has one runway designated 13/31 with an asphalt/treated surface measuring 2,800 by 40 feet (853 x 12 m).

=== Location ===
FAA Identifier:	CN63
Lat/Long:	36-14-32.9200N 119-08-57.9000W 36-14.548667N 119-08.965000W 36.2424778,-119.1494167 (estimated)
Elevation:	344 ft. / 105 m (estimated)
Variation:	15E (1985)
From city:	3 miles S of EXETER, CA
Time zone:	UTC -7 (UTC -8 during Standard Time)
Zip code:	93247

For the 12-month period ending June 3, 2019, the Exeter airport had 400 general aviation aircraft operations, an average of 33 per month. At that time, there were three single-engine aircraft based at this airport.

=== Airport Services ===
Parking:	tiedowns
Bottled oxygen:	NONE
Bulk oxygen:	NONE

== History ==
During World War II, the Exeter airport was designated as Hunter Auxiliary Field (A-1). It was used by the United States Army Air Forces as an auxiliary training airfield for the flying school at Rankin Field, California.

In 2019 Exeter Airport shifted from a publicly owned (FAA LID: O63) to privately owned (FAA LID: CN63) airfield.

== See also ==
- California World War II Army Airfields
