= Rankin Field =

Former US military airfield in Tulare County, California

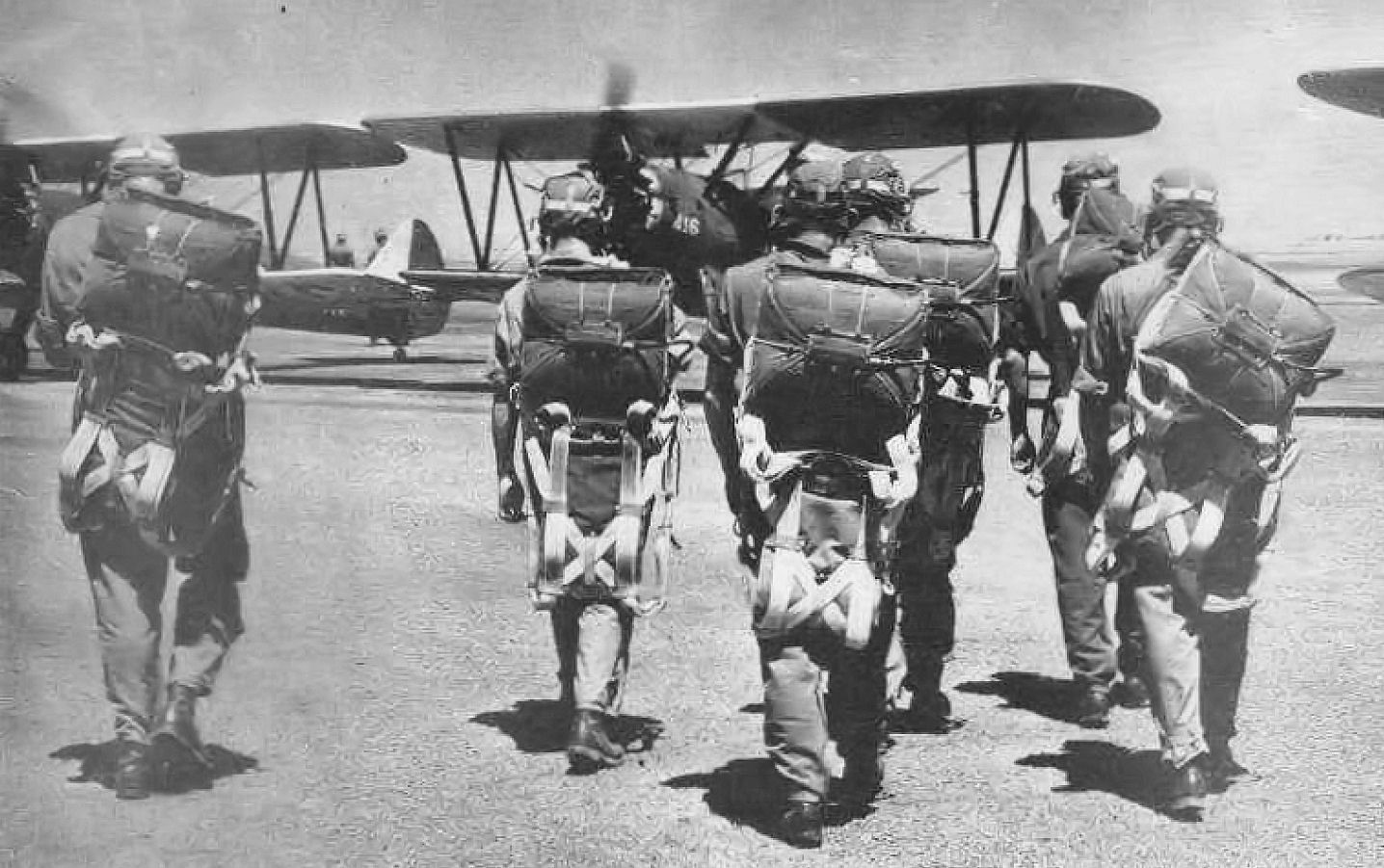
- 1943 USAAF photo of flight cadets at Rankin Field getting ready to train in their PT-17 Stearman biplanes
- IATA: none; ICAO: none

Summary
- Serves: Tulare, California
- Coordinates: 36°09′12″N 119°15′16″W

Map
- Location of Rankin Field

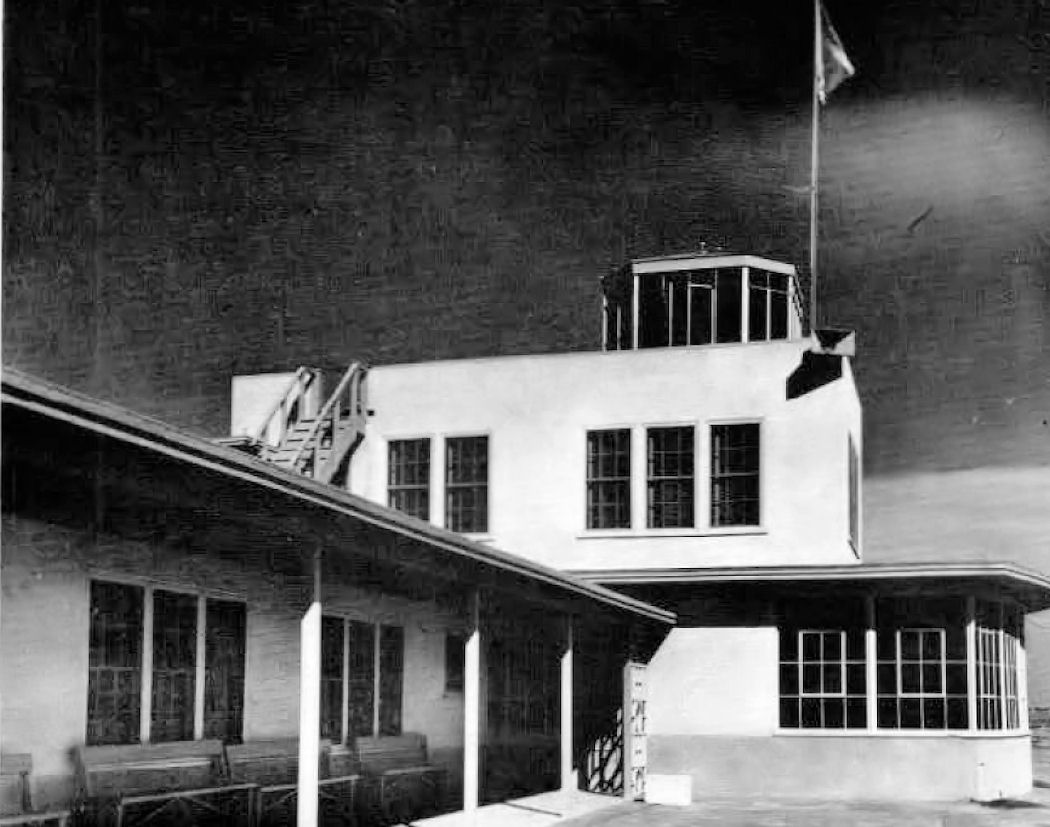
Operations Building and Control Tower, 1944

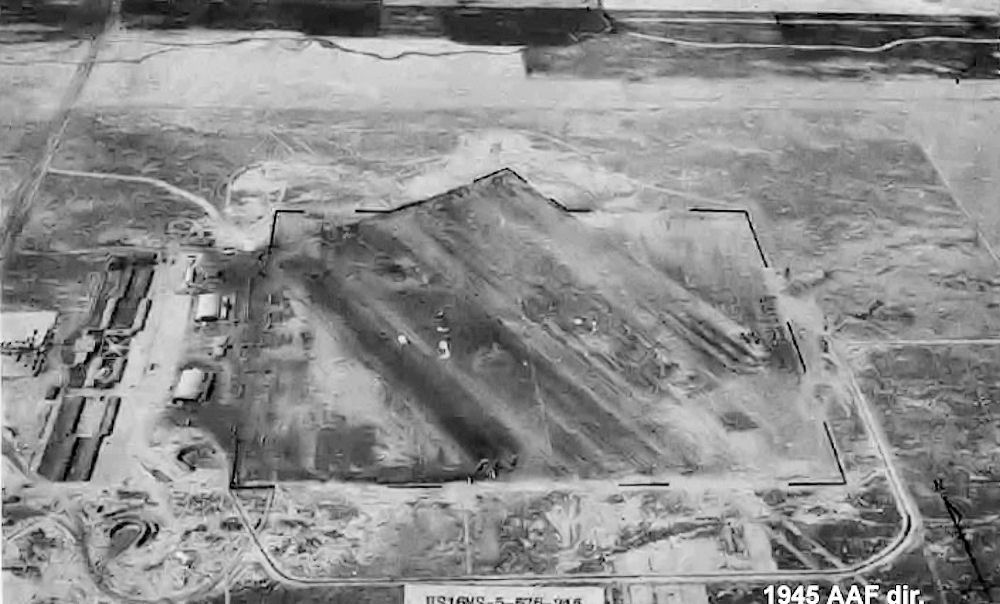
Photo of Rankin Field, 1945

Rankin Field is a former airport and military airfield located approximately 7 miles (11 km) southeast of Tulare, California. It was a United States Army Air Forces basic (Level 1) flying training facility during World War II. It is now an agricultural and light industrial site.

== History ==
Rankin Field was established by Tex Rankin in 1940 when he signed a contract with the War Department to open a school to train United States Army Air Corps flight cadets. The "Rankin Aeronautical Academy, Inc." was established and in February 1941, the school began basic (level 1) pilot training in February 1941 at Mefford Field, located about six miles west of the still under-construction Rankin Field. Classes were moved to Rankin Field in May 1941. The airfield was an all-direction turf/soil surface; consisting of a 2,300' x 1,800' rectangular landing/takeoff field. It had a total of five auxiliary airfields for emergency and overflow landings/takeoffs.

In 1939, when war broke out in Europe, Army schools had the capacity to train only 750 pilots a year. Recognizing the need to drastically expand, Hap Arnold initiated a program under which civilian schools provided the first 60 hours of flight time to Army Aviation Cadets. The new program was so successful that the U.S. was able to train pilots faster than it could produce aircraft. While Germany lost air superiority because it was not able to replace pilots killed in combat, Arnold's program began tapering off nine months before D-Day.

Rankin Field became one of the 62 civilian-owned flying schools in the U.S. that taught 1.4 million World War II Army pilots to fly. It was assigned to West Coast Training Center (later Western Flying Training Command). Known sub-bases and auxiliaries were:

- Hunter Auxiliary Field (A-1) 36°14′34″N 119°09′50″W
- Tipton Auxiliary Field (A-2) 36°00′15″N 119°13′42″W
- Strathmore Auxiliary Field (A-3) 36°06′45″N 119°07′15″W
- Tulare Airport (A-4) 36°09′21″N 119°19′43″W
- Trauger Auxiliary Field (A-5) 36°09′44″N 119°02′58″W

Its primary training aircraft was the PT-17 Stearman, of which over 200 were assigned. The cadets at the school received both ground and flight instruction; with a ratio of one instructor to one cadet for the nine-week course. The mission of the school was to train the best pilots possible for the USAAF, and this was done with a highly rigorous and demanding course which many cadets were unable to complete satisfactorily. In addition to pilots, a ground mechanic school was conducted with the same high level of training and demands on the students.

With the end of World War II, Rankin Academy closed and the airfield was inactivated on 30 September 1945. 10,000 pilots were graduated during its existence, including 12 who became Aces. Among those trained at Rankin were two Congressional Medal of Honor recipients, Major Richard Bong, who went on to become the top Ace of the United States Army Air Force, shooting down at least 40 Japanese aircraft, primarily in P-38 Lightnings in the Western Pacific, and Captain Frank Furey.

The airfield was sold after the war, being used as a private airfield. Today a hangar and some of the wartime era buildings still remain. Today, the site operates as the Rankin Field Weapons Range, a shooting range operated by the Tulare County Sheriffs Association.

== See also ==
- California World War II Army Airfields
- 35th Flying Training Wing (World War II)
