= Never Ending Tour 2001 =

2001 concert tour by Bob Dylan

- Tour by Bob Dylan
- Poster to the concert in Ashwaubenon, USA
- Start date: February 25, 2001
- End date: November 24, 2001
- Legs: 6
- No. of shows: 13 in Asia; 9 in Oceania; 62 in North America; 22 in Europe; 106 in Total

Bob Dylan concert chronology
- Never Ending Tour 2000 (2000); Never Ending Tour 2001 (2001); Never Ending Tour 2002 (2002)

The Never Ending Tour is the popular name for Bob Dylan's endless touring schedule since June 7, 1988.

== Background ==
The Never Ending Tour 2001 started in Japan, where Dylan had not performed since 1997. Dylan then toured Australia where he had not played since 1998.

After finishing his Australasian tour Dylan started to tour the United States performing fourteen shows throughout late April and early May. Shortly after completing the spring tour Dylan recorded his 31st studio album Love and Theft.

Dylan toured Europe in late June and throughout July performing at several music festivals including Roskilde Festival in Denmark.

Dylan returned to North America to perform concerts in August including several concerts at State Fairs. The United States Summer Tour came to an end on August 25 in Lancaster, California. Dylan returned to touring on October 5 in Spokane, Washington and ended in Boston on November 24. This was Dylan's 23rd performance in Boston.

== Tour dates ==
Date	City	Country	Venue
Asia
February 25, 2001	Omiya	Japan	Sonic City Main Hall
February 27, 2001	Sendai	Japan	Sun Plaza
February 28, 2001	Akita	Japan	Akita Prefectural Hall
March 2, 2001	Yokohama	Japan	Pacifico Yokohama
March 3, 2001	Tokyo	Japan	Tokyo International Forum
March 4, 2001	Tokyo	Japan	Tokyo International Forum
March 6, 2001	Osaka	Japan	Kosei-Nenkin Hall
March 7, 2001	Osaka	Japan	Kosei-Nenkin Hall
March 9, 2001	Fukuoka	Japan	Sun Palace
March 10, 2001	Hiroshima	Japan	Kosei-Nenkin Hall
March 12, 2001	Nagoya	Japan	Nagoya Civic Assembly Hall
March 13, 2001	Hamamatsu	Japan	Act City Hamamatsu
March 13, 2001	Tokyo	Japan	Nippon Budokan
Australia
March 18, 2001	Perth	Australia	Perth Entertainment Centre
March 20, 2001	Adelaide	Australia	Adelaide Entertainment Centre
March 21, 2001	Melbourne	Australia	Rod Laver Arena
March 23, 2001	Tamworth	Australia	Tamworth Regional Entertainment Centre
March 24, 2001	Newcastle	Australia	Newcastle Entertainment Centre
March 25, 2001	Sydney	Australia	Centennial Park
March 28, 2001	Cairns	Australia	Cairns Convention Centre
March 30, 2001	Brisbane	Australia	Brisbane Entertainment Centre
March 31, 2001	Ballina	Australia	Kingsford Smith Park
North America (First Leg)
April 18, 2001	Boulder	United States	Coors Events Center
April 20, 2001	Kearney	United States	Viaero Event Center
April 21, 2001	Topeka	United States	Landon Arena
April 23, 2001	Lincoln	United States	Pershing Auditorium
April 24, 2001	Columbia	United States	Hearnes Center
April 25, 2001	Cape Girardeau	United States	Show Me Center
April 27, 2001	Knoxville	United States	Chilhowee Park
April 28, 2001^{[A]}	Charlotte	United States	Budweiser WEND/WRFX Stage
April 29, 2001	Blacksburg	United States	Burruss Auditorium
May 1, 2001	Asheville	United States	Asheville Civic Center
May 2, 2001	Dalton	United States	Trade & Convention Center
May 4, 2001^{[B]}	Atlanta	United States	Jose Cuervo 96 Rock Stage
May 5, 2001^{[C]}	Nashville	United States	Riverfront Park
May 6, 2001^{[D]}	Memphis	United States	AutoZone Stage
Europe
June 24, 2001	Trondheim	Norway	Sentrum/Torget
June 26, 2001	Bergen	Norway	Nygårdsparken
June 28, 2001	Langesund	Norway	Korshavn
June 29, 2001	Gothenburg	Sweden	Trädgårdsföreningen
June 30, 2001^{[E]}	Roskilde	Denmark	Dyrskuepladsen
July 1, 2001	Helsingborg	Sweden	Sofiero Castle
July 3, 2001	Borgholm	Sweden	Borgholm Castle
July 5, 2001	Braunschweig	Germany	Stadthalle
July 7, 2001	Schwäbisch Gmünd	Germany	Universitätspark
July 8, 2001^{[F]}	Montreux	Switzerland	Stravinsky Hall
July 10, 2001	Brescia	Italy	Piazza del Duomo
July 12, 2001^{[G]}	Liverpool	England	King's Dock
July 13, 2001	Stirling	Scotland	Stirling Castle
July 15, 2001^{[H]}	Kilkenny	Ireland	Nowlan Park
July 17, 2001^{[I]}	Loerrach	Germany	Rötteln Castle
July 18, 2001	Bad Reichenhall	Germany	Alte Saline
July 20, 2001	La Spezia	Italy	Stadio Alberto Picco
July 22, 2001	Pescara	Italy	Teatro D'Annunzio
July 24, 2001^{[J]}	Anzio	Italy	Stadio Comunale
July 25, 2001	Perugia	Italy	Parco Arena D. San Giuliana
July 26, 2001	Naples	Italy	Arena Flegrea
July 28, 2001	Taormina	Italy	Teatro Greco
North America (Second Leg)
August 10, 2001^{[K]}	Des Moines	United States	Iowa State Fair Grandstand
August 11, 2001^{[L]}	Sedalia	United States	Missouri State Fairgrounds
August 12, 2001^{[M]}	Springfield	United States	Illinois State Fairgrounds
August 14, 2001	Little Rock	United States	Riverfest Amphitheater
August 15, 2001	Oklahoma City	United States	Zoo Amphitheater
August 16, 2001	Wichita	United States	Century II Convention Hall
August 18, 2001^{[N]}	Pueblo	United States	Colorado State Fair Events Center
August 19, 2001	Vail	United States	Gerald Ford Amphitheater
August 20, 2001	Telluride	United States	Town Park
August 21, 2001	Telluride	United States	Town Park
August 23, 2001	Sun City West	United States	Sundome for the Performing Arts
August 24, 2001	Paradise	United States	The Joint
August 25, 2001^{[O]}	Lancaster	United States	Apollo Park
North America (Third Leg)
October 5, 2001	Spokane	United States	Veterans Memorial Arena
October 6, 2001	Seattle	United States	KeyArena
October 7, 2001	Corvallis	United States	Gill Coliseum
October 9, 2001	Medford	United States	Compton Arena
October 10, 2001	Sacramento	United States	Sacramento Convention Center Complex
October 12, 2001	San Jose	United States	HP Pavilion at San Jose
October 13, 2001	San Francisco	United States	Bill Graham Civic Auditorium
October 14, 2001	Santa Barbara	United States	UC Santa Barbara Events Center
October 17, 2001	San Diego	United States	RIMAC Arena
October 19, 2001	Los Angeles	United States	Staples Center
October 21, 2001	Denver	United States	Denver Coliseum
October 23, 2001	Sioux City	United States	Orpheum Theatre
October 24, 2001	La Crosse	United States	La Crosse Center
October 25, 2001	Saint Paul	United States	Xcel Energy Center
October 27, 2001	Chicago	United States	United Center
October 28, 2001	Milwaukee	United States	U.S. Cellular Arena
October 30, 2001	Ashwaubenon	United States	Brown County Veterans Memorial Arena
October 31, 2001	Madison	United States	Kohl Center
November 2, 2001	Terre Haute	United States	Hulman Center
November 3, 2001	Nashville	United States	Municipal Auditorium
November 4, 2001	Cincinnati	United States	Cintas Center
November 6, 2001	Grand Rapids	United States	Van Andel Arena
November 8, 2001	Toronto	Canada	Air Canada Centre
November 9, 2001	Detroit	United States	Cobo Arena
November 10, 2001	Columbus	United States	Nationwide Arena
November 11, 2001	University Park	United States	Bryce Jordan Center
November 13, 2001	Syracuse	United States	Onondaga County War Memorial
November 14, 2001	Morgantown	United States	WVU Coliseum
November 15, 2001	Washington, D.C.	United States	MCI Center
November 17, 2001	Philadelphia	United States	First Union Spectrum
November 19, 2001	New York City	United States	Madison Square Garden
November 20, 2001	Uncasville	United States	Mohegan Sun Arena
November 21, 2001	Manchester	United States	Verizon Wireless Arena
November 23, 2001	Portland	United States	Cumberland County Civic Center
November 24, 2001	Boston	United States	TD Garden

Festivals and other miscellaneous performances

^{A} This concert was a part of "Center City Fest".
^{B} This concert was a part of "Music Midtown 2001".
^{C} This concert was a part of "Nashville River Stages 2001".
^{D} This concert was a part of "Memphis in May".
^{E} This concert was a part of "Roskilde Festival".
^{F} This concert was a part of "Montreux Jazz Festival".
^{G} This concert was a part of "Liverpool Summer Pops".
^{H} This concert was a part of "Smithwicks Source Festival".

^{I} This concert was a part of "Stimmen 2001".
^{J} This concert was a part of "Anzio Jazz Festival".
^{K} This concert was a part of "Iowa State Fair".
^{L} This concert was a part of "Missouri State Fair".
^{M} This concert was a part of "Illinois State Fair".
^{N} This concert was a part of "Colorado State Fair".
^{O} This concert was a part of "Antelope Valley Fair".

Cancellations and rescheduled shows

July 6, 2001	Steinbach-Hallenberg, Germany	Naturtheater	Cancelled
July 19, 2001	Udine, Italy	Primo Maggio Square	Cancelled

=== Box office score data ===
Venue	City	Tickets Sold / Available	Gross Revenue
Sonic Hall	Omiya, Japan	2,505 / 2,505 (100%)	$204,158
Tri-City Arena	Kearney, Nebraska	5,000 / 5,000 (100%)	$147,500
Burruss Auditorium	Blacksburg, Virginia	2,800 / 2,800 (100%)	$84,000
Nygaardsparken	Bergen, Norway	6,000 / 6,000 (100%)	$433,068
Krogshavn	Langesund, Norway	4,500 / 4,500 (100%)	$317,073
Borgholms Slott	Borgholm, Sweden	4,500 / 4,500 (100%)	$184,500
Stravinsky Auditorium	Montreux, Switzerland	3,500 / 3,500 (100%)	$686,856
King Dock	Liverpool, England	4,200 / 4,200 (100%)	$216,104
Castle	Stirling, Scotland	7,000 / 7,000 (100%)	$404,504
Century II Convention Hall	Wichita, Kansas	5,244 / 5,700 (92%)	$167,808
Gerald Ford Amphitheater	Vail, Colorado	2,715 / 2,715 (100%)	$128,963
RIMAC Arena	La Jolla, California	4,741 / 5,500 (86%)	$168,306
Cumberland County Civic Center	Portland, Maine	8,726 / 9,500 (92%)	$257,417
TOTAL		61,431 / 63,420 (97%)	$3,400,257
