= Eckert Field Airport =

Eckert Field Airport Trauger Air Force Auxiliary Field
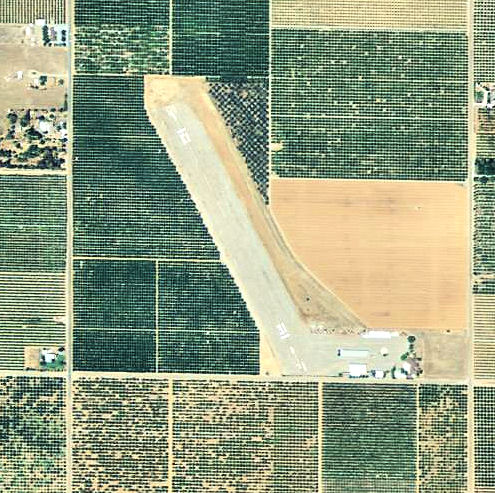
- 2006 USGS airphoto
- IATA: none; ICAO: none; FAA LID: 1Q1

Summary
- Serves: Strathmore, California
- Coordinates: 36°09′44″N 119°03′02″W

Map
- Location of Eckert Field Airport

Runways
Direction	Length		Surface
Direction	ft	m	Surface
13/31	2,000	610	Asphalt

Eckert Field Airport is a general aviation airport located 1 mile (1.6 km) northeast of Strathmore, California.

== History ==
During World War II, the airport was designated as Trauger Auxiliary Field (A-5)). It was used by the United States Army Air Forces as an auxiliary training airfield for the flying school at Rankin Field, California.

== See also ==
- California World War II Army Airfields
