= West Yosemite League =

High school athletic league in California

The West Yosemite League is a high school athletic league that is part of the CIF Central Section. There is a seasonal selection of All League players in the scope of sports administered by the league.

Among the sports governed by the league are football, cross country, wrestling, track and field and baseball

== Members ==
- Dinuba High School
- Hanford High School
- Lemoore High School
- Mission Oak High School
- Tulare Union High School
- Tulare Western High School
