= Half-court =

Half-court may refer to:

- Half-court line, a line on the basketball court
- Half-court basketball or 3x3 basketball, a variant of basketball played on a half-court with 3 players per side
- Half-court shot, a shot taken from the half-court line in basketball
