= World Ag Expo =

Annual farm show in California, U.S.

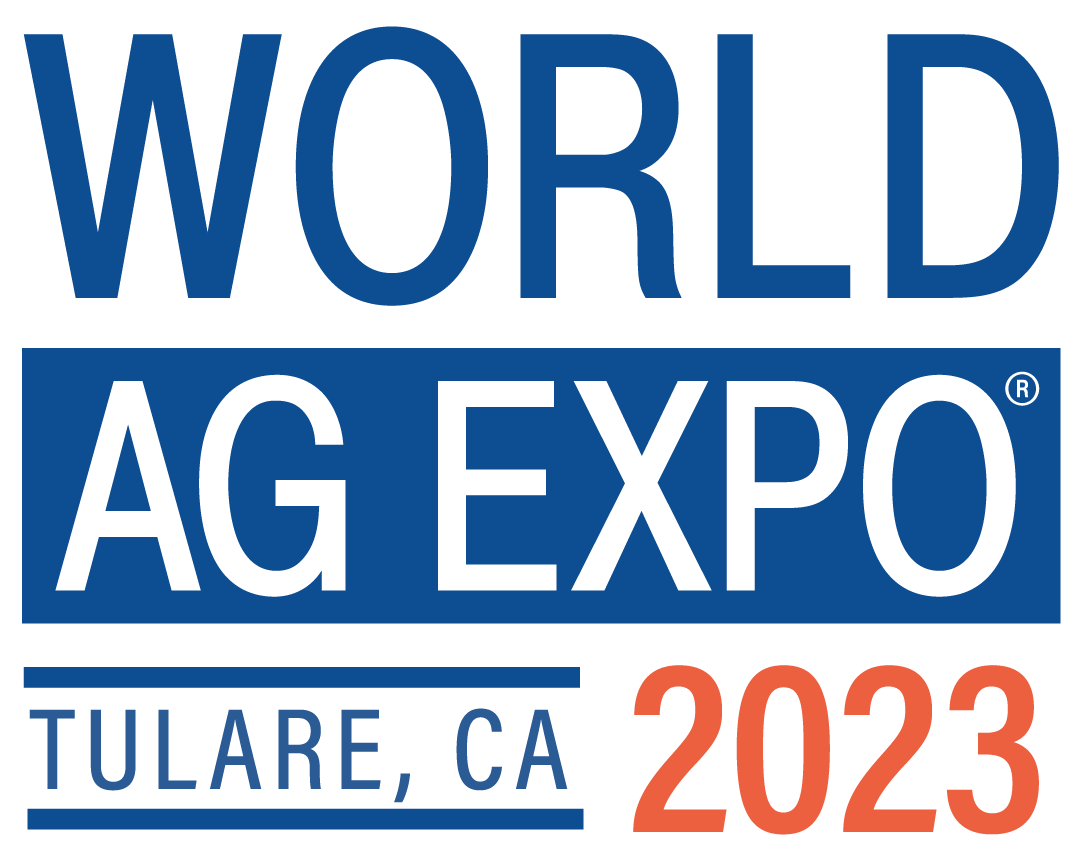
- 2023 WAE Logo Color

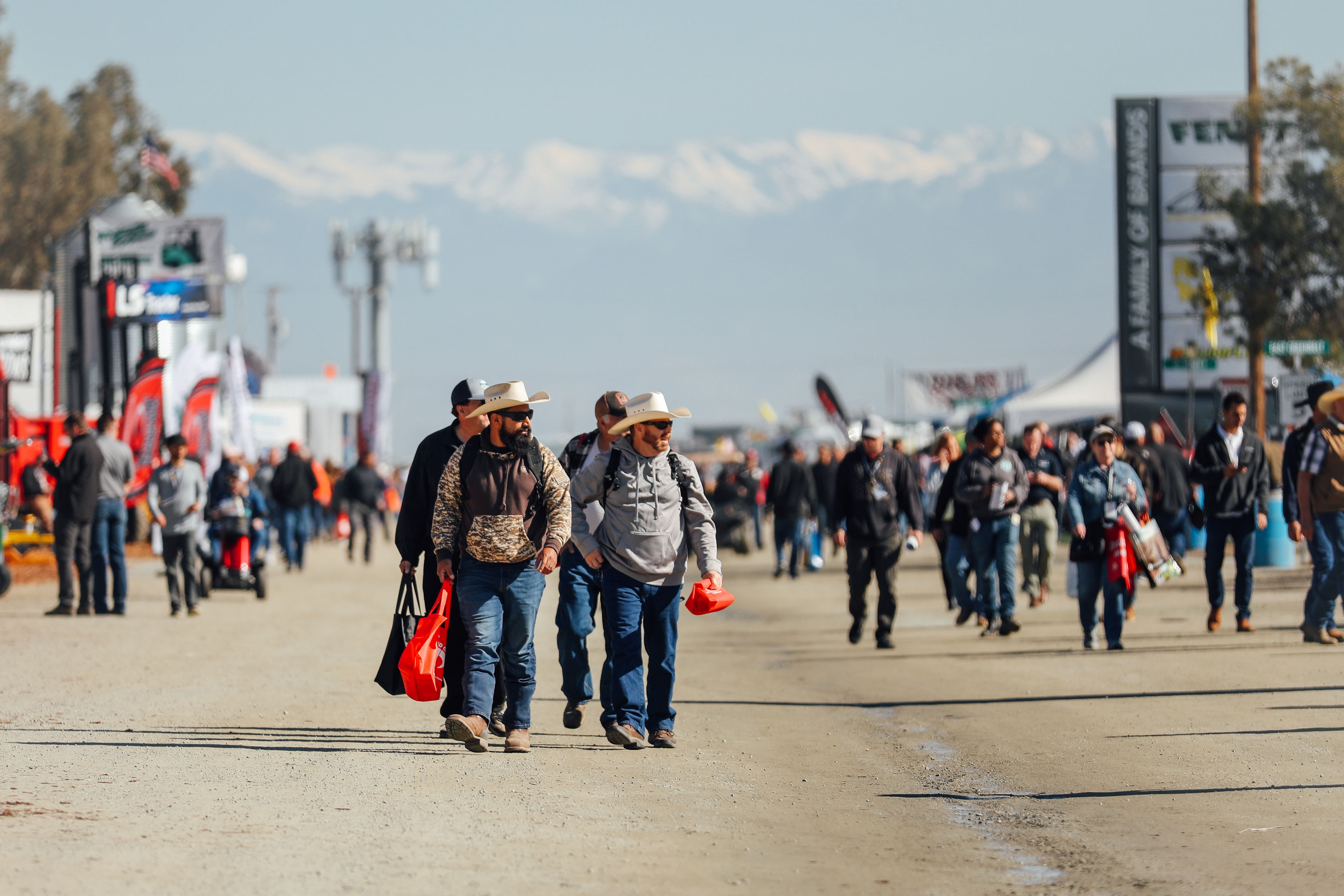
- Attendees walk down North Street at the 2020 World Ag Expo in Tulare, California
- Status: Active
- Genre: Exposition
- Frequency: Annually
- Venue: International Agri-Center
- Locations: 4500 S Laspina Street, Tulare, California
- Coordinates: 36.1662°N 119.3266°W
- Country: United States
- Inaugurated: 1968
- Website: www.worldagexpo.com

World Ag Expo is the largest annual outdoor agricultural exposition with over 1,200 exhibitors and an attendance of more than 100,000 each year. It is held at the International Agri-Center in Tulare, California, in the United States, starting on the second Tuesday of February. It has officially been designated by the U.S. Department of Commerce as an affiliate of the Foreign Buyer Program, which encourages export of American-made goods. Prior to its 2001 rename, the event was called the California Farm Equipment Show and International Exposition.

== Contests ==
The show features an innovation contest among its exhibitors each year. The World Ag Expo Top-10 New Products Contest highlights new agtech, equipment, services, and more. Exhibitors must apply for the contest and their submissions are reviewed by a panel of judges. The winners are featured at the show and are covered widely in the media.

== Structures ==
The Farm Credit Dairy Center is an indoor multipurpose arena located in the Heritage Complex, which is the site of the World Ag Expo. The arena contains no permanent seats; however up to 8,000 portable seats in stands can be brought in for sporting events, concerts, boxing, professional wrestling and graduation ceremonies. Conventions and trade shows are also held here.

== Milestones ==
The show started in 1968 and was attended by 28,000 people. It outgrew its original home and moved to its current permanent location where it occupies 2.6 million square feet of exhibit space, the International Agri-Center in 1982.

World Ag Expo celebrated its 50th anniversary in 2017.

The 2018 edition included a visit by US Secretary of Agriculture Sonny Perdue, 1,480 exhibitors and 106,700 attendees came from 49 states and 63 countries.

The 2019 edition included a visit by NASA Administrator Jim Bridenstine. 1,452 exhibitors and 102,878 attendees came from 48 states, the District of Columbia, and 65 countries.

The 2020 edition was visited by American Farm Bureau President Zippy Duvall. 1,442 exhibitors and 106,357 attendees came from 46 states and 56 countries. This was the first year Hemp related exhibitors were invited to be involved in the show.

The 2021 edition went online due to the COVID-19 pandemic. The digital show was a success - 752 exhibitors and an impressive 24,639 visits over three days came from users in 70 countries, 49 states, and the District of Columbia. The 2021 Digital Show featured more than 120 education seminars and can be viewed online.
