= Tulare Western High School =

Location
- 824 W. Maple Avenue; Tulare, California 93274; United States; 36.2151°N 119.35864°W

Information
- Established: 1959
- School district: Tulare Joint Union High School
- NCES School ID: 063993006620
- Principal: Tou Lor
- Teaching staff: 84.73 (FTE)
- Enrollment: 1,886 (2023-2024)
- Student to teacher ratio: 22.26
- Colors: Red, white, and navy blue
- Mascot: Mustang
- Rivals: Tulare Union High School; Mission Oak High School
- Website: twhs.tjuhsd.org

Tulare Western High School (/tʊˈlɛəri/) is a public high school in Tulare, California, United States. Tulare Western's current enrollment is close to 2,100, making it the largest of the three Tulare high schools. The school is part of the Tulare Joint Union High School District, along with Tulare Union High School and Mission Oak High School, headquartered in Tulare, with Lucy Van Scyoc as District Superintendent.

Tulare Western was established in 1959. Its new principal is Tou Lor, who replaced Sara Morton. Campus capacity for students is about 2,100. Before the opening of Tulare's newest high school (Mission Oak high school), Western's enrollment was as high as 2,700.

School colors are red, white and navy blue. The school's mascot is the Mustangs. Its athletic teams compete in the six-team West Yosemite League, and their rivals are the Tulare Union Tribe and the Mission Oak Hawks.

== Varsity football records ==
Year	Coach	Record	Playoffs	City Title	League Title
2004	Luis DaSilva	10-4-0	Lost in Finals to East Bakersfield	City Champs (Tulare Western)	EYL Champions (Tulare Western)
2005	Luis DaSilva	3-8-0	Lost in the first round to Ridgeview	City Champs (Tulare Union)	EYL Champions (Tulare Union)
2006	Luis DaSilva	6-5-0	Lost in the first round to El Diamanté	City Champs (Tulare Western)	EYL Champions (Monache and Granite Hills)
2007	Luis DaSilva	6-5-0	Lost in the first round to Fresno	City Champs (Tulare Union)	EYL Champions (Tulare Union)
2008	Luis DaSilva	0-10-0	Did not qualify	City Champs (Tulare Union)	EYL Champions (Tulare Union)
2009	Luis DaSilva	3-7-0	Did not qualify	City Champs (Tulare Union)	EYL Champions (Tulare Union)
2010	Luis DaSilva	6-5-0	Lost in the first round to Sunnyside	City Champs (Tulare Union)	EYL Champions (Porterville)
2011	Stevan Chamalbide	3-7-0	Did not qualify	City Champs (Tulare Union)	EYL Champions (Delano and Tulare Union)
2012	Stevan Chamalbide	0-10-0	Did not qualify	City Champions (Mission Oak)	EYL Champions (Mission Oak and Tulare Union)
2013	Ryan Rocha	7-4-0	Lost in Quarterfinals to Independence	City Champs (Mission Oak)	EYL Champions Mission Oak
2014	Ryan Rocha	7-4-0	Lost in Quarterfinals to Bakersfield Christian	Co-City Champs (N/A)	EYL Champs (Mission Oak and Tulare Union)
2015	Ryan Rocha	9-4-0	Lost in Semifinals to SJM	City Champs (Tulare Western)	EYL Champs Tulare Western
2016	Ryan Rocha	9-4-0	Lost in Finals to Bakersfield Christian (Division III Championship)	City Champs Tulare Union	EYL Champs Tulare Union
2017	Ryan Rocha	11-2-0	Lost in Finals to San Joaquin Memorial (Division III Championship)	City Champs Tulare Union	EYL Champs Tulare Union
2018	Ryan Rocha	9-2-0	Lost in Quarterfinals to Stockdale	City Champs Tulare Union	EYL Champs Tulare Union
2019	Ryan Rocha	11-3-0	Won	City Champs Tulare Western	EYL Champs Tulare Western
2020	Ryan Rocha	3-1-0	Did not qualify	City Champs Tulare Western	EYL Champs Tulare Union
2021	Derek Rosa	6-5-0	Lost in Quarterfinals to Bakersfield	City Champs Tulare Union	EYL Champs Mission Oak
2022	Derek Rosa	2-8-0	Did not qualify	City Champs Tulare Union	EYL Champs Lemoore
