= TWH =

TWH or twh could refer to:

- Tai Dón language, a language of Vietnam, Laos, and China
- Tai Wo Hau station, Hong Kong; MTR station code
- Tennessee Walking Horse, a breed of horse
- Toronto Western Hospital, a hospital in Toronto, Canada
- Tung Wah Hospital, a hospital in Sheung Wan, Hong Kong
- Terawatt-hour (TWh), a measure of electrical energy, 10^{12} watt-hours
- The White House, the official residence and principal workplace of the president of the United States
- TWH Collectibles, a diecast scale model vehicle manufacturer.
