= Tulare, California =

City in California, United States

- City
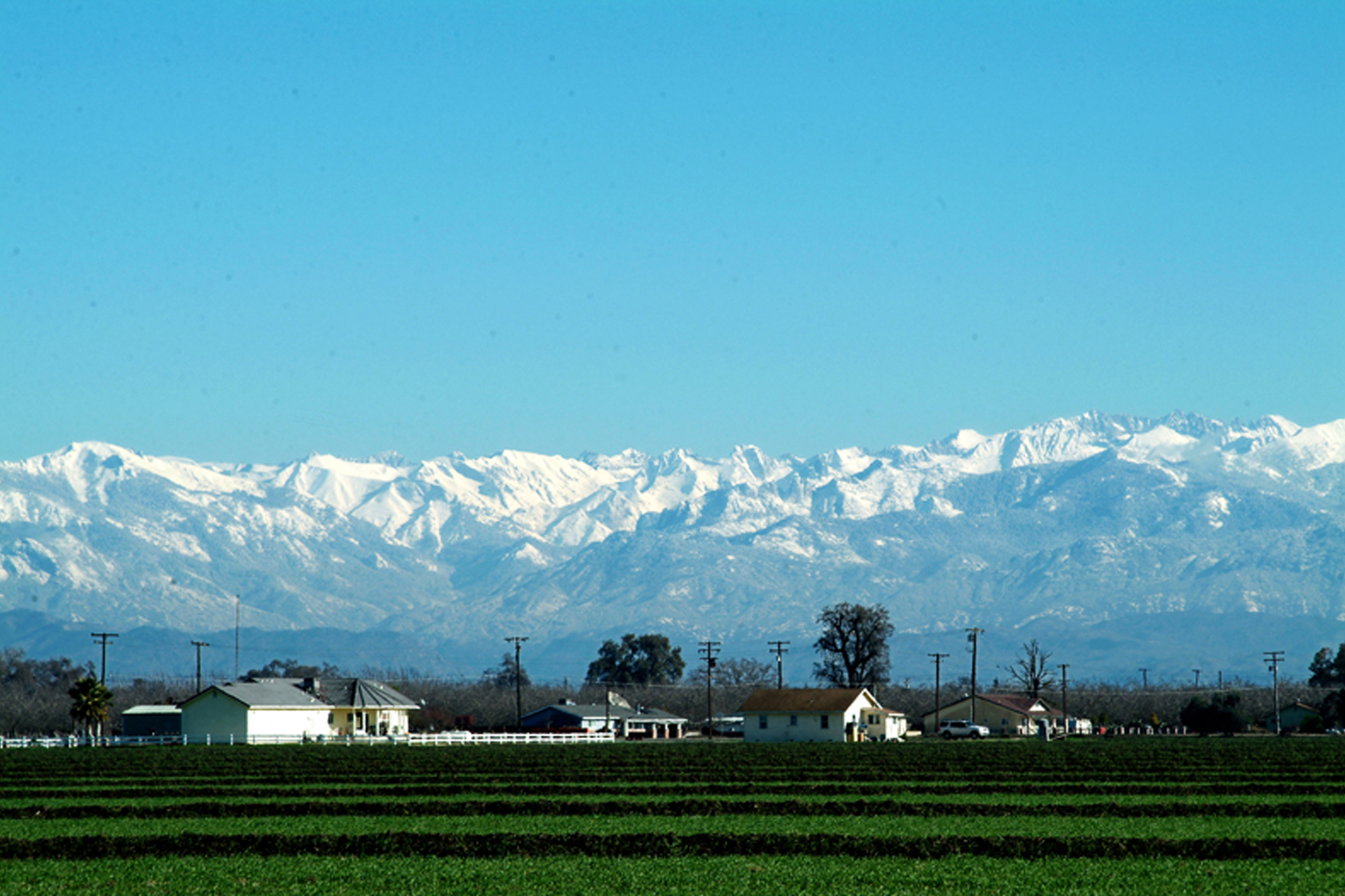
- View of Sierra Nevada mountains
- Interactive map of Tulare, California
- Location in the United States
- Coordinates: 36°12′24″N 119°20′33″W
- Country: United States
- State: California
- Region: San Joaquin Valley
- County: Tulare
- Incorporated: April 5, 1888

Government
  - Type: Council/Manager
  - Mayor: Patrick Isherwood
  - City Council: Vice Mayor Stephen C. Harrell, Jose Sigala, Terry A. Sayre, and Dennis A. Mederos
  - City Manager: Marc Mondell

Area
  - Total: 20.46 sq mi (53.00 km^{2})
  - Land: 20.39 sq mi (52.80 km^{2})
  - Water: 0.077 sq mi (0.20 km^{2}) 0.37%
- Elevation: 289 ft (88 m)

Population (2020)
  - Total: 68,875
  - Density: 3,213/sq mi (1,240.5/km^{2})
- Time zone: UTC-8 (Pacific (PST))
  - Summer (DST): UTC-7 (PDT)
- ZIP codes: 93274, 93275
- Area code: 559
- FIPS code: 06-80644
- GNIS feature IDs: 1652803, 2412107
- Website: tulare.ca.gov

Tulare (/tʊˈlɛəri/ tuu-LAIR-ee) is a city in Tulare County, California, United States. The population was 68,875 per the 2020 census. It is located in the heart of the San Joaquin Valley, 8 mi (13 km) south of Visalia and 60 mi (97 km) north of Bakersfield. The city is named after the Tulare Lake, once the largest freshwater lake west of the Great Lakes.

== Etymology ==
The English name Tulare derives ultimately from Classical Nahuatl tōllin, "sedge" or "reeds", by way of Spanish tule, which also exists in English as a loanword. The name is cognate with Tula, Tultepec, and Tultitlán de Mariano Escobedo.

== History ==
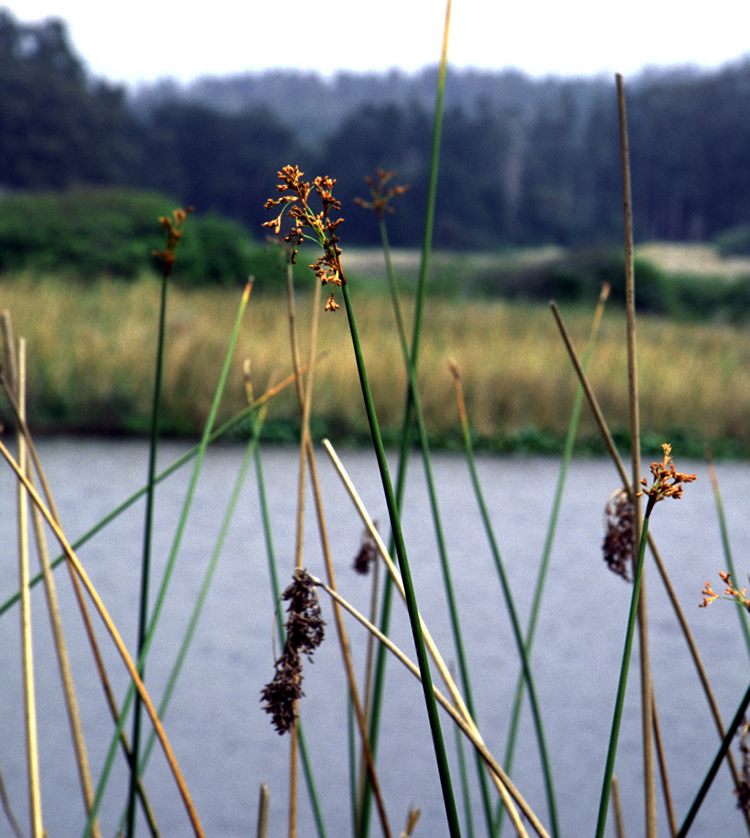
Tule rush

The Yokuts people built reed boats and fished in what was later to be called Tulare Lake in their homeland for centuries, until the invasion and settlement by the Spanish and American pioneers. When California became a state in 1850, Tulare did not yet exist as a town. Tulare was founded in 1872, by the Southern Pacific Railroad. Tule is the town's namesake.

Transportation was the first impetus behind the establishment of the town. The town burnt down and being rebuilt three times in its first fourteen years. Tulare was incorporated in 1888.

In 1891, the railroad went to Bakersfield. Although the railroad was gone, the community of Tulare struggled to become an agricultural center for California, which it is today. Due to the 10 inches (250 mm) of rainfall, water resources had to be found. To bring water to Tulare, citizens established the Tulare Irrigation District and issued $500,000 in bonds to build an extensive canal system carrying water from the Sierra Nevada. In 1903, when the bonds were paid off early, they celebrated by having a bond-burning celebration.

In 1912, Hulett C. Merritt founded Tagus Ranch, which at 7,000 acres (2,800 ha) was the largest fruit ranch in the world. Until its close, Tagus Ranch produce was known the world over, and was served in the finest restaurants throughout America. At the end of World War II, a portion of Tagus Ranch served as a German POW camp.

The cotton strike of 1933 was planned in Tulare by a group of seventy-eight men and women. As recorded by Chicano historian Rodolfo Acuña, "they concluded that it took the average picker 10 hours to harvest 300 pounds. Planters offered 40 cents a hundredweight – that was not enough to buy enough food and gas to get to the next job."

In 1940, famed aerobatic stunt pilot J.G. "Tex" Rankin secured a U.S. War Department contract to open and operate a civilian flying school to train United States Army Air Corps flight cadets. Rankin opened the Rankin Aeronautical Academy in Tulare in February 1941, where it operated throughout the duration of World War II. During its heyday Rankin Field, as it was otherwise known, trained 10,000 pilots in primary flight training, including twelve future Army Air Corps Aces and two Medal of Honor recipients.

During World War II, in response to the Attack on Pearl Harbor and the West Coast wartime hysteria, the U.S. Army temporarily assumed control of the Tulare County Fairgrounds, converting it to the Tulare Assembly Center, a temporary detention center for Japanese Americans. The Assembly Center was administered by the Wartime Civil Control Administration, under the Western Defense Command and the U.S. 4th Army. The first internee was inducted on April 27, 1942, and the last internee departed on September 4, 1942. The top population numbered 4,978 residents, many of whom were citizens born in the United States. In the latter part of 1942, internees began being moved to the ten more permanent "War Relocation Camps". The majority of internees from the Tulare Assembly Center were sent to the Gila River War Relocation Center in Arizona. These temporary sites were largely located on fairgrounds or race tracks in completely public and visible locations.

Tulare was the site of the National Championships for the Decathlon in Track and Field in 1949, 1950, 1952, and 1962, as well as the Olympic Trials for the Decathlon in 1952.

== Geography ==
Tulare is located at 36°12′24″N 119°20′33″W (36.206601, −119.342404). Located directly between Fresno and Bakersfield, Tulare is in the heart of the Central Valley. Although the foothills of the Sierra Nevada are only about 20 miles east of town, they are seldom visible due to the chronically poor air quality and very high levels of airborne particulate matter, soot, and other pollution.

According to the United States Census Bureau, the city has a total area of 20.5 square miles (53 km^{2}), of which 20.4 square miles (53 km^{2}) is land and 0.08 square miles (0.21 km^{2}) (0.37%) is water.

=== Climate ===
The climate of this agricultural community is steady, with cool and damp winters with a mean temperature of 45 degrees, but very hot dry summers, with a mean temperatures of 95 to 110 degrees for about ten months out of the year. And very brief spring and fall. Winter transitions to summer very quickly and vice versa. The mean average rainfall was 10 inches prior to the drought that began in 2012 but since receives only about 2-3 inches due to climate change and the fact that Tulare is in a rain shadow. Tulare consistently suffers from year round air pollution and air quality that is among the worst in the United States because of both geographic conditions (hemmed in valley, weak winds) and the prevalence of diesel fuel exhaust from farming and truck traffic on Highway 99. Farming also exacerbates this because it kicks up tremendous amounts of dust, especially in the late summer and autumn months.

== Demographics ==
Historical population
| Census | Pop. | Note | %± |
|---|---|---|---|
| 1880 | 447 | | — |
| 1890 | 2,697 | | 503.4% |
| 1900 | 2,216 | | −17.8% |
| 1910 | 2,758 | | 24.5% |
| 1920 | 3,539 | | 28.3% |
| 1930 | 6,207 | | 75.4% |
| 1940 | 8,259 | | 33.1% |
| 1950 | 12,445 | | 50.7% |
| 1960 | 13,824 | | 11.1% |
| 1970 | 16,235 | | 17.4% |
| 1980 | 22,530 | | 38.8% |
| 1990 | 33,249 | | 47.6% |
| 2000 | 43,994 | | 32.3% |
| 2010 | 59,278 | | 34.7% |
| 2020 | 68,875 | | 16.2% |
| 2024 (est.) | 72,601 | ▲ | 5.4% |
U.S. Decennial Census

=== 2020 census ===
As of the 2020 census, Tulare had a population of 68,875. The population density was 3,378.7 inhabitants per square mile (1,304.5/km^{2}). The median age was 31.1 years. 30.7% of residents were under the age of 18, 10.4% were aged 18 to 24, 27.4% were aged 25 to 44, 20.8% were aged 45 to 64, and 10.7% were 65 years of age or older. For every 100 females, there were 96.9 males, and for every 100 females age 18 and over, there were 94.2 males age 18 and over.

Racial composition as of the 2020 census
| Race | Number | Percent |
|---|---|---|
| White | 28,211 | 41.0% |
| Black or African American | 2,084 | 3.0% |
| American Indian and Alaska Native | 1,301 | 1.9% |
| Asian | 1,715 | 2.5% |
| Native Hawaiian and Other Pacific Islander | 96 | 0.1% |
| Some other race | 21,913 | 31.8% |
| Two or more races | 13,555 | 19.7% |
| Hispanic or Latino (of any race) | 43,617 | 63.3% |

The census reported that 98.4% of the population lived in households, 1.3% lived in non-institutionalized group quarters, and 0.3% were institutionalized. 99.5% of residents lived in urban areas, while 0.5% lived in rural areas.

There were 20,406 households, of which 47.7% had children under the age of 18 living in them. Of all households, 50.6% were married-couple households, 9.1% were cohabiting-couple households, 15.3% were households with a male householder and no spouse or partner present, and 25.0% were households with a female householder and no spouse or partner present. About 15.6% of households were one person, and 7.1% were one person aged 65 or older. The average household size was 3.32. There were 16,193 families (79.4% of all households).

There were 21,153 housing units at an average density of 1,037.7 units per square mile (400.7 units/km^{2}), of which 3.5% were vacant. Of the occupied units, 58.8% were owner-occupied and 41.2% were occupied by renters. The homeowner vacancy rate was 0.9% and the rental vacancy rate was 4.3%.

=== 2023 ACS estimates ===
In 2023, the US Census Bureau estimated that 18.5% of the population were foreign-born. Of all people aged 5 or older, 53.6% spoke only English at home, 40.1% spoke Spanish, 3.3% spoke other Indo-European languages, 2.1% spoke Asian or Pacific Islander languages, and 1.0% spoke other languages. Of those aged 25 or older, 76.5% were high school graduates and 10.7% had a bachelor's degree.

The median household income in 2023 was $69,517, and the per capita income was $26,459. About 15.8% of families and 18.0% of the population were below the poverty line.

=== 2010 census ===
At the 2010 census Tulare had a population of 59,278. The population density was 2,820.5 inhabitants per square mile (1,089.0/km^{2}). The racial makeup of Tulare was 36,347 (61.3%) White, 2,328 (3.9%) African American, 694 (1.2%) Native American, 1,276 (2.2%) Asian, 80 (0.1%) Pacific Islander, 15,713 (26.5%) from other races, and 2,840 (4.8%) from two or more races. Hispanic or Latino people of any race were 34,062 persons (57.5%).

The census reported that 59,000 people (99.5% of the population) lived in households, 62 (0.1%) lived in non-institutionalized group quarters, and 216 (0.4%) were institutionalized.

There were 17,720 households, 8,991 (50.7%) had children under the age of 18 living in them, 9,373 (52.9%) were opposite-sex married couples living together, 3,190 (18.0%) had a female householder with no husband present, 1,507 (8.5%) had a male householder with no wife present. There were 1,543 (8.7%) unmarried opposite-sex partnerships, and 120 (0.7%) same-sex married couples or partnerships. 2,862 households (16.2%) were one person and 1,249 (7.0%) had someone living alone who was 65 or older. The average household size was 3.33. There were 14,070 families (79.4% of households); the average family size was 3.68.

The age distribution was 19,757 people (33.3%) under the age of 18, 6,229 people (10.5%) aged 18 to 24, 16,247 people (27.4%) aged 25 to 44, 11,707 people (19.7%) aged 45 to 64, and 5,338 people (9.0%) who were 65 or older. The median age was 29.1 years. For every 100 females, there were 96.6 males. For every 100 females age 18 and over, there were 93.9 males.

There were 18,863 housing units at an average density of 897.5 per square mile, of the occupied units 10,389 (58.6%) were owner-occupied and 7,331 (41.4%) were rented. The homeowner vacancy rate was 2.8%; the rental vacancy rate was 5.5%. 33,367 people (56.3% of the population) lived in owner-occupied housing units and 25,633 people (43.2%) lived in rental housing units.

=== Culture ===
There is a large population of Portuguese residents in Tulare, many of whom immigrated from the Azores to start farms and dairies in the Central Valley, becoming part of the now famous Central Valley agricultural boom of the 20th century.

== Economy ==
=== Largest employers ===
According to the city's 2023 Annual Comprehensive Financial Report, the top employers in the city are:

| # | Employer | Employees |
|---|---|---|
| 1 | Saputo Cheese USA, Inc. | 1,125 |
| 2 | Tulare City School District | 1,100 |
| 3 | Tulare Joint Union High School District | 667 |
| 4 | Land O'Lakes | 486 |
| 5 | City of Tulare | 381 |
| 6 | Adventist Health Hospital | 355 |
| 7 | Dreyer's Grand Ice Cream | 350 |
| 8 | Lactalis Heritage Dairy | 250 |
| 9 | Walmart | 212 |
| 10 | Twin Oaks Rehabilitation and Nursing Center | 189 |

The backbone of Tulare's economy continues to be its agricultural and dairy industry. Tulare is responsible for a significant part of Tulare County's 342,600 dairy cows, which produce more than 8.9 billion pounds of milk each year. The nation's largest single-site dairy complex, operated by Land O'Lakes, is located in Tulare.

Despite the value of the agriculture industry, Tulare is still considered an economically distressed area and has unemployment and poverty rates that are substantially higher than the state averages since the local economy is not diversified.

Tulare is the home of the Tulare County Fair, held since 1915. Tulare is also home to the internationally known World Ag Expo, held annually each February since 1968 at the International Agri-Center. The three-day event is the largest annual outdoor agricultural exposition in the United States and considered one of the largest of its kind in the world, with over 100,000 visitors and over 1,200 exhibitors.

== Government ==
=== Local government ===
The Mayor and Vice-Mayor are selected by the council for two-year terms.

- Mayor: Patrick Isherwood
- Vice-mayor: Stephen C. Harrell

=== List of mayors ===
This is a list of Tulare mayors by year.

| Term | Mayor | Note(s)/Reference(s) |
|---|---|---|
| 1888–1891 | Charles F. Hall | |
| 1891–1893 | R. N. Hough | |
| 1893–1897 | W. L. Blythe | |
| 1897–1899 | D. J. F. Reed | |
| 1899–1903 | A. E. Miot | |
| 1903–1905 | John Tuohy | |
| 1905–1907 | W. F. Ingwerson | |
| 1907–1915 | H. C. Heitzeg | |
| 1915–1918 | G. W. Jones | |
| 1918–1919 | H. W. Wheeler | |
| 1919–1923 | W. H. Jones | |
| 1923–1927 | W. M. Brown | |
| 1927–1931 | T. C. Hampson | |
| 1931–1935 | William M. Hahesy | |
| 1935–1939 | W. Monte Williams | |
| 1939–1943 | G. Gail Bash | |
| 1943–1947 | George W. Peterson | |
| 1947–1950 | Elmo R. Zumwalt | |
| 1950 | Arthur E. Morter | |
| 1950–1951 | Anthony S. Martin | |
| 1951–1953 | Thomas E. Drilling | |
| 1953–1955 | Jim Ingle | |
| 1955–1957 | Carl Miller | |
| 1957–1963 | Raymond Joncoaltz | |
| 1963–1967 | Melvin Houck | |
| 1967–1973 | Willard R. Glass | |
| 1973–1979 | Norman F. Griesbach | |
| 1979–1983 | Philip E. Vandegrift | |
| 1983–1987 | C. Duane Miller | |
| 1987–1992 | Maurice M. Green | |
| 1992–1998 | Claude Retherford | |
| 1998 | Diane E. Mathis | First female mayor of Tulare |
| 1998–2002 | William R. Cooke | |
| 2002–2004 | David Macedo | |
| 2004–2006 | Richard Ortega | First Latino mayor of Tulare |
| 2006–2010 | Craig Vejvoda | |
| 2010–2012 | Wayne Ross | |
| 2012–2016, 2018 | David Macedo | |
| 2016–2018 | Carlton Jones | First African American mayor of Tulare |
| 2018–2020 | Jose Sigala | |
| 2020–2023 | Dennis A. Mederos | |
| 2023–2024 | Terry A. Sayre | |
| 2024–present | Patrick Isherwood | |

=== State and federal ===
In the California State Legislature, Tulare is in the 12th senatorial district, represented by Republican Shannon Grove, the 16th senatorial district, represented by Democrat Melissa Hurtado, and in the 33rd Assembly district, represented by Republican Alexandra Macedo.

In the United States House of Representatives, Tulare is in California's 20th congressional district, represented by Republican Vince Fong, and California's 22nd congressional district, represented by Republican David Valadao.

== Parks and recreation ==
The City of Tulare maintains a system of public parks and recreational facilities serving neighborhoods throughout the community. Operated by the City of Tulare Parks and Recreation Department, the system includes regional, community, neighborhood, pocket, and linear parks, as well as sports complexes and multi-use trails. The department is responsible for the maintenance and operation of the city's parks, sports fields, recreational facilities, and trail network.

As of 2026, Tulare's park system consists of 20 named parks and recreational areas. Major parks include Elk Bayou Regional Park, Del Lago Community Park, Live Oak Park, Prosperity Sports Park, and Centennial Park. Recreational facilities also include the Santa Fe Trail, Elk Bayou Soccer Complex, and the Rotary Skate Plaza at Topham Park.

| Classification | Park | Image | Description |
|---|---|---|---|
| Regional | Elk Bayou Regional Park | | Regional park featuring sports fields, picnic facilities, playgrounds, and open recreation areas. |
| Community | Centennial Park | | A Community park with tennis courts, softball facilities, playgrounds, picnic shelters, and open green space. |
| Community | Del Lago Community Park | Del Lago Park seen from the pond. | Community park centered around a lake with walking paths, sports courts, picnic areas, and an accessible playground. |
| Community | Live Oak Park | Live Oak Park. | Has sports fields, tennis courts, picnic areas, walking paths, and mature shade trees. |
| Community | Prosperity Sports Park | | Sports-oriented community park with athletic fields, courts, playgrounds, walking paths, and support facilities. |
| Neighborhood | Bender Park | | Neighborhood park with a baseball field, playground, picnic shelter, volleyball court, and walking paths. |
| Neighborhood | Blain Park | | Neighborhood park featuring a playground, picnic shelter, volleyball court, and open recreation space. |
| Neighborhood | Cesar E. Chavez Memorial Park | | Neighborhood park with an amphitheater, baseball field, playground, picnic areas, and community gathering space. |
| Neighborhood | Cypress Park | | Neighborhood park with sports courts, softball field, playground, picnic shelters, and walking paths. |
| Neighborhood | Mulcahy Park | | Neighborhood park featuring a softball field, splash pad, playground, picnic facilities, and walking paths. |
| Neighborhood | Parkwood Meadows Park | | Neighborhood park with a playground, picnic tables, open lawn, and passive recreation areas. |
| Neighborhood | Sunrise Park | | Neighborhood park offering a playground, walking paths, benches, and open green space. |
| Neighborhood | Zumwalt Park | Zumwalt Park Entrance. | Historic neighborhood park with an amphitheater, splash pad, playground, walking paths, and event space. |
| Pocket | Kensington Park | | Small neighborhood pocket park providing local open space and recreation opportunities. |
| Pocket | Mission Oaks Park | | A pocket park with open green space and a playground structure. |
| Pocket | Palm Ranch Oak Park | | Pocket park providing neighborhood open space and passive recreation opportunities. |
| Pocket | Sayre Park | Sayre Park. | Pocket park featuring a playground, half basketball court, benches, and walking paths. |
| Pocket | Tyler Park | | Pocket park with a playground, walking paths, picnic tables, and neighborhood gathering space. |
| Trail | Santa Fe Trail | Trail seen from Laspina. | Multi-use recreational rail trail connecting parks and neighborhoods with paved walking and cycling paths. |
| Sports facilities | Elk Bayou Soccer Complex | | Soccer complex with multiple fields, concessions, picnic areas, restrooms, and parking. |
| Sports facilities | Rotary Skate Plaza at Topham Park | | | Public skatepark designed for skateboarding, scooters, and BMX riding. |

== Education ==
=== K-12 schools ===
The majority of Tulare is in the Tulare City Elementary School District. Pieces of the city limits extend into these elementary school districts: Palo Verde Union Elementary School District, Liberty Elementary School District, Buena Vista Elementary School District, and Oak Valley Union Elementary School District. All areas of Tulare are in the Tulare Joint Union High School District.

The Tulare City School District operates 10 elementary schools, five middle schools, and two k-8 schools in Tulare. The ten elementary schools are Cypress, Heritage, Garden, Kohn, Lincoln, Maple, Mission Valley, Pleasant, Roosevelt, and Wilson. Lincoln, Maple, and Kohn Elementary also have Title I preschools. The five middle schools are Cherry Avenue, Live Oak, Los Tules, Mulcahy, and Community Day School. The K-8 school is Alpine Vista, opened in the 2013–14 school year. There is also a private K-8 school called St. Aloysius. There are also five K-8 country schools: Buena Vista, Oak Valley, Palo Verde, Waukena and Sundale.

Secondary education in Tulare is provided by the Tulare Joint Union High School District. The district operates five high schools in the city: Tulare Union, Tulare Western, Mission Oak, Tech Prep, and Sierra Vista.

=== Higher education ===
Tulare students have two local area community colleges from which to choose: College of the Sequoias in Tulare, and College of the Sequoias in nearby Visalia. College of the Sequoias new Tulare Center for Agriculture and Technology campus, located on East Bardsley Ave in Tulare, opened in 2013. The Tulare Center is forecast to be a full 10,000 student college by 2040.

== Transportation ==
Tulare is located on California's central corridor, State Route 99. State Routes 63 and 137 also serve the city.

=== Air ===
The City of Tulare owns and operates their own municipal airport, Mefford Field, which has an asphalt runway of 3,914 feet. 60 private planes are currently based there.

National/international commercial air service is available from: Fresno (1 hr), Bakersfield (1 hr. 15 min.), as well as limited commercial service available from Visalia (15 min) and Porterville (40 min).

=== Rail ===
Tulare is located on the main line of the Union Pacific Railroad.

Tulare was formerly a station stop on the Visalia District of the Atchison, Topeka and Santa Fe Railway. The rail line has since been removed and converted into a Rail trail.

=== Bus ===
Tulare's Greyhound bus depot offers frequent packages and personnel service to all points in the west. RIDE Tulare County offers a "fixed route" schedule in the city, as well as a Dial-A-Ride service and micro-transit. The service also provides fixed county routes out of town.

== Honors ==
In December 2010 the City of Tulare was recognized with an honorable mention by the California Sustainability Alliance's Sustainability Showcase Awards. The honor commends the city for its commitment to sustainability through extensive building retrofits, residential solar programs and forthcoming citywide Climate Action Plan.

In April 2011 the City of Tulare received the Climate Change Award for the city's Energy Efficient Strategy at the 2011 Green California Summit and Exposition.

In September 2011, the city of Tulare's Redevelopment Agency received a total of two awards for a single redevelopment project. The Tule Vista Housing Development received the first place American Planning Association 2011 Central Section Outstanding Planning Project award, as well as the 2011 Award of Excellence from the California State Chapter of the American Planning Association. The two awards also went to Pacific West Communities and Tulare County Housing Authority, who worked in conjunction with the Tulare Redevelopment Agency on the project.

=== Twin towns – sister cities ===
Tulare's sister cities are:

- Angra do Heroísmo, Azores
- Inverell, Australia

== Notable people ==
- Jack Aker – Major League Baseball player, born in Tulare
- Bryan Allen – pedal-powered aircraft pilot
- Albert Greenwood Brown - on death row for rape and murder
- Bonnie Bryant – LPGA golfer; born in Tulare
- The Charades – popular R&B/doo-wop musical group of the 1960s
- Max Choboian – professional football player for Denver Broncos
- Matt Crafton – NASCAR driver
- Zac Diles – professional football player for Kansas City Chiefs
- Dominique Dorsey – professional football player, the running back for Saskatchewan Roughriders of Canadian Football League
- Jim Ellis – professional baseball player; born in Tulare.
- Fred Ford – professional football player for Buffalo Bills and Los Angeles Chargers
- Hal Fowler – American poker player, world championship winner in 1979, at the 1979 World Series of Poker; long-time resident of Tulare
- Jeremiah Green – professional football player, for Jacksonville Jaguars
- Virgil Green – professional football player, member of Super Bowl 50 champion Denver Broncos; born in Tulare
- Bryce Harris – professional football player for New Orleans Saints
- Sim Iness – Olympic discus gold medalist in 1952 Summer Olympics
- Odell Jones – professional baseball player for five MLB teams; born in Tulare
- Bob Mathias – two-time Olympic decathlon gold medalist and U.S. Congressman; born in Tulare
- Mike Morgan – professional baseball player, member of 2001 World Series champion Arizona Diamondbacks; born in Tulare
- Rance Mulliniks – professional baseball player and broadcaster; born in Tulare
- Lois Neilson – silent movie actress: first wife of actor and comedian Stan Laurel; born in Tulare
- Devin Nunes – U.S. Congressmen from CA; born in Tulare
- General Maurice A. Preston – Air Force four-star general, Commander of USAFE 1966–1968
- Tex Rankin – international aerobatic champion, air racer, barnstormer, and stunt pilot
- Shirley Shahan – pioneering drag racer; first female driver to win an NHRA title
- James Stallworth – world high school record holder for the long jump
- Bob Veith – auto racer; born in Tulare
- Marquess Wilson – professional football player, wide receiver for New York Jets; born in Tulare
- Admiral Elmo R. Zumwalt, Jr. – Chief of Naval Operations 1970–1974
- Richard Torez – Super Heavyweight boxer, silver medalist in Tokyo
