= Tex Rankin =

American aviator (1894-1947)

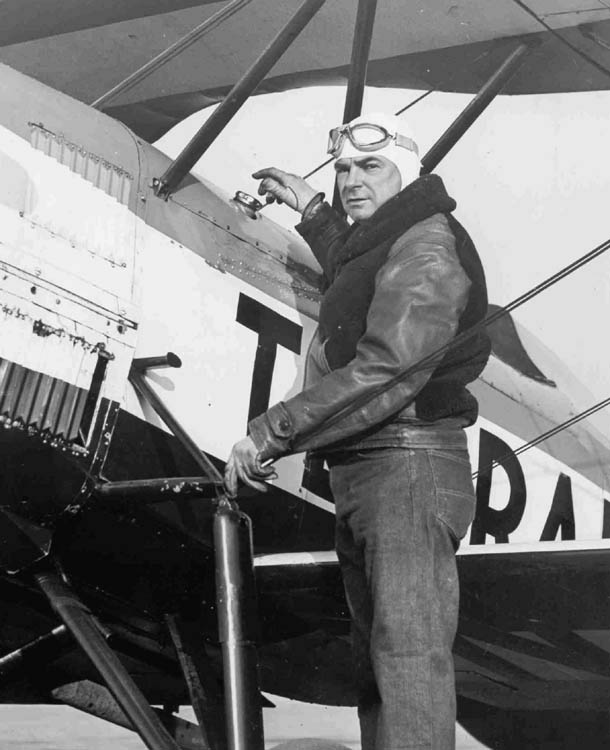
- Born: John Gilbert Rankin; January 20, 1894; Texas, U.S.
- Died: February 23, 1947 (aged 53); Klamath Falls, Oregon, U.S.
- Cause of death: Plane crash
- Awards: Oregon Aviation Hall of Honor; Oregon Aviation Hall of Fame; International Aerobatic Club Hall of Fame

John Gilbert "Tex" Rankin (January 20, 1894 – February 23, 1947) was an aerobatic pilot, barnstormer, air racer, and flight instructor from the 1920s to the 1940s. He created the Rankin Flying Service which trained thousands of pilots at Rankin Field for the US Army Air Force in World War II. He was the 1935 US Aerobatic champion and 1938 World Aerobatic champion.

== Early life ==
Rankin left home at the age of 16 and joined the United States Army. He served in the Aeronautical Division, U.S. Signal Corps which gave him an interest in aviation. After being discharged in 1919, he moved to the State of Washington to learn to fly.

== Aerobatics and flight instructor career ==
In 1920, Rankin opened his first flying school in Walla Walla, Washington. Rankin moved his flight school to Portland, Oregon in 1922, where he established the Rankin Flying Service. By 1928, Rankin's flying school was listed as the largest civilian flying school in the world. Throughout the late 1920s, Rankin went on tour with the Rankin Air Circus, performing barnstorming stunts throughout the west. In August 1929 Rankin flew his historic "Three Flags" flight, being the first flyer to make a flight without stopping or refueling from Canada to Mexico. On January 10, 1930, Rankin established a National Aeronautic Association flying record, for executing and completing 19 consecutive aerial outside loops. In February 1931, he established a new world record for outside loops, completing 78 consecutive loops in 88 minutes. Later that same year, Rankin would set the world record a third time, with a total of 131 loops. Rankin's record stands to this day. Rankin became the U.S. Aerobatic Champion in 1935, at the National Air Races in Cleveland, Ohio. In 1938—by then already well known as a stunt pilot and technical director in Hollywood—Rankin won the International Aerobatic Trophy at the International Aerobatic Competition in St. Louis, Missouri. At the age of 48, Rankin was the oldest entrant in the competition. Rankin's own "Rankin System of Flying Instruction" student instructional books were well known standard reading texts for flying school students throughout the world. Rankin performed daily aerobatic flights to the delight of the crowds at the San Francisco World's Fair. While living in Hollywood, Tex became a member of the Hollywood Motion Pictures Pilot Association and the Screen Actors Guild. Among the celebrities taught to fly by Rankin himself were James Stewart, Errol Flynn, and Edgar Bergen.

== Rankin Field, World War II ==
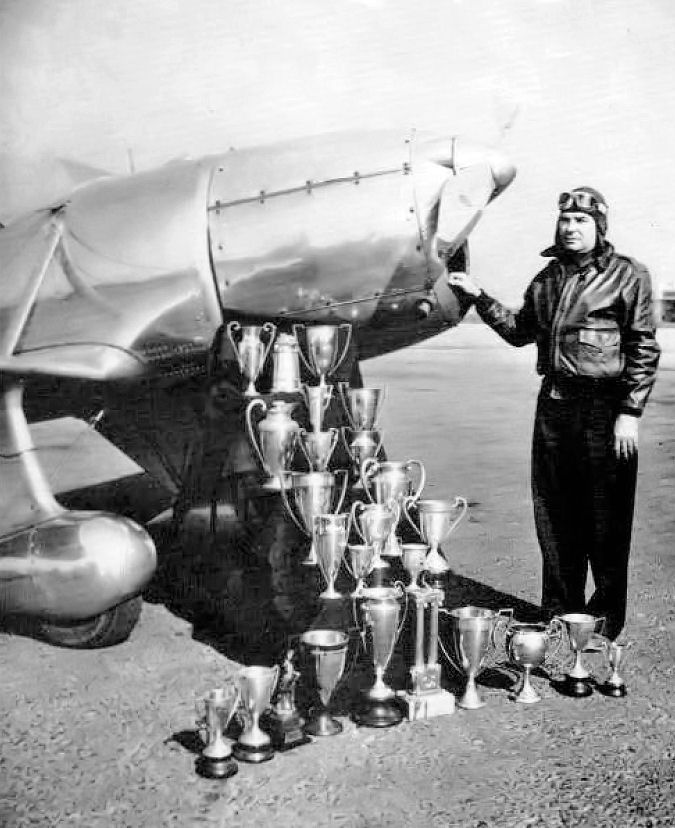
"Tex" Rankin and his flying trophies, taken in 1944 at Rankin Field

After establishing the Rankin School of Flying in Van Nuys, CA in 1939, a year later, Rankin was awarded a Department of Defense contract with the Army Air Corps to operate a civilian primary flying school for soon-to-be cadets. Now with the certification and contracts for his school, Rankin set about finding the school's ideal location. After extensive examination of weather chart conditions, among other factors, Rankin found that the small agricultural town of Tulare, located in the heart of California's San Joaquin Valley was the perfect spot for his flying school. Years worth of weather condition statistics, reflected that the San Joaquin Valley had the best flying conditions weather-wise in the U.S. Tulare's site itself also proved ideal as it was located 12 miles (19 km) east of general use airways and 6 miles (9.7 km) from the heart of town, and initially was a large tract of farm land, which held no undesirable obstructions on it. The school was located 8 miles (13 km) southeast of Tulare, California. At the beginning of the new year in 1941, Rankin flew throughout the U.S., recruiting and hiring flight instructors. With his team assembled, the Rankin Aeronautical Academy received their first civilian cadets began training in March 1941. The academy trained over 10,450 cadets throughout its operation. Rankin graduates included twelve World War II aces, the United States all-time leading ace and Medal of Honor recipient Richard Bong, and Jeppeson navigation charts founder Elrey Jeppeson. A portion of Rankin Field is still in operation, since 1996 it has been used as a firing range for the Tulare County Deputy Sheriff's Association.

== Death and honors ==
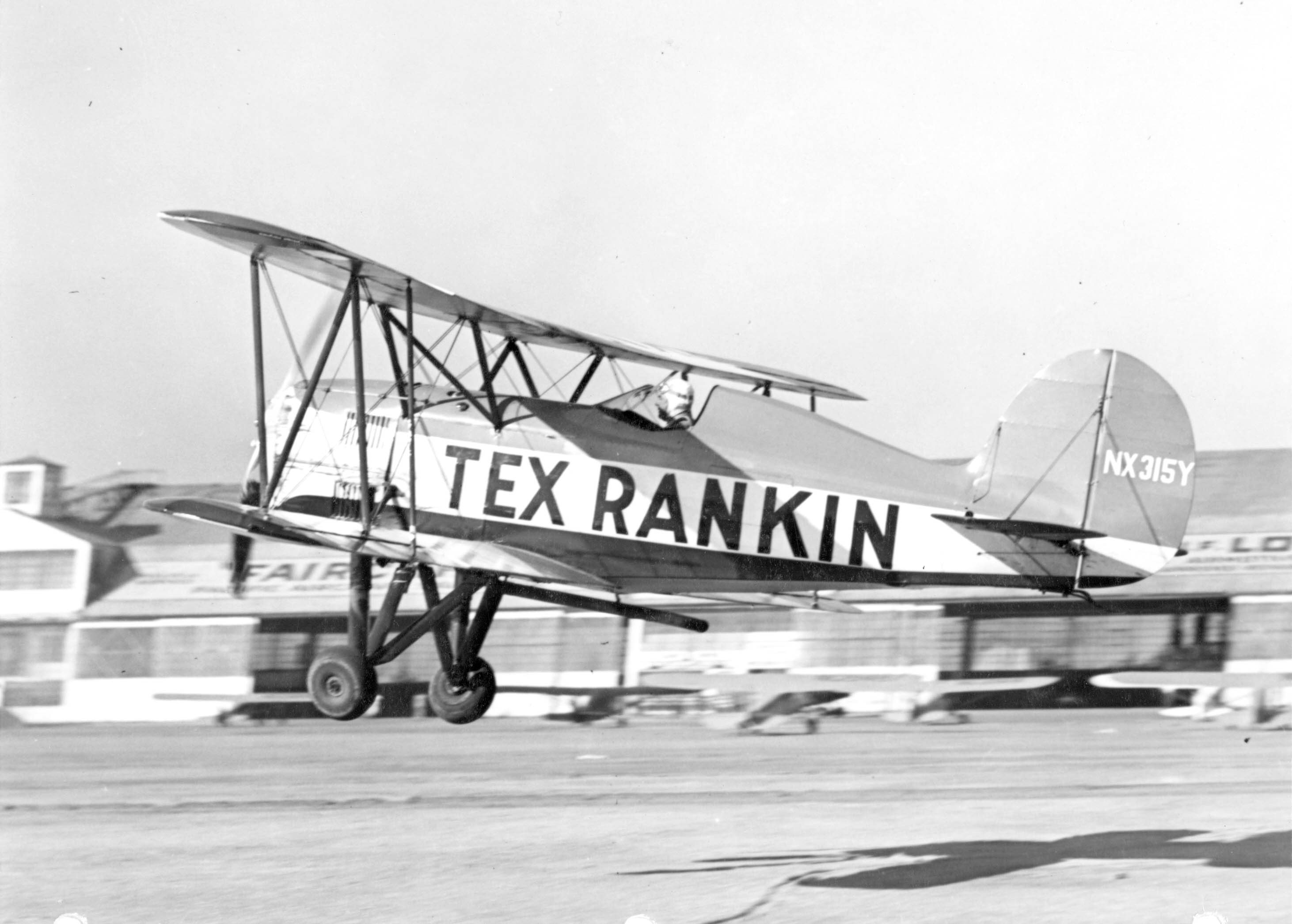
Tex Rankin in flight, 1939

After the war, Rankin remained in Tulare as President of Rankin Aviation Industries, where his company provided the sale and service of private planes, as well as crop dusting services. Rankin Aviation Industries also became the west coast distributor of the experimental amphibious plane, the Republic Aviation Seabee, of which Rankin himself became the first customer. Tex Rankin was killed in an aviation accident on February 23, 1947, in Klamath Falls, Oregon, when the Seabee he was piloting suffered a power failure upon takeoff and struck a 70-foot-high tension line which overturned the airplane. Two of Rankin's passengers on the business flight were killed and one was injured. He is buried in Tulare, California.

Rankin's Great Lakes Rankin Special Biplane, in which he set his world records, is on display at the Oregon Aviation Museum. Rankin has been selected into the Oregon Aviation Hall of Fame and the International Aerobatic Club Hall of Fame.
