= Your Cheatin' Heart =

1952 single by Hank Williams

- 1965 reissue single label

Single by Hank Williams With His Drifting Cowboys
- A-side: "Kaw-Liga"
- Published: October 31, 1952 Acuff-Rose Publications, Inc.
- Released: January 1953
- Recorded: September 23, 1952
- Studio: Castle Studio, Nashville
- Genre: Country & Western, Honky-tonk
- Length: 2:38
- Label: MGM K 11416-B
- Songwriter: Hank Williams
- Producer: Fred Rose

Hank Williams With His Drifting Cowboys singles chronology
"I'll Never Get Out of This World Alive" (1953)	"Your Cheatin' Heart" (1953)	"Take These Chains from My Heart" (1953)

Audio sample
- file; help

"Your Cheatin' Heart" is a song written and recorded by country music singer-songwriter Hank Williams in 1952. It is regarded as one of country's most important standards. Williams was inspired to write the song while driving with his fiancée from Nashville, Tennessee, to Shreveport, Louisiana. After describing his first wife Audrey Sheppard as a "cheatin' heart", in minutes he dictated the lyrics to Billie Jean Jones. Produced by Fred Rose, Williams recorded the song at his last session at Castle Studio in Nashville, Tennessee, on September 23.

"Your Cheatin' Heart" was released in January 1953. Propelled by Hank Williams' recent death during a trip to a New Year's concert in Canton, Ohio, the song became an instant success. It topped Billboard's Country & Western chart for six weeks, with over a million units sold. The success of the song continued with covers by other artists. Joni James' version reached number two on Billboard's Most Played in Jukeboxes the same year, while Ray Charles' 1962 version reached number 29 on the Billboard Hot 100 and 13 on the UK Singles Chart. The song ranked 213 on Rolling Stone's 500 Greatest Songs of All Time, and was ranked number 5 on Country Music Television's 100 Greatest Songs in Country Music.

== Background ==
By 1952, Williams was enjoying a successful streak, releasing multiple hits, including "Honky Tonk Blues", "Half as Much", "Settin' the Woods on Fire", "Jambalaya (On the Bayou)" and "You Win Again". While his career was soaring, his marriage to Audrey Sheppard became turbulent. Already a periodic alcoholic, he developed serious problems with morphine and painkillers prescribed to ease his severe back pain caused by an unsuccessful operation to relieve spina bifida. The couple divorced on May 29. Soon after, Williams met Billie Jean Jones backstage at the Ryman Auditorium, a native of Shreveport, Louisiana, who was, at the time, dating Faron Young. Williams started dating Jones, upon the end of her relationship with Young and soon began to plan their marriage. While driving from Nashville, Tennessee, to Shreveport to announce the wedding to her parents, Williams talked to her about his previous marriage and described Audrey Sheppard as a "cheatin' heart", adding that one day she would "have to pay". Inspired by his line, he instructed Jones to take his notebook and write down the lyrics of the song that he quickly dictated.

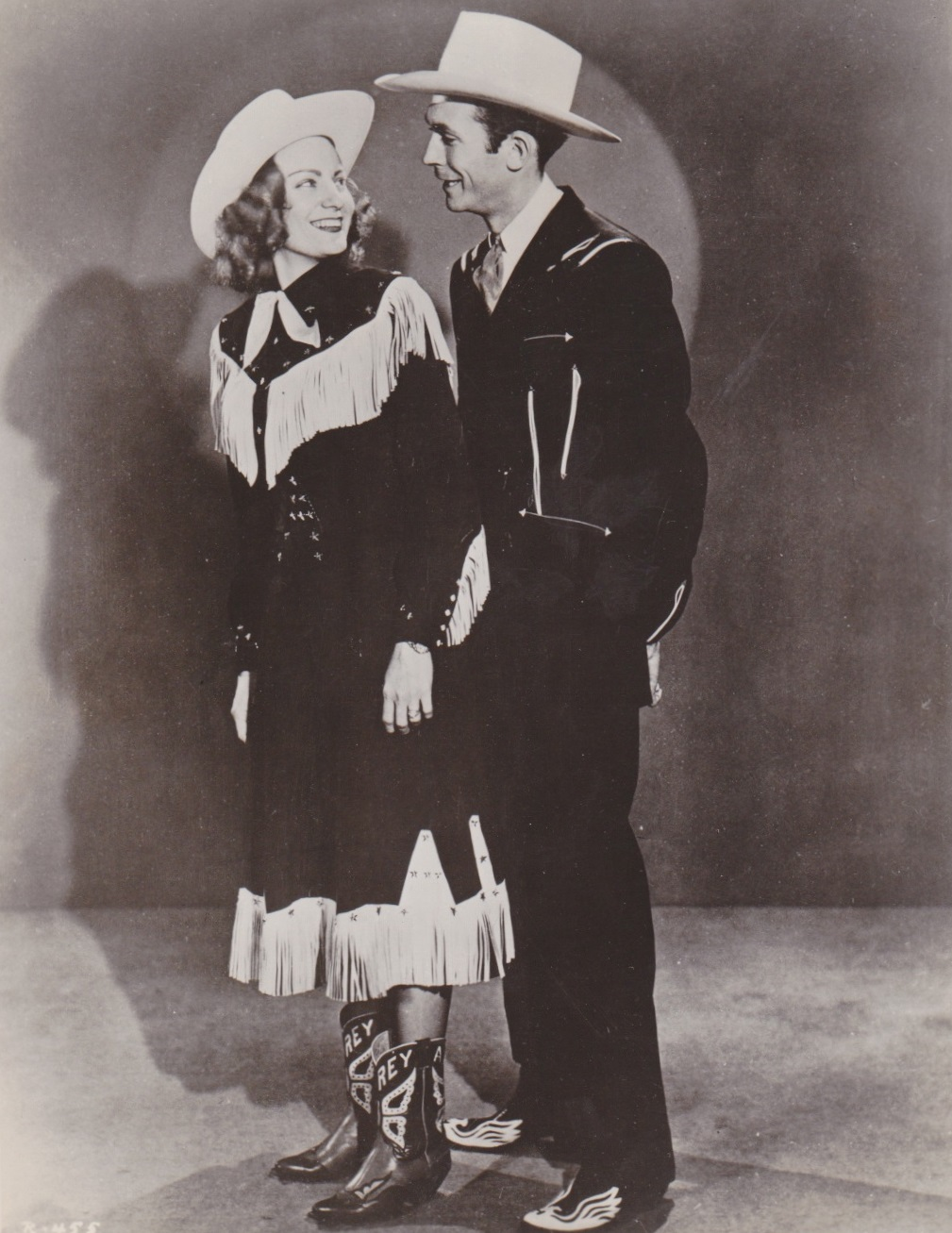
Hank and Audrey Williams, 1952

== Recording and release ==
Williams recorded the song on September 23 at the Castle Studio in Nashville. The session, which became Williams' last, also produced the A-side "Kaw-Liga", as well as the songs "I Could Never Be Ashamed of You" and "Take These Chains from My Heart". It was produced by Williams' publisher Fred Rose, who made minor arrangements of the lyrics of "Your Cheatin' Heart". Williams described the song to his friend, Braxton Schuffert, as he was about to play it, as "the best heart song (he) ever wrote". Williams is backed on the session by Tommy Jackson (fiddle), Don Helms (steel guitar), Chet Atkins (lead guitar), Jack Shook (rhythm guitar), and Floyd "Lightnin'" Chance (bass).

While traveling to a scheduled New Year's show in Canton, Ohio, the driver found Williams dead on the back seat of the car during a stop in Oak Hill, West Virginia. "Your Cheatin' Heart" was released at the end of January 1953. Propelled by Williams' death, the song and the A-side "Kaw-Liga" became a hit, selling over a million records. Billboard initially described the songs as "superlative tunes and performances", emphasizing the sales potential. Within a short time from its release, the song reached number one on Billboard's Top C&W Records, where it remained for six weeks.

== Legacy ==
Released in the wake of his death, the song became synonymous with the myth of Hank Williams as a haunted, lonely figure who expressed pain with an authenticity that became the standard for country music. The name of the song was used as the title of Hank Williams' 1964 biopic. "Your Cheatin' Heart", as well as other songs by Williams were performed on the movie, with George Hamilton dubbing the soundtrack album recorded by Williams' son, Hank Williams Jr. Country music historian Colin Escott wrote that "the song – for all intents and purposes – defines country music." In the 2003 documentary series Lost Highway, country music historian Ronnie Pugh comments, "It's Hank's anthem, it's his musical last will and testament. It's searing, it's powerful, it's gripping. If you want to say this is his last and best work, I wouldn't argue with that." AllMusic described the track as the "signature song" of Hank Williams, and an "unofficial anthem" of country music. Rolling Stone called it "one of the greatest country standards of all time", ranking it at number 217 on their list of the 500 Greatest Songs of All Time. The song ranked at number 5 in Country Music Television's 100 Greatest Songs in Country Music in 2003,

In 1983, the original recording released on the MGM label in 1953 was inducted into the Grammy Hall of Fame.

Two Pepsi Super Bowl commercials featured the song, one aired during Super Bowl XXX, featured Williams' recording while a Coca-Cola deliveryman grabbed a Pepsi. The second one, aired during Super Bowl XLVI, featured the same situation, but with the song covered by Jennifer Nettles of Sugarland. The song forms the title of the 1990 TV drama 'Your Cheatin' Heart' by John Byrne.

== Cover versions ==
- A version of the song by Joni James, released in 1953, reached number 2 on Billboard's Most Played in Jukeboxes.
- In 1953, Frankie Laine's version reached number 18 on the Most Played in Jukeboxes chart.
- In 1958, Elvis Presley recorded his version of this song. It has been included on several compilation collections.
- In 1962, a version by Ray Charles reached number 29 on the Billboard Hot 100 and 23 on the R&B chart, while it also charted at number 13 on the UK Singles Chart.
- In 1962, Patsy Cline released a version on her third and final studio album Sentimentally Yours. Cline's vocals were overdubbed over a different arrangement for the soundtrack to Cline's biographical movie Sweet Dreams.
- In 1961, Judy Howard released a 45 RPM version by the Heavenly Records label, with orchestra conducted by Larry Lucie.

== Chart performance ==
=== Hank Williams ===
Chart (1953)	Peak position
Top C&W Records	1

=== Cover versions ===
Year	Artist	Chart	Peak position
1953	Joni James	Billboard Most Played in Jukeboxes	2
1953	Frankie Laine	Billboard Most Played in Jukeboxes	18
1958	George Hamilton IV	Billboard Hot 100	72
1962	Ray Charles	Billboard Hot 100	29
1962	Ray Charles	Billboard Top R&B Singles	23
1962	Ray Charles	UK Singles Chart	13

== Bibliography ==
- Escott, Colin; Merritt, George; MacEwen, William (2004). Hank Williams: The Biography. New York: Little, Brown.
- Flippo, Chet (1985). Your Cheatin' Heart: A Biography of Hank Williams. Doubleday Publishing. ISBN 978-0-385-19737-3.
- Fox, Pamela (2009). Natural acts: gender, race, and rusticity in country music. University of Michigan Press. ISBN 978-0-472-07068-8.
- Geller, Wendy (2012). "Hear Jennifer Nettles Take On Hank Sr. Classic In Pepsi Max Commercial". Yahoo! Music. Yahoo, Inc.
- Helander, Brock (1998). The rockin' '50s: the people who made the music. Schirmer Books. ISBN 978-0-028-64872-9.
- Hischak, Thomas (2002). The Tin Pan Alley song encyclopedia. Greenwood Press. ISBN 978-0-313-31992-1.
- Houghtaling, Adam Brent (2012). This Will End in Tears: The Miserabilist Guide to Music. HarperCollins. ISBN 978-0-062-09896-2.
- Jennings, Dana (2008). Sing Me Back Home: Love, Death, and Country Music. Macmillan. ISBN 978-1-429-99624-2.
- Joyner, David Lee (2008). American Popular Music. McGraw-Hill Education. ISBN 978-0-073-52657-7.
- Kingsbury, Paul (2006). Will the circle be unbroken: country music in America. DK Publishing. ISBN 978-0-756-62352-4.
- Koda, Cub (2012). Your Cheatin' Heart. Rovi Corporation.
- Koon, George William (2002). Hank Williams, so Lonesome. University of Mississippi press. ISBN 978-1-57806-283-6.
- Pugh, Ronnie (1998). Ernest Tubb: The Texas Troubadour. Duke University Press. ISBN 978-0-822-32190-3.
- Riggs, Thomas (2006). Encyclopedia of major marketing campaigns. Vol. 2. Gale Books. ISBN 978-0-787-67356-7.
- Rhodes, Don (2008). Say it Loud!: My Memories of James Brown, Soul Brother Number 1. Globe Pequot. ISBN 978-1-59921-674-4.
- Rolling Stone staff (2004). "500 Greatest Songs of All Time". Rolling Stone. Wenner Media LLC.
- Rolling Stone staff (2011). "Your Cheatin' Heart". Rolling Stone. Wenner Media LLC. Archived from the original on June 19, 2012.
- Rotella, Mark (2010). Amore: The Story of Italian American Song. Macmillan. ISBN 978-1-429-97847-7.
- Tichi, Cecelia (1998). Reading country music: steel guitars, opry stars, and honky-tonk bars. Duke University Press. ISBN 978-0-822-32168-2.
- Tyler, Don (2008). Music of the post war era. ABC-Clio. ISBN 978-0-313-34191-5.
- Williams, Roger M. (1981). Sing a sad song: the life of Hank Williams. University of Illinois Press. ISBN 978-0-252-00861-0.
