= Death of Hank Williams =

1953 death of an American singer

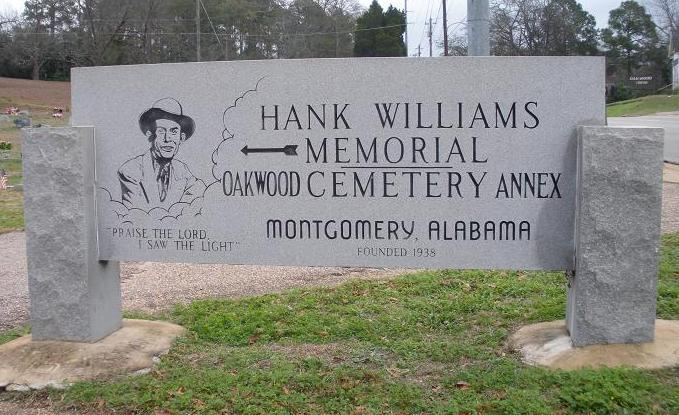
- Entrance marker of the Oakwood Annex Cemetery in Montgomery, Alabama
- Date: January 1, 1953; 73 years ago
- Location: Oak Hill, West Virginia
- Cause: Insufficiency of the right ventricle of the heart
- Burial: January 4, 1953, at Oakwood Annex Cemetery in Montgomery, Alabama
- Inquest: January 1, 1953, in Oak Hill, West Virginia
- Coroner: Ivan Malinin

Hiram "Hank" Williams died on January 1, 1953, near Oak Hill, West Virginia, United States, at the age of 29. Williams was an American singer-songwriter and musician regarded as one of the most significant country music artists of all time.

Williams was born with a mild undiagnosed case of spina bifida occulta, a disorder of the spinal column, which gave him lifelong pain—a factor in his later substance abuse. In 1951, Williams fell during a hunting trip in Tennessee, reactivating his old back pains and causing him to be dependent on alcohol and prescription drugs. This addiction eventually exacerbated his relationships with his first wife Audrey Williams and the Grand Ole Opry.

Williams was scheduled to perform at the Municipal Auditorium in Charleston, West Virginia, on December 31, 1952. The concert was cancelled due to an ice storm near Nashville, Tennessee, and he hired college student Charles Carr to drive him to an appearance the next day at the Canton Memorial Auditorium in Canton, Ohio. The two stopped at the Andrew Johnson Hotel in Knoxville, Tennessee, where Carr requested a doctor for Williams, who was feeling the combination of the chloral hydrate and alcohol he had consumed after departing from Montgomery, Alabama. The doctor injected Williams with two shots of vitamin B12 that contained morphine. Carr talked to Williams for the last time when they stopped at a restaurant in Bristol, Virginia, at around midnight. Carr later kept driving until he reached a gas station in Oak Hill, West Virginia, where he found Williams unresponsive in the back seat. After determining that Williams was dead, Carr asked for help from the owner of the gas station, who notified the police. After an autopsy, the cause of death was determined to be "insufficiency of the right ventricle of the heart."

Tributes to Williams took place the day after his death. His body was initially transported to Montgomery and placed in a silver coffin shown at his mother's boarding house. The funeral took place on January 4 at the Montgomery Auditorium, where an estimated 15,000 to 25,000 attended while the auditorium was filled with 2,750 mourners.

== Background ==
In 1951, Williams fell during a hunting trip in Tennessee, reactivating his old back pains caused by undiagnosed spina bifida occulta. Later, he started to consume alcohol and painkillers including morphine to ease the pain. His alcoholism worsened in 1952; in June, he divorced Audrey Williams and, on August 11, he was dismissed from the Grand Ole Opry for habitual drunkenness. He returned to perform in radio shows for KWKH and WBAM and in the Louisiana Hayride, for which he toured again. His performances were acclaimed when he was sober, but his abuse of alcohol resulted in occasions when he did not appear or his performances were poor. In October 1952, he married Billie Jean Jones.

Due to Williams's excesses, Fred Rose stopped working with him. The Drifting Cowboys, his former backing band, had left him to work with Ray Price, while Williams was backed by local bands. By the end of 1952, Williams had started to suffer heart problems. He met Horace Raphol "Toby" Marshall in Oklahoma City, who claimed to be a doctor. Marshall had been previously convicted for forgery, and had been paroled and released from the Oklahoma State Penitentiary in 1951. Among other fake titles, he claimed to be a Doctor of Science; he had purchased a fraudulent DSc for $35 (equivalent to $420 in 2025) from the "Chicago School of Applied Science". In the diploma, he requested that the DSc be spelled out as "Doctor of Science and Psychology". Under the name Dr. C. W. Lemon, he prescribed Williams with amphetamines, Seconal, chloral hydrate, and morphine.

Williams was scheduled to perform at the Municipal Auditorium in Charleston, West Virginia, on Wednesday, December 31, 1952. Advance ticket sales totaled $3,500 (equivalent to $42,000 in 2025). Because of an ice storm in the Nashville area that day, Williams could not fly, so he hired a college student, Charles Carr, to drive him to the concerts. Carr called the Charleston auditorium from Knoxville, Tennessee, to say that Williams would not arrive on time owing to the ice storm, and was ordered to drive him to Canton, Ohio, for the concert scheduled for January 1 at the Canton Memorial Auditorium. Williams and Carr departed from Montgomery, Alabama, at around 1:00 p.m.

== The final trip ==
Williams arrived at the Andrew Johnson Hotel in Knoxville, Tennessee, where Carr checked in at 7:08 p.m. and ordered two steaks to be delivered to their rooms from the hotel's restaurant. Carr also requested a doctor for Williams, as he was feeling the combination of the chloral hydrate and alcohol he had consumed on the way from Montgomery to Knoxville. Doctor P.H. Cardwell injected Williams with two shots of vitamin B12 that also contained a quarter-grain (16.2 mg) of morphine. Carr and Williams checked out of the hotel at around 10:45 p.m. Hotel porters had to carry Williams from the hotel to his vehicle, an Olympic Blue 1952 Cadillac Series 62 convertible, as he was coughing and hiccupping. At around midnight on January 1, 1953, Carr and Williams arrived in Bristol, Virginia.

Carr stopped at a small all-night restaurant in Bristol and he asked Williams if he wanted to eat. He said he did not, which are thought to be his last words. Carr drove on until he stopped for fuel at a gas station in Oak Hill, West Virginia, where he discovered Williams seemingly asleep in the back seat. He was unresponsive, and rigor mortis had already begun to set in. Carr immediately realized that he was dead and informed the filling station's owner, Glenn Burdette, who called the chief of the local police, O.H. Stamey. Because a corpse was involved, Stamey called in radio officer Howard Janney. Stamey and Janney found some empty beer cans and the unfinished handwritten lyrics to a song yet to be recorded in the Cadillac.

The town's coroner and mortician, Dr. Ivan Malinin, a Russian immigrant who barely spoke English, performed the autopsy on Williams at the Tyree Funeral House. Malinin found hemorrhages in the heart and neck and pronounced the cause of death as "insufficiency of [the] right ventricle of [the] heart." Malinin also found that, while apparently not contributing to his death, Williams had also been severely kicked in the groin during a fight in a Montgomery bar a few days earlier and had injured his left arm, which had been subsequently bandaged. That evening, when the announcer at Canton announced Williams's death to the gathered crowd, they started laughing, thinking that it was just another excuse for him not to perform. After Hawkshaw Hawkins and other performers started singing Williams's "I Saw the Light" as a tribute, the crowd, now realizing that he was indeed dead, followed them.

=== Controversy ===
The circumstances of Williams's death are still controversial. The original autopsy determined that Williams died of a heart attack. Williams biographer Colin Escott later concluded that the cause of death was heart failure due to the combination of alcohol, morphine, and chloral hydrate.

The investigating officer in Oak Hill declared later that Carr told him that he had pulled over at the Skyline Drive-In restaurant outside Oak Hill and found Williams dead. Having interviewed Carr, the best that Peter Cooper of The Tennessean could offer was that "somewhere between Mount Hope and Oak Hill", Carr noticed Williams' blanket had fallen off. "I saw that the overcoat and blanket that had been covering Hank had slipped off," Carr told another reporter. "When I pulled it back up, I noticed that his hand was stiff and cold." When he tried to move his hands, they snapped back to the same position the hotel porters had arranged him in. Carr told Cooper that this happened at the side of the road six miles from Oak Hill, but investigating officer Howard Janney placed it in the Skyline Drive-In restaurant's parking lot, noting that Carr sought help from a Skyline employee. Another researcher decided that it could have happened at any of the gas stations near Mount Hope.

Regardless, Carr said he next drove to "a cut-rate gas station". "I went inside and an older guy, around 50, came back out with me, looked in the back seat, and said, 'I think you've got a problem'. He was very kind, and said Oak Hill General Hospital was six miles on my left." They later drove to Oak Hill in search of a hospital, stopping at a Pure Oil station on the edge of town. Carr's account of how he discovered that Williams was dead outside Oak Hill is challenged by Dr. Leo Killorn, a Canadian intern at Beckley hospital, West Virginia, fifteen miles from Oak Hill, who claims that Carr drove up to the hospital and asked him to see Williams. Killorn stated that the fact that Carr told him it was Hank Williams caused him to remember the incident. Carr was exhausted and, according to the police reports, nervous enough to invite suspicion that foul play had been involved in Williams' death.

== Funeral ==
Williams's body was transported to Montgomery, Alabama, on January 2. He was placed in a silver coffin that was first shown at his mother's boarding house at 318 McDounough Street for two days. His funeral took place on January 4 at the Montgomery Auditorium, (Note: The Montgomery Auditorium, located at the intersection of Perry and Monroe Street, was renovated in 2011 to serve as Montgomery's city hall.) with his coffin placed on the flower-covered stage. During the ceremony, Ernest Tubb sang "Beyond the Sunset", followed by Roy Acuff with "I Saw the Light" and Red Foley with "Peace in the Valley". An estimated 15,000 to 25,000 people passed by the silver coffin, and the auditorium was filled with 2,750 mourners. During the funeral four women fainted and a fifth was carried out of the auditorium in hysterics after falling at the foot of the casket. His funeral was said to have been far larger than any ever held for any other citizen of Alabama, and the largest event ever held in Montgomery, surpassing Jefferson Davis' inauguration as President of the Confederate States of America. Around two tons of flowers were sent to the funeral. Williams's remains are interred at the Oakwood Cemetery Annex in Montgomery.

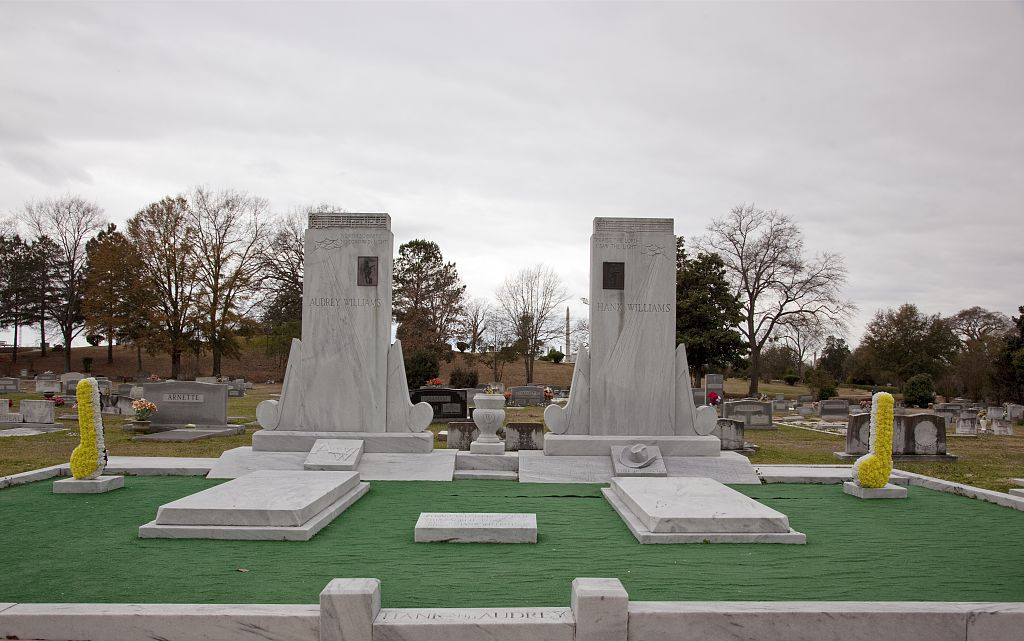
Grave of Audrey (left) and Hank Williams (right) at Oakwood Annex Cemetery

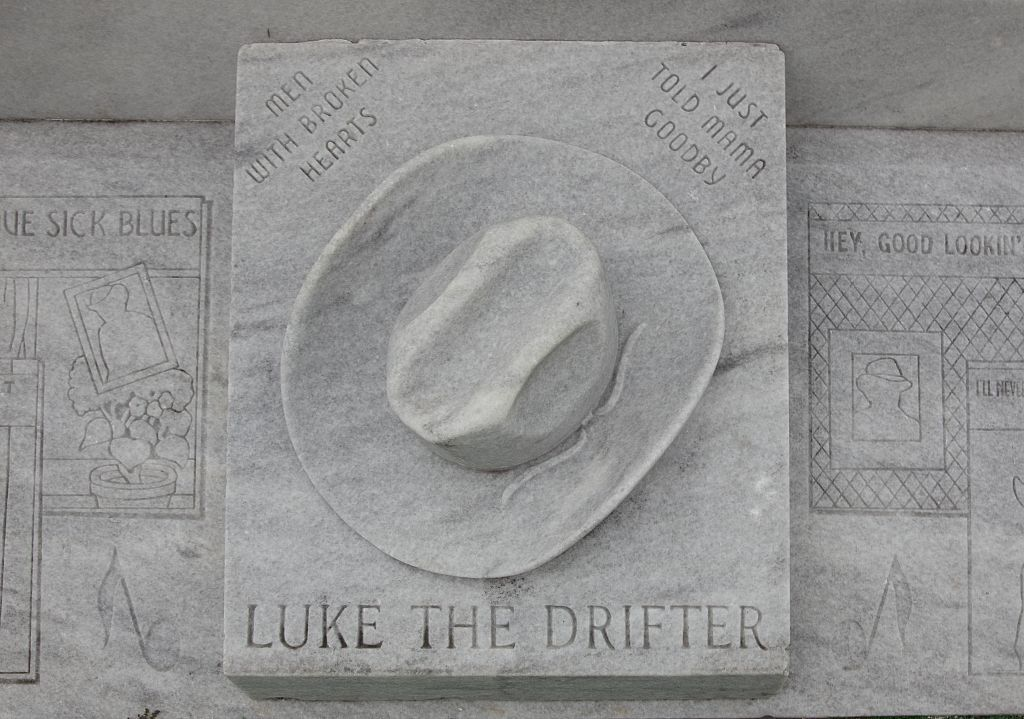
Hank Williams's tombstone

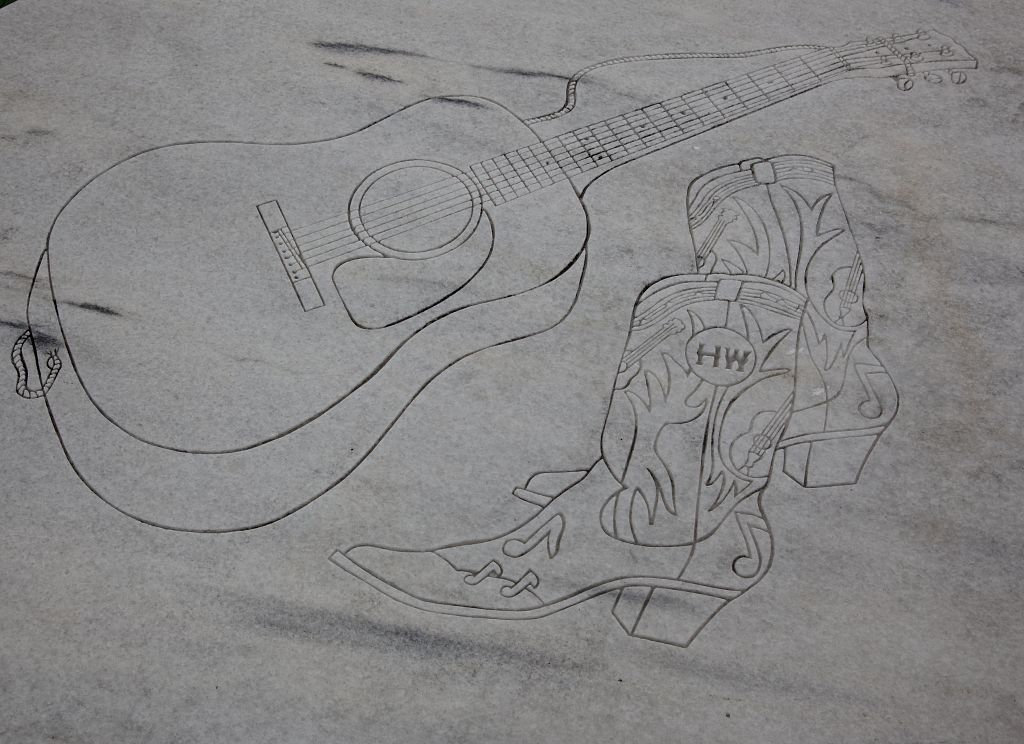
Hank Williams's grave

== Aftermath ==
The president of Metro-Goldwyn-Mayer told Billboard magazine that the company got only about five requests for pictures of Williams during the weeks prior to his death, but over 300 afterwards. The local record shops sold out of all of their Hank Williams records, and customers were asking for all records ever released by Williams. His final single released during his lifetime was ironically titled "I'll Never Get Out of This World Alive". "Your Cheatin' Heart", released posthumously in late January, hit number one on the country charts for six weeks. It also provided the title for the 1964 biographical film of the same name, which starred George Hamilton. The Cadillac in which Williams was riding when he died is now preserved at the Hank Williams Museum in Montgomery.

=== Oklahoma investigation of Horace Marshall ===
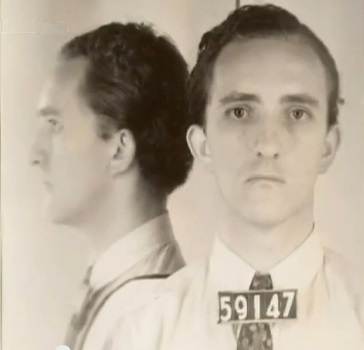
Mugshot of Horace "Toby" Marshall

As part of an investigation of illicit drug trafficking conducted by the Oklahoma Legislature, state representative Robert Cunningham seized Horace Marshall's files. During an initial hearing, Marshall insisted that he was a doctor, refusing to answer further statements. Marshall gave Cunningham a list of his patients, including Williams. Marshall claimed that Williams had possibly committed suicide, and that he had declared his intent to "destroy the Hank Williams that was making the money they were getting". Marshall attributed the decision to Williams's declining career: "Most of his bookings were of the honky-tonk beer joint variety that he simply hated. If he came to this conclusion (of suicide), he still had enough prestige left as a star to make a first-class production of it ... whereas, six months from now, unless he pulled himself back up into some high-class bookings, he might have been playing for nickels and dimes on skid row."

On March 10, Marshall was called again to testify. He acknowledged that in previous testimony he had falsely claimed to be a physician. Representative Cunningham presented the committee a telegram from Marshall's seized files, directed to the estate of Hank Williams for $736.39 (equivalent to $8,861.41 in 2025), and stated that the committee was evaluating the revocation of Marshall's parole. On March 12, 1953, Billie Jean Jones appeared before the Oklahoma committee. She stated that she received after Williams's death a bill for $800 (equivalent to $9,700 in 2025) from Marshall for the treatment. Jones refused to pay, and further stated that Marshall later intended to convince her to pay him by assuring that he would "pave her the way to collect her husband's state". Jones declared that "I have never accepted the report that my husband died of a heart attack."

On March 19, Marshall declared that he felt Williams was depressed and committed suicide by overdosing on drugs he had prescribed. Marshall admitted that he had also prescribed chloral hydrate to his recently deceased wife Faye as a headache medicine, but denied any responsibility in either death. On March 21, Robert Travis of the State Crime Bureau determined that Marshall's handwriting corresponded to that of "Dr. Cecil W. Lemmon" on six prescriptions written for Williams. The same day, the District Attorney's office declared that after a new review of the autopsy report of Faye, toxicological and microscopic tests confirmed that her death on March 3 was not related to the medication prescribed by her husband. Governor Johnston Murray revoked the parole of Marshall, who returned to prison to complete his forgery sentence.
