= Never Ending Tour 1990 =

1990 concert tour by Bob Dylan

- Tour by Bob Dylan
- Poster to the concert in Nashville, USA
- Start date: January 12, 1990
- End date: November 18, 1990
- Legs: 5
- No. of shows: 72 in North America; 2 in South America; 19 in Europe; 93 in Total

Bob Dylan concert chronology
- Never Ending Tour 1989 (1989); Never Ending Tour 1990 (1990); Never Ending Tour 1991 (1991)

Bob Dylan performed 93 shows in 1990 as part of what is popularly known as the Never Ending Tour.

== Background ==
The Never Ending Tour 1990 started off with a tour called the Fastbreak tour where Dylan performed in the United States, Brazil, France and England in less than thirty days. This tour started off with a one-off performance at Toad's Place in New Haven Connecticut. Dylan performed four sets that evening and performed a total of fifty songs; this was also the longest of Dylan's concerts to date. During the tour Dylan also performed four concerts in Paris and six sold out concerts at the Hammersmith Apollo in London, England.

On May 29, Dylan started a sixteen date tour of Canada and the United States, ten of the concerts took place in Canada.

After finishing his short North American tour Dylan embarked on an even shorter European tour. This tour only comprised nine concerts, several of which were major concert appearances, including the Roskilde Festival in Denmark, Rock Werchter in Belgium and the Montreux Jazz Festival in Switzerland.

Dylan returned to North America to perform a twenty-three date late summer tour of the United States and Canada including several appearances at state fairs. The tour started on August 12 in Edmonton, Alberta, Canada and came to an end a month later on September 12 in Mesa, Arizona. Dylan performed in a total of twenty cities in fourteen states and provinces.

Dylan started his final tour of the year on October 11 in Brookville, New York. This tour consisted of thirty concerts in the United States. During the roué Dylan performed a five night run at the Beacon Theatre in New York City. The tour finally came to a close on November 18 at the Fox Theatre in Detroit, Michigan, after ninety-three concerts.

== Tour dates ==
Date	City	Country	Venue	Attendance	Box Office
The Fastbreak Tour
January 12, 1990	New Haven	United States	Toad's Place	—	—
January 14, 1990	University Park	United States	Rec Hall	—	—
January 15, 1990	Princeton	United States	McCarter Theatre	—	—
January 18, 1990	São Paulo	Brazil	Estádio do Morumbi	—	—
January 25, 1990	Rio de Janeiro	Brazil	Praça da Apoteose	—	—
January 29, 1990	Paris	France	Grand Rex	—	—
January 30, 1990	Paris	France	Grand Rex	—	—
January 31, 1990	Paris	France	Grand Rex	—	—
February 1, 1990	Paris	France	Grand Rex	—	—
February 3, 1990	London	England	Hammersmith Odeon	—	—
February 4, 1990	London	England	Hammersmith Odeon	—	—
February 5, 1990	London	England	Hammersmith Odeon	—	—
February 6, 1990	London	England	Hammersmith Odeon	—	—
February 7, 1990	London	England	Hammersmith Odeon	—	—
February 8, 1990	London	England	Hammersmith Odeon	—	—
North America
May 29, 1990	Montreal	Canada	Université de Montréal Centre Sportif	—	—
May 30, 1990	Kingston	Canada	Kingston Memorial Centre	—	—
June 1, 1990	Ottawa	Canada	National Arts Centre	—	—
June 2, 1990	Ottawa	Canada	National Arts Centre	—	—
June 4, 1990	London	Canada	Alumni Hall	—	—
June 5, 1990	Toronto	Canada	O'Keefe Centre	9,071 / 9,071	$265,336
June 6, 1990	Toronto	Canada	O'Keefe Centre	9,071 / 9,071	$265,336
June 7, 1990	Toronto	Canada	O'Keefe Centre	9,071 / 9,071	$265,336
June 9, 1990	East Troy	United States	Alpine Valley Music Theatre	13,712 / 30,000	$208,054
June 10, 1990	Davenport	United States	Adler Theater	—	—
June 12, 1990	La Crosse	United States	La Crosse Center	—	—
June 13, 1990	Sioux Falls	United States	Sioux Falls Arena	—	—
June 14, 1990	Fargo	United States	Fargo Civic Center	—	—
June 15, 1990	Bismarck	United States	Bismarck Civic Center	—	—
June 17, 1990	Winnipeg	Canada	Centennial Concert Hall	—	—
June 18, 1990	Winnipeg	Canada	Centennial Concert Hall	—	—
Europe
June 27, 1990	Reykjavík	Iceland	Laugardalshöll	—	—
June 29, 1990 (Note: The June 29, 1990, concert in Roskilde was part of Roskilde Festival.)	Roskilde	Denmark	Roskilde Dyrskueplads	—	—
June 30, 1990 (Note: The June 30, 1990, concert in Kalvøya was part of Kalvøyafestivalen.)	Kalvøya	Norway	Kalvøya	—	—
July 1, 1990 (Note: The July 1, 1990, concert in Turku was part of Ruisrock.)	Turku	Finland	Ruissalon Kansanpuisto	—	—
July 3, 1990	Hamburg	West Germany	Hamburg Stadtpark	—	—
July 5, 1990	West Berlin	West Germany	ICC Berlin	—	—
July 7, 1990 (Note: The July 7, 1990, concert in Torhout was part of Rock Torhout.)	Torhout	Belgium	Festivalpark Torhout	—	—
July 8, 1990 (Note: The July 8, 1990, concert in Werchter was part of Rock Werchter.)	Werchter	Belgium	Werchter Festival Grounds	—	—
July 9, 1990 (Note: The July 9, 1990, concert in Montreux was part of Montreux Jazz Festival.)	Montreux	Switzerland	Montreux Casino	—	—
North America
August 12, 1990	Edmonton	Canada	Northern Alberta Jubilee Auditorium	—	—
August 13, 1990	Edmonton	Canada	Northern Alberta Jubilee Auditorium	—	—
August 15, 1990	Calgary	Canada	Southern Alberta Jubilee Auditorium	—	—
August 16, 1990	Calgary	Canada	Southern Alberta Jubilee Auditorium	—	—
August 18, 1990	George	United States	Champs de Brionne Music Theater	—	—
August 19, 1990	Victoria	Canada	Victoria Memorial Arena	—	—
August 20, 1990	Vancouver	Canada	Pacific Coliseum	—	—
August 21, 1990	Portland	United States	Arlene Schnitzer Concert Hall	—	—
August 24, 1990 (Note: The August 24, 1990, concert in Pueblo, Colorado, was part of the Colorado State Fair.)	Pueblo	United States	Colorado State Fair Events Center	—	—
August 26, 1990 (Note: The August 26, 1990, concert in Des Moines, Iowa, was part of the Iowa State Fair.)	Des Moines	United States	Iowa State Fairgrounds	—	—
August 27, 1990	Merrillville	United States	Holiday Star Theatre	—	—
August 28, 1990	Merrillville	United States	Holiday Star Theatre	—	—
August 29, 1990 (Note: The August 29, 1990, concert in Falcon Heights, Minnesota, was part of the Minnesota State Fair.)	Falcon Heights	United States	Minnesota State Fairgrounds	14,777 / 20,935	$156,125
August 31, 1990 (Note: The August 31, 1990, concert in Lincoln, Nebraska, was part of the Nebraska State Fair.)	Lincoln	United States	Bob Devaney Sports Center	—	—
September 1, 1990	Lampe	United States	Swiss Villa Amphitheater	—	—
September 2, 1990	Hannibal	United States	Riverfront Theater	—	—
September 4, 1990	Tulsa	United States	Riverpark Amphitheater	—	—
September 5, 1990	Oklahoma City	United States	Civic Center Music Hall	—	—
September 6, 1990	Dallas	United States	Music Hall at Fair Park	—	—
September 8, 1990	San Antonio	United States	Sunken Garden Theater	6,000 / 6,000	$102,104
September 9, 1990	Austin	United States	Palmer Events Center	—	—
September 11, 1990	Santa Fe	United States	Paolo Soleri Amphitheater	—	—
September 12, 1990	Mesa	United States	Mesa Amphitheatre	—	—
October 11, 1990	Brookville	United States	Tilles Performing Arts Center	—	—
October 12, 1990	Springfield	United States	Paramount Theater	—	—
October 13, 1990	West Point	United States	Eisenhower Hall Theater	—	—
October 15, 1990	New York City	United States	Beacon Theatre	13,555 / 13,555	$399,240
October 16, 1990	New York City	United States	Beacon Theatre	13,555 / 13,555	$399,240
October 17, 1990	New York City	United States	Beacon Theatre	13,555 / 13,555	$399,240
October 18, 1990	New York City	United States	Beacon Theatre	13,555 / 13,555	$399,240
October 19, 1990	New York City	United States	Beacon Theatre	13,555 / 13,555	$399,240
October 21, 1990	Richmond	United States	The Mosque	—	—
October 22, 1990	Pittsburgh	United States	Syria Mosque	—	—
October 23, 1990	Charleston	United States	Charleston Municipal Auditorium	—	—
October 25, 1990	Oxford	United States	Tad Smith Coliseum	—	—
October 26, 1990	Tuscaloosa	United States	Coleman Coliseum	—	—
October 27, 1990	Nashville	United States	War Memorial Auditorium	—	—
October 28, 1990	Athens	United States	Stegeman Coliseum	—	—
October 30, 1990	Boone	United States	Varsity Gymnasium	—	—
October 31, 1990	Charlotte	United States	Ovens Auditorium	—	—
November 2, 1990	Lexington	United States	Memorial Coliseum	—	—
November 3, 1990	Carbondale	United States	SIU Arena	—	—
November 4, 1990	St. Louis	United States	Fox Theatre	—	—
November 6, 1990	DeKalb	United States	Chick Evans Field House	—	—
November 8, 1990	Iowa City	United States	Carver–Hawkeye Arena	—	—
November 9, 1990	Chicago	United States	Fox Theatre	3,732 / 3,732	$89,065
November 10, 1990	Milwaukee	United States	Riverside Theater	—	—
November 12, 1990	East Lansing	United States	Wharton Center for Performing Arts	—	—
November 13, 1990	Dayton	United States	University of Dayton Arena	—	—
November 14, 1990	Normal	United States	Braden Auditorium	—	—
November 16, 1990	Columbus	United States	Columbus Palace Theatre	—	—
November 17, 1990	Cleveland	United States	Cleveland Music Hall	—	—
November 18, 1990	Detroit	United States	Fox Theatre	4,200 / 4,600	$98,550
