= Lost on the River =

1948 song by Hank Williams and Audrey Williams

Single by Hank Williams and Audrey Williams
- A-side: "Dear Brother"
- Recorded: December 22, 1948, Herzog Studio, Cincinnati
- Genre: Country
- Length: 2:36
- Label: MGM
- Songwriter(s): Hank Williams
- Producer(s): Fred Rose

"Lost on the River" is a song written by Hank Williams. It was released as a duet with his wife Audrey Williams on MGM Records in 1950.
