= Never Ending Tour 1991 =

1991 concert tour by Bob Dylan

- Tour by Bob Dylan
- Poster to the concert in Austin, USA
- Start date: January 28, 1991
- End date: November 20, 1991
- Legs: 6
- No. of shows: 33 in Europe; 59 in North America; 9 in South America; 101 in Total

Bob Dylan concert chronology
- Never Ending Tour 1990 (1990); Never Ending Tour 1991 (1991); Never Ending Tour 1992 (1992)

The Never Ending Tour is the popular name for Bob Dylan's endless touring schedule since June 7, 1988.

== Background ==
The Never Ending Tour 1991 started with The Second Fastbreak Tour starting in late January. The tour started in the reverse of the original Fastbreak Tour, in the first tour Dylan started in North America and moved to Europe but in the 1991 tour Dylan started in Europe and finished in North America. The tour started in Zurich, Switzerland, Dylan's first concert in the country. The tour then moved through Belgium, the Netherlands and Northern Ireland. Dylan then performed an eight show residency at Hammersmith Odeon in London. This was the first time that Dylan had performed at the legendary Hammersmith Odeon. The tour finished on March 2 in Mexico City.

On April 19 Dylan started a seventeen-date concert tour of the United States. The tour started in New Orleans, Louisiana and came to an end May 12 in Amherst, Massachusetts.

Dylan returned to Europe in early June. The tour started with three concerts in Italy. On June 10 and 11 Bob performed two concerts in Yugoslavia, his first and last concerts there as the country would break–up the following year. Dylan then performed two concerts in Austria before performing six concerts in Germany. Dylan then performed two concerts in Stockholm, Sweden and then the tour came to an end with a performance at Kalvøya–Festivalen on June 28 and a performance at Midtfyns Festival the following day.

After finishing his European summer tour Dylan returned to North America to perform fourteen concerts in the United States and one in Canada. He then travelled to South America with the band to perform nine concerts, five of which were in Brazil, three in Argentina and one concert in Uruguay. Dylan continued his North American tour on October 24 in Corpus Christi, Texas. The tour continued through the Southern and Eastern United States coming to an end in Charlottesville, Virginia on November 20.

== Shows ==
Date	City	Country	Venue
The One Sad Cry of Pity Tour
January 28, 1991	Zürich	Switzerland	Hallenstadion
January 30, 1991	Brussels	Belgium	Forest National
January 31, 1991	Utrecht	Netherlands	Muziekcentrum Vredenburg
February 2, 1991	Glasgow	Scotland	Scottish Exhibition and Conference Centre
February 3, 1991	Glasgow	Scotland	Scottish Exhibition and Conference Centre
February 5, 1991	Dublin	Ireland	Point Depot
February 6, 1991	Belfast	Northern Ireland	Dundonald International Ice Bowl
February 8, 1991	London	England	Hammersmith Apollo
February 9, 1991	London	England	Hammersmith Apollo
February 10, 1991	London	England	Hammersmith Apollo
February 12, 1991	London	England	Hammersmith Apollo
February 13, 1991	London	England	Hammersmith Apollo
February 15, 1991	London	England	Hammersmith Apollo
February 16, 1991	London	England	Hammersmith Apollo
February 17, 1991	London	England	Hammersmith Apollo
February 21, 1991	Williamsport	United States	Capitol Theater
February 22, 1991	Owings Mills	United States	Painter's Mill Music Theater
February 24, 1991	Guadalajara	Mexico	Hospicio Cabañas
February 25, 1991	Guadalajara	Mexico	Hospicio Cabañas
March 1, 1991	Mexico City	Mexico	Palacio de los Deportes
March 2, 1991	Mexico City	Mexico	Palacio de los Deportes
North America
April 19, 1991	New Orleans	United States	Saenger Performing Arts Center
April 20, 1991	Pelham	United States	Oak Mountain Amphitheater
April 21, 1991	Greenville	United States	Greenville Memorial Auditorium
April 23, 1991	Atlanta	United States	Fox Theatre
April 24, 1991	Macon	United States	Macon City Auditorium
April 25, 1991	Charleston	United States	King Street Palace
April 27, 1991	Miami	United States	Sunrise Musical Theater
April 30, 1991	Savannah	United States	Savannah Civic Center
May 1, 1991	Columbia	United States	Columbia Township Auditorium
May 2, 1991	Salem	United States	Salem Civic Center
May 4, 1991	Winston-Salem	United States	Lawrence Joel Veterans Memorial Coliseum
May 5, 1991	Raleigh	United States	Raleigh Memorial Auditorium
May 7, 1991	Stony Brook	United States	Stony Brook University
May 8, 1991	Albany	United States	Palace Theatre
May 9, 1991	Boston	United States	Matthews Arena
May 11, 1991	Danbury	United States	Charles Ives Center
May 12, 1991	Amherst	United States	Campus Pond
Europe
June 6, 1991	Rome	Italy	PalaEur
June 7, 1991	Bologna	Italy	Arena del Sole
June 8, 1991	Milan	Italy	Palatrussardi Di Milano
June 10, 1991	Ljubljana	Yugoslavia	Central Stadium Bežigrad
June 11, 1991	Belgrade	Yugoslavia	Zemun Stadium
June 12, 1991	Budapest	Hungary	Kisstadion
June 14, 1991	Innsbruck	Austria	Olympiahalle Innsbruck
June 15, 1991	Linz	Austria	Linz Sporthalle
June 17, 1991	Stuttgart	Germany	Kongresszentrum Liederhalle
June 18, 1991	Essen	Germany	Grugahalle
June 19, 1991	Offenbach	Germany	Stadthalle Offenbach
June 21, 1991	Munich	Germany	Circus Krone
June 22, 1991	Bad Mergentheim	Germany	Schloss Mergentheim
June 23, 1991	Hamburg	Germany	Hamburg Stadtpark
June 25, 1991	Stockholm	Sweden	Cirkus
June 26, 1991	Stockholm	Sweden	Cirkus
June 28, 1991^{[A]}	Sandvika	Norway	Kalvøya
June 29, 1991^{[B]}	Funen	Denmark	The Funen Village
North America
July 4, 1991	Lenox	United States	Tanglewood Music Shed
July 5, 1991	Mansfield	United States	Great Woods Center for the Performing Arts
July 6, 1991	Nashua	United States	Holman Stadium
July 9, 1991^{[C]}	Syracuse	United States	Empire Expo Center
July 10, 1991	Essex Junction	United States	The Champlain Valley Expo
July 11, 1991	Wantagh	United States	Jones Beach Theater
July 13, 1991	Holmdel	United States	Garden State Arts Centre
July 16, 1991	Pittsburgh	United States	IC Light Amphitheater
July 17, 1991	Cleveland	United States	Nautica Pavilion
July 19, 1991	Vienna	United States	Filene Center
July 20, 1991	Vienna	United States	Filene Center
July 21, 1991	Doswell	United States	Kings Dominion
July 24, 1991	Groton	United States	Thames River Pavilion
July 26, 1991	Vaughan	Canada	Kingswood Music Theatre
July 27, 1991	Corfu	United States	Lakeside Amphitheater
South America
August 8, 1991	Buenos Aires	Argentina	Estadio Obras Sanitarias
August 9, 1991	Buenos Aires	Argentina	Estadio Obras Sanitarias
August 10, 1991	Buenos Aires	Argentina	Estadio Obras Sanitarias
August 12, 1991	Montevideo	Uruguay	Cilindro Municipal
August 14, 1991	Porto Alegre	Brazil	Gigantinho
August 16, 1991	São Paulo	Brazil	Theatro Municipal
August 17, 1991	São Paulo	Brazil	Theatro Municipal
August 20, 1991	Belo Horizonte	Brazil	Mineirinho
August 21, 1991	Rio de Janeiro	Brazil	Imperator
North America
October 24, 1991	Corpus Christi	United States	Bayfront Auditorium
October 25, 1991	Austin	United States	Austin City Coliseum
October 26, 1991	San Antonio	United States	Sunken Garden Amphitheater
October 27, 1991	Lubbock	United States	Lubbock Memorial Civic Center
October 30, 1991	Tulsa	United States	Brady Theater
October 31, 1991	Wichita	United States	Wichita Civic Center
November 1, 1991	Kansas City	United States	Midland Theatre
November 2, 1991	Ames	United States	Stevens Auditorium
November 4, 1991	Evanston	United States	Welsh-Ryan Arena
November 5, 1991	Madison	United States	Dane County Coliseum
November 6, 1991	South Bend	United States	Morris Performing Arts Center
November 8, 1991	Louisville	United States	Whitney Hall
November 9, 1991	Dayton	United States	Memorial Hall
November 10, 1991	Indianapolis	United States	Murat Temple
November 12, 1991	Detroit	United States	Fox Theatre
November 13, 1991	Akron	United States	E. J. Thomas Hall
November 15, 1991	Easton	United States	F.M. Kirby Center
November 16, 1991	New Haven	United States	Woolsey Hall
November 18, 1991	Utica	United States	Stanley Theater
November 19, 1991	Erie	United States	Warner Theatre
November 20, 1991	Charlottesville	United States	Virginia University Hall

Festivals and other miscellaneous performances
^{A} This concert was a part of "Kalvøya-Festivalen"
^{B} This concert was a part of "Midtfyns Festival"
^{C} This concert was a part of "Great New York State Fair"
