= Dear Brother (song) =

Single by Hank Williams & Audrey Williams
- B-side: "Lost on the River"
- Released: May 1949
- Recorded: March 1, 1949
- Studio: Castle Studio, Nashville
- Genre: Country
- Length: 2:36
- Label: MGM 10434
- Songwriters: Hank Williams, Juanita Acuff
- Producer: Fred Rose

"Dear Brother" is a duet by Hank Williams and Audrey Williams. It was released by MGM Records in 1949. They recorded it with Fred Rose producing at Castle Studio in Nashville on March 1, 1949, and were backed by Dale Potter (fiddle), Don Davis (Steel guitar), Zeke Turner (Lead guitar), Clyde Baum (Mandolin), Jack Shook (Rhythm guitar), and probably Ernie Newton (bass). Audrey was six months pregnant at the time of the recording. By February 1950 it had sold 739 copies.

== Bibliography ==
- Escott, Colin (2004). Hank Williams: The Biography. Back Bay. ISBN 0-316-73497-7.
