= Zemun Stadium =

Stadium in Belgrade, Serbia

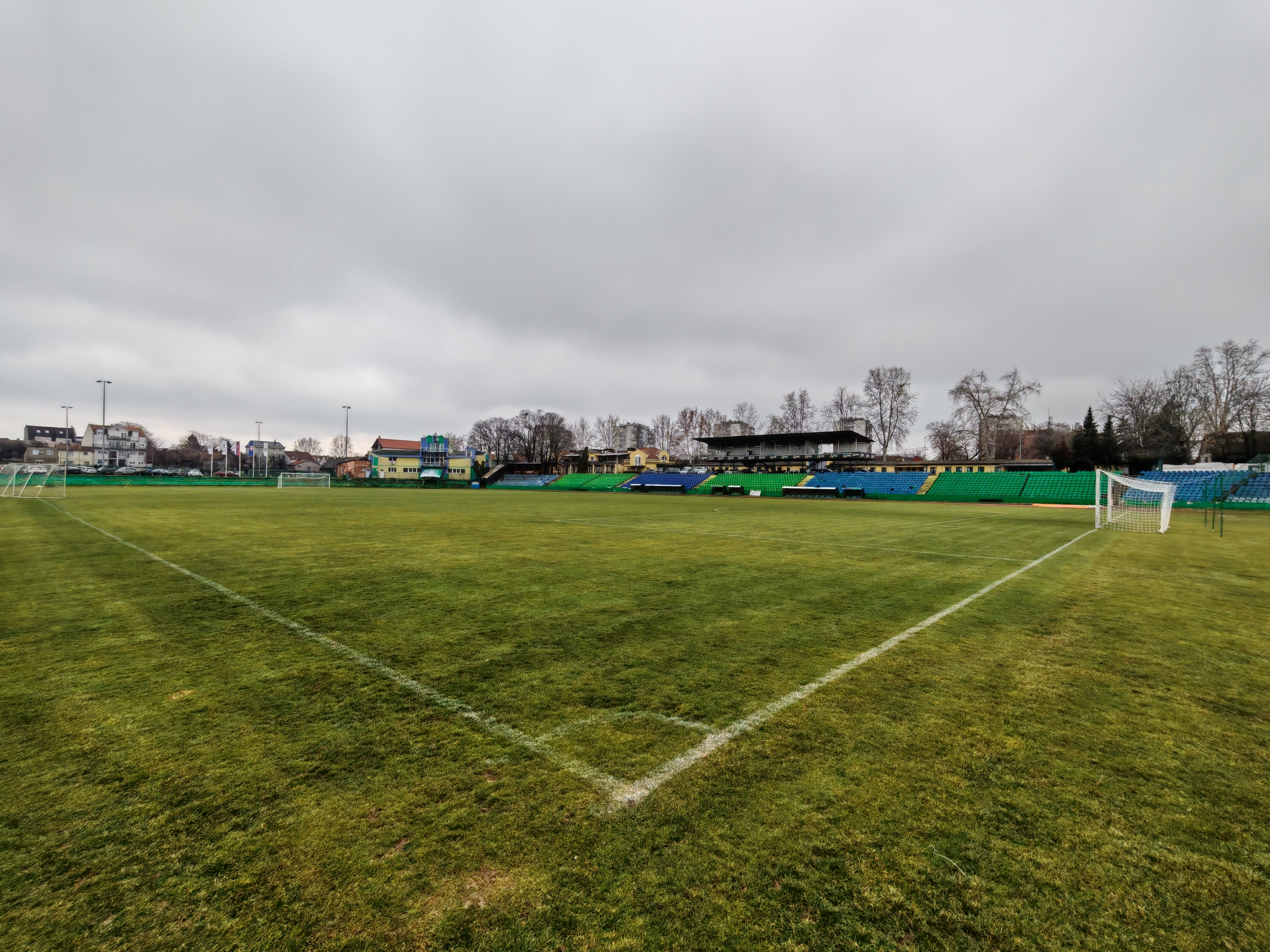
- View on the football pitch of Zemun Stadium from the northwestern corner, February 2026

- Location within Belgrade
- Location: Zemun, Belgrade, Serbia
- Coordinates: 44°50′52.59″N 20°23′52.70″E
- Capacity: 9,600
- Surface: Grass
- Scoreboard: LED

Construction
- Opened: 29 September 1962; 63 years ago

Tenants
- FK Zemun (1962–present); AK Mladost Zemun (1962–present)

Zemun Stadium is a multi-purpose stadium located in Zemun, Belgrade, Serbia. With the capacity of 9,600 seats, it is used primarily for football games, and is the home ground of FK Zemun.

== Gallery ==
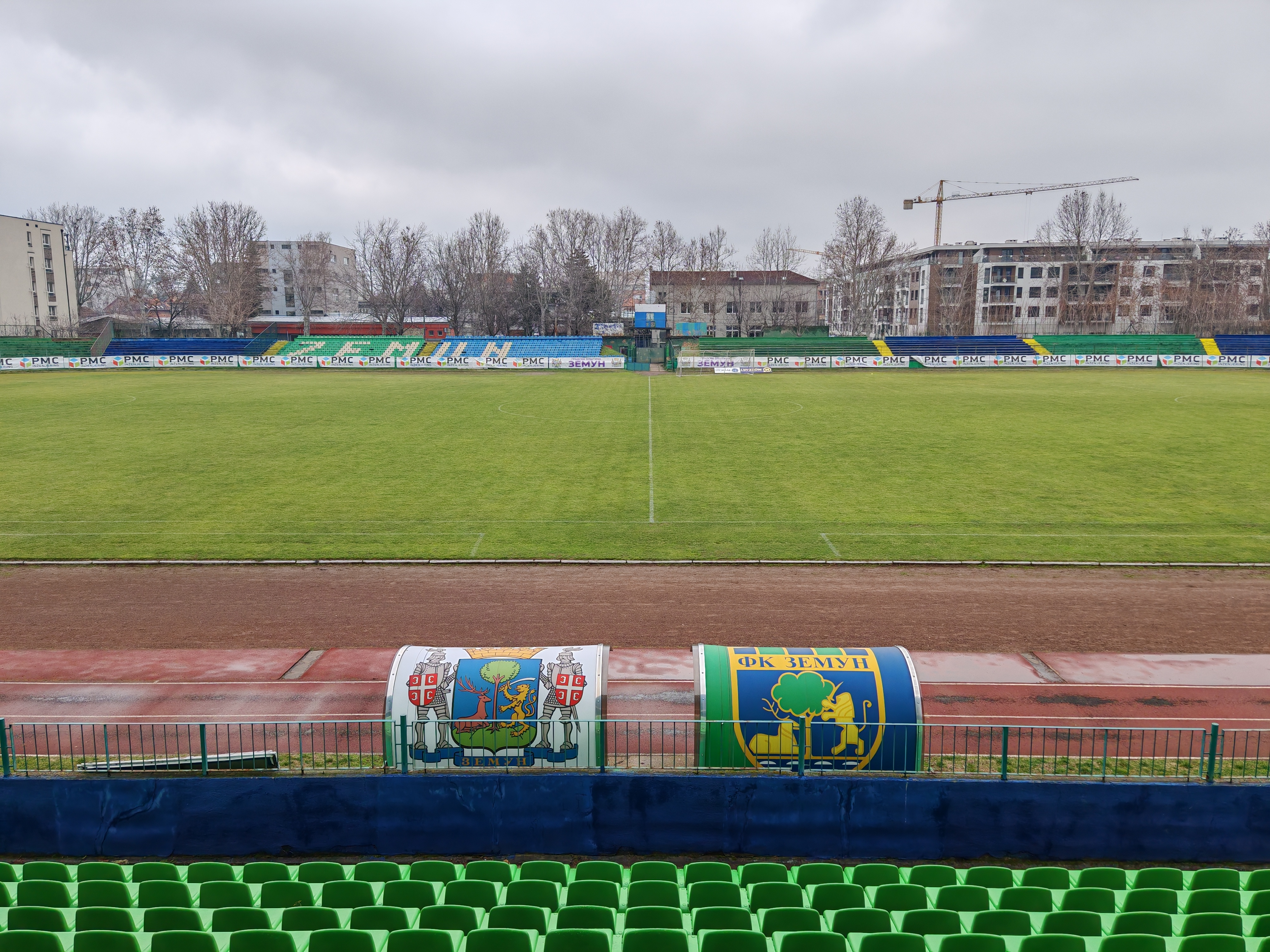
View on the football pitch of Zemun Stadium from the south stand

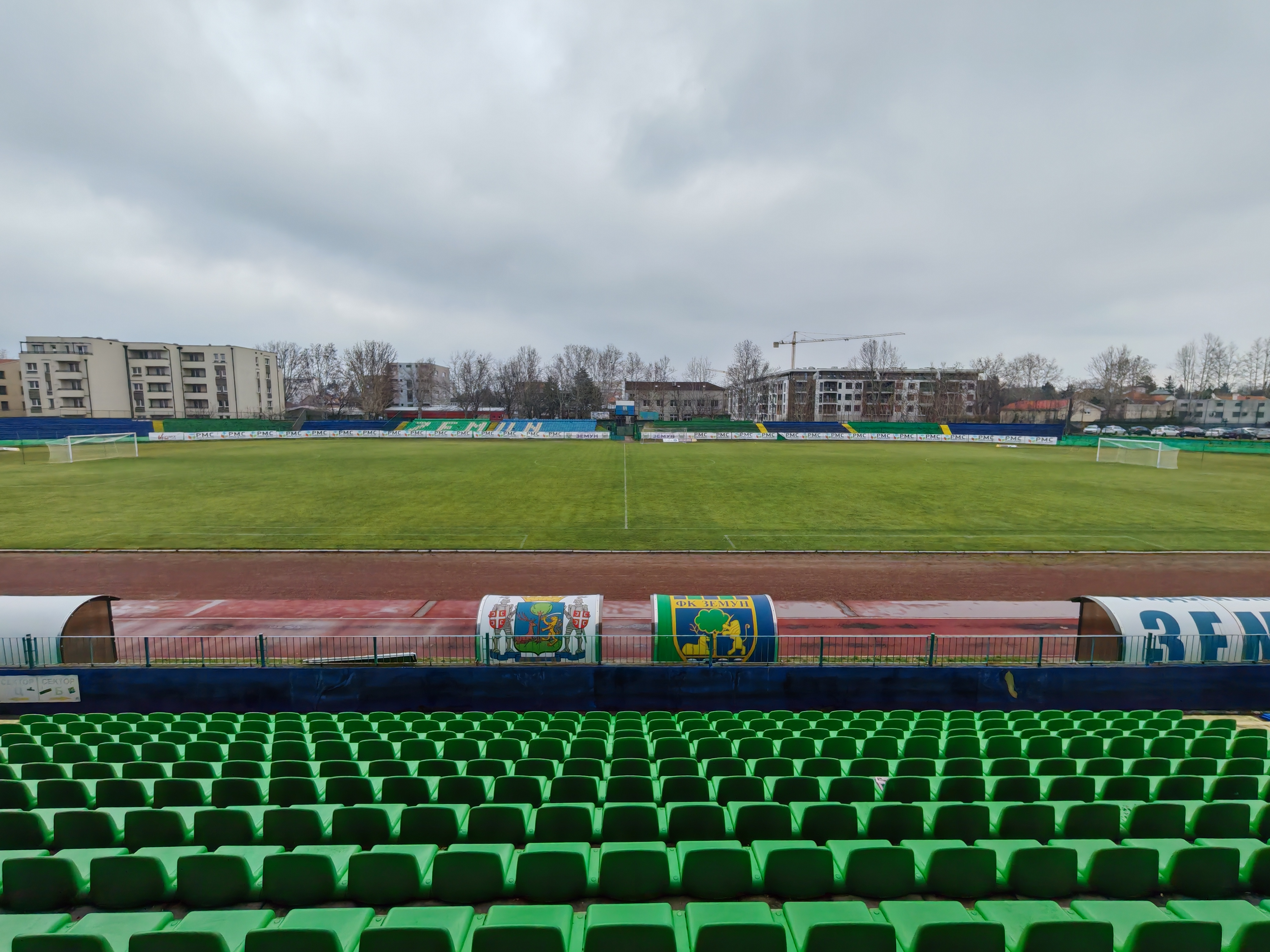
View (large) on the football pitch of Zemun Stadium from the south stand

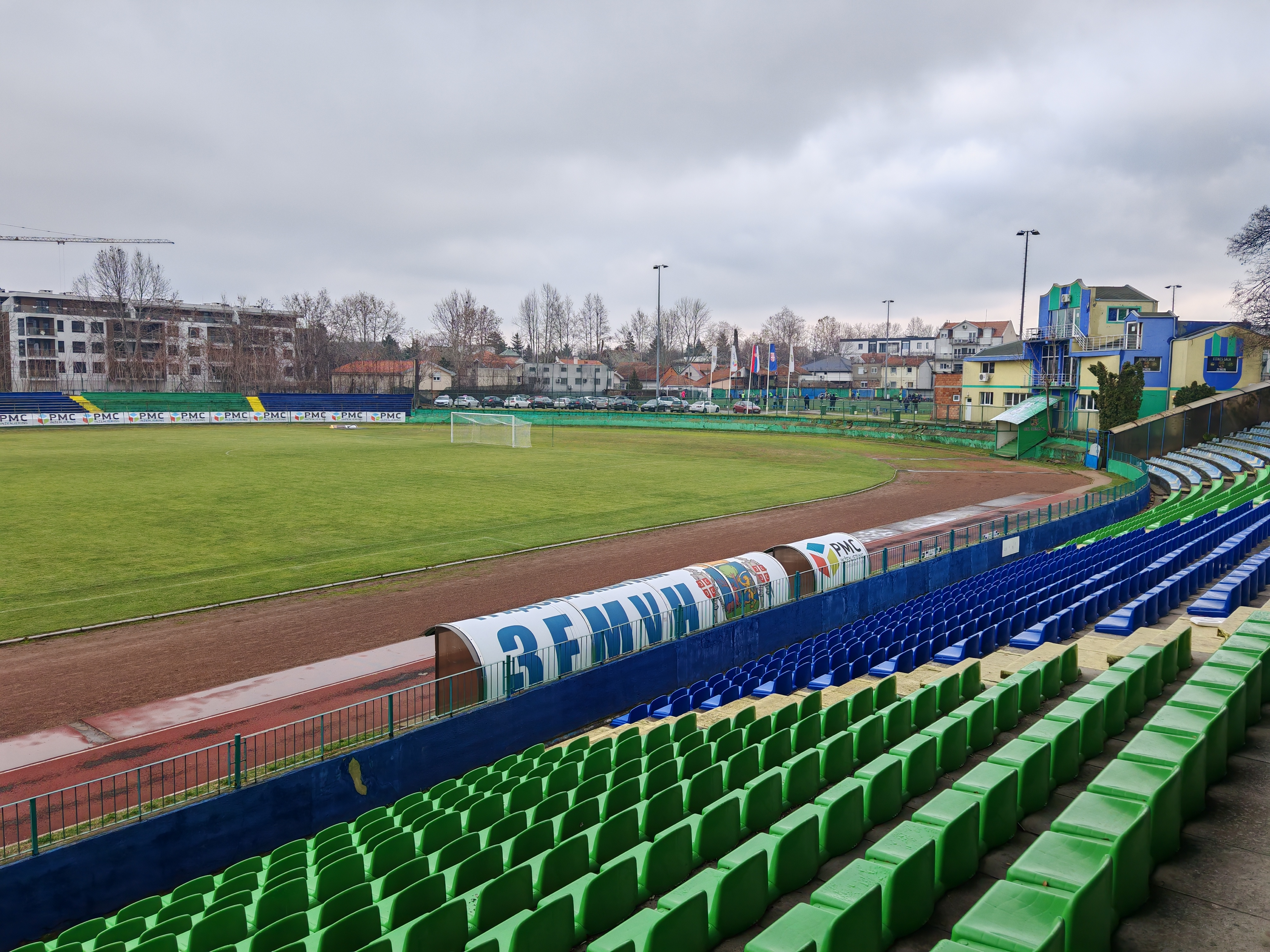
View towards east of Zemun Stadium from the south stand

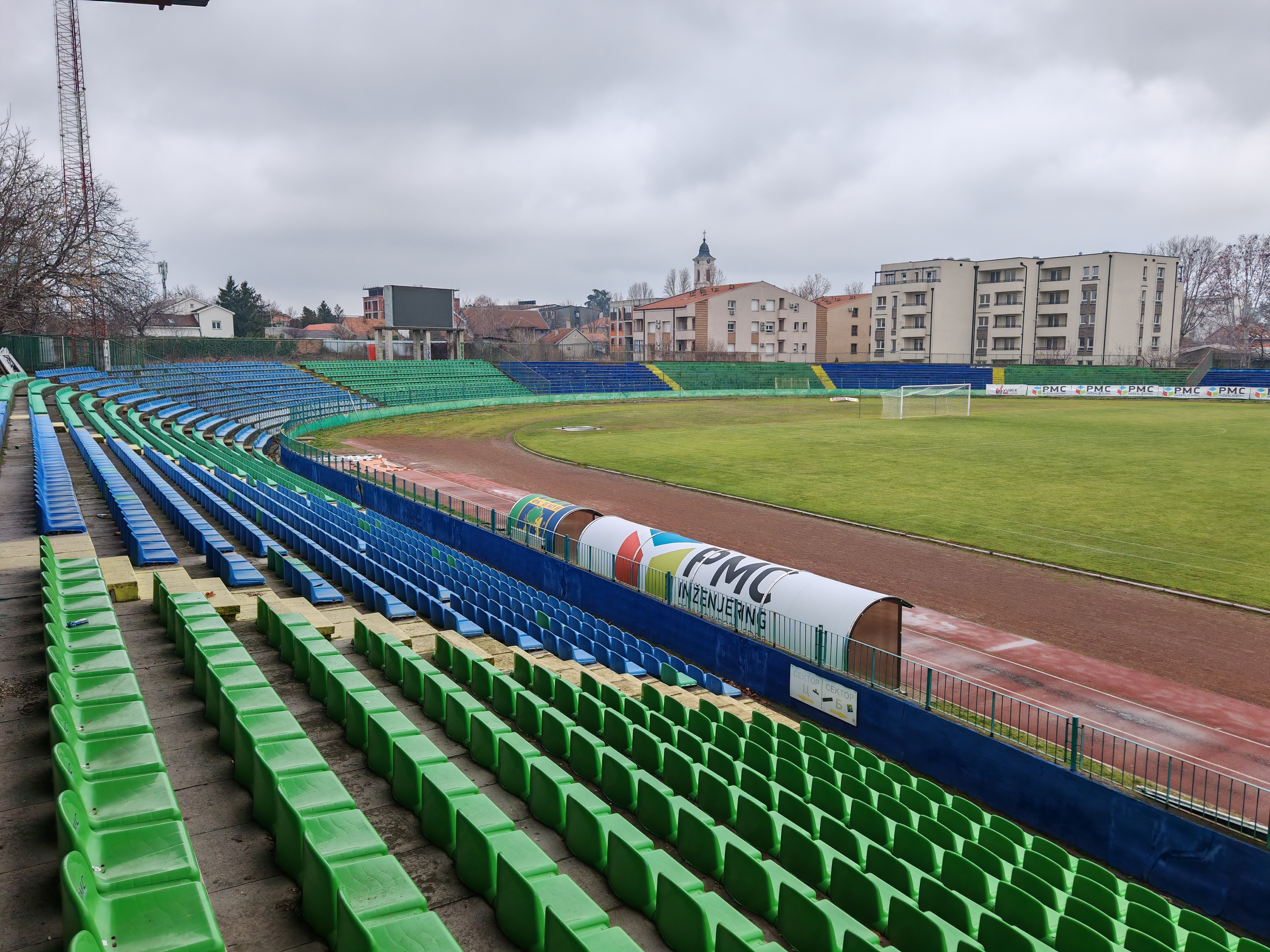
View towards the west stand of Zemun Stadium from the south stand

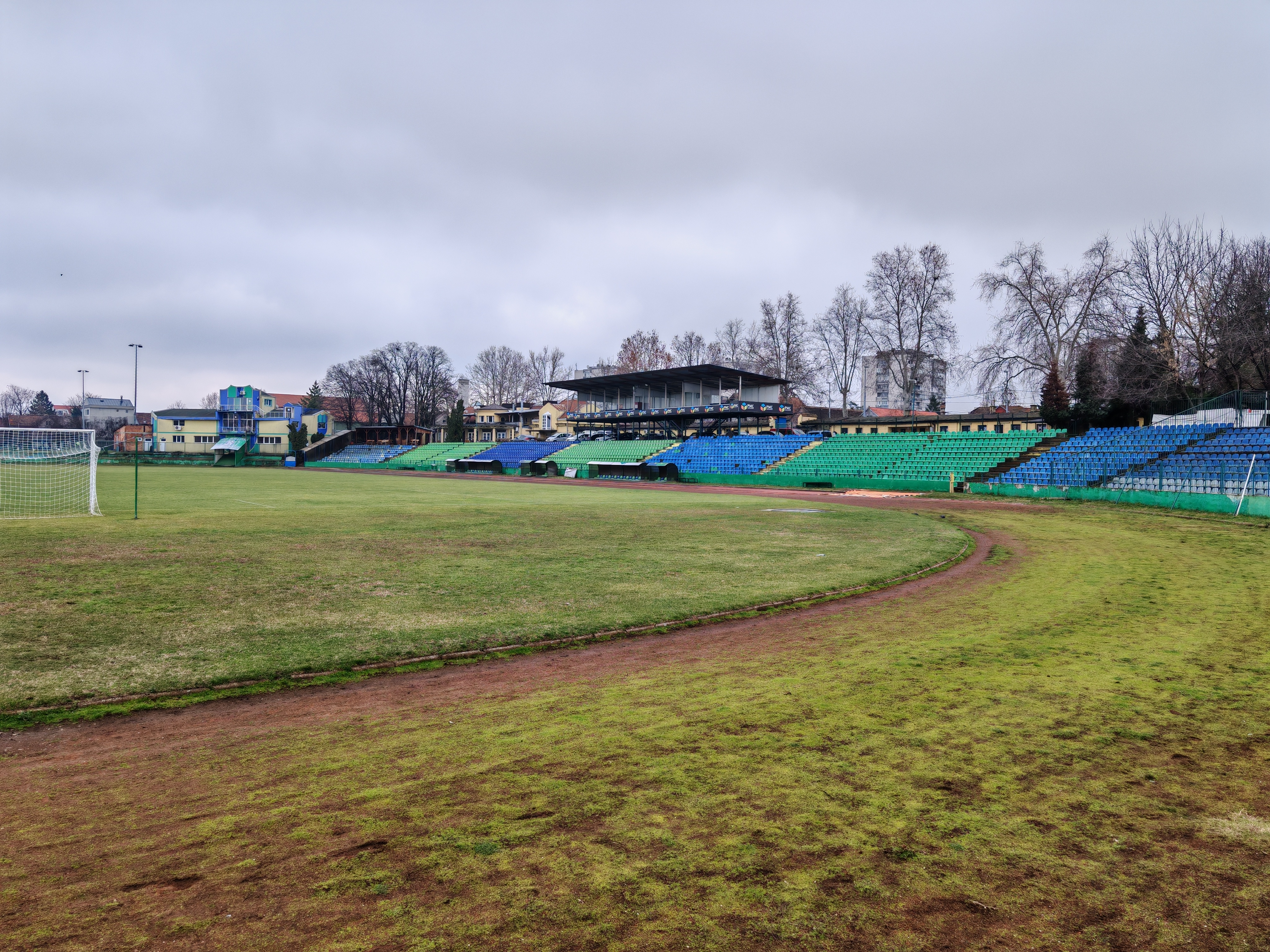
View on the south stand of Zemun Stadium from the west

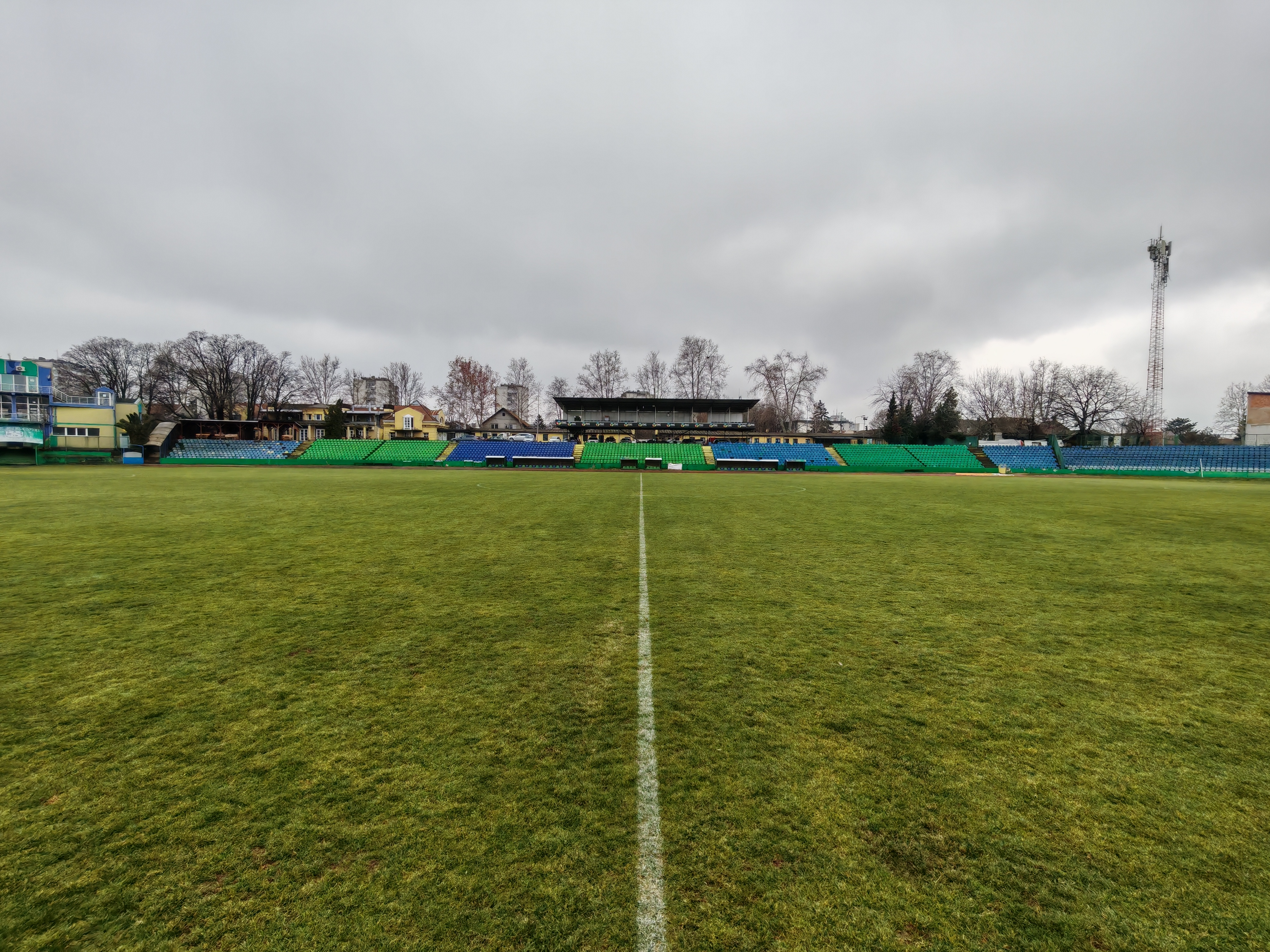
View on the south stand of Zemun Stadium from the north

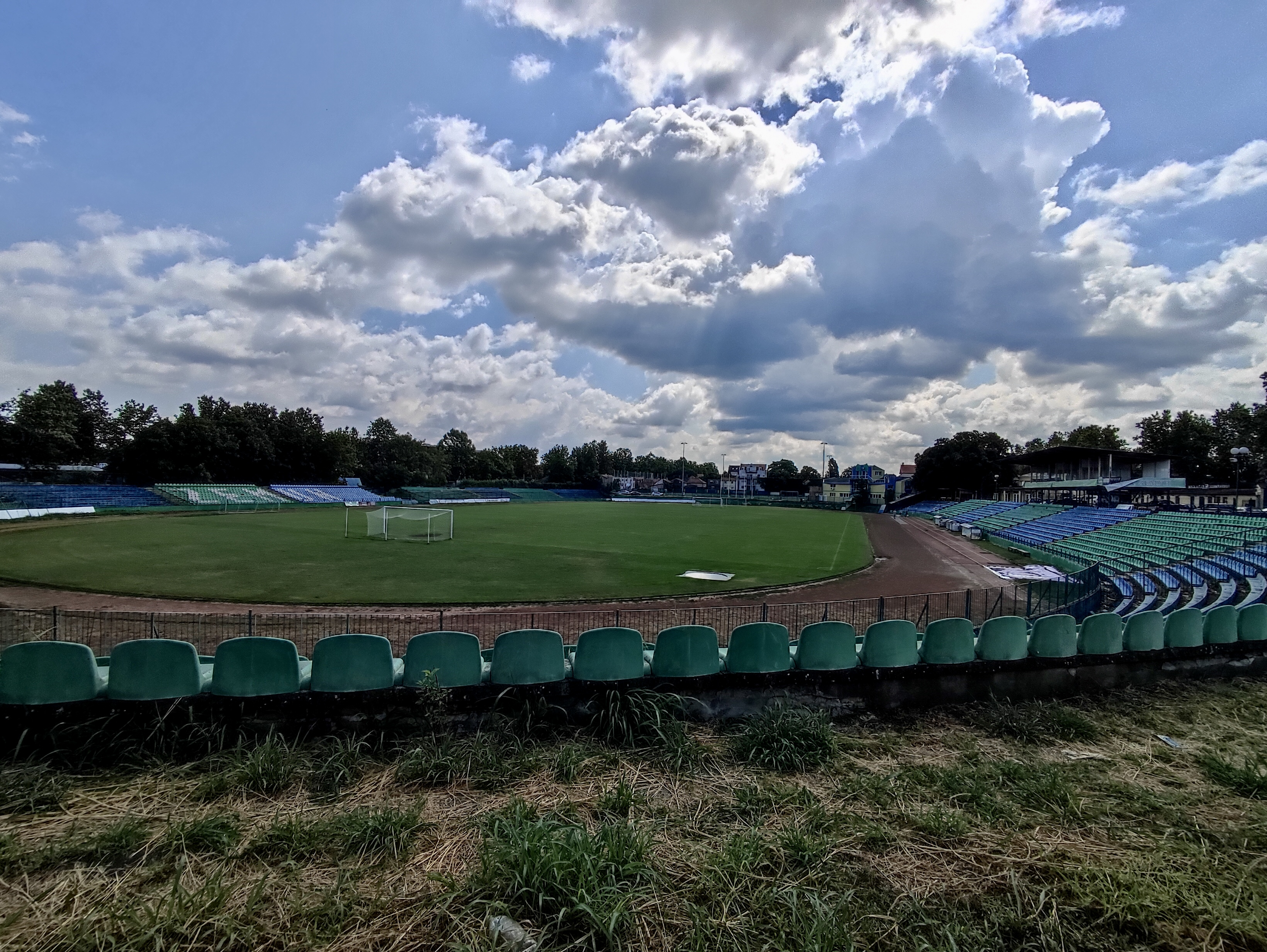
View from the west side on Zemun Stadium (from the outside), July 2022

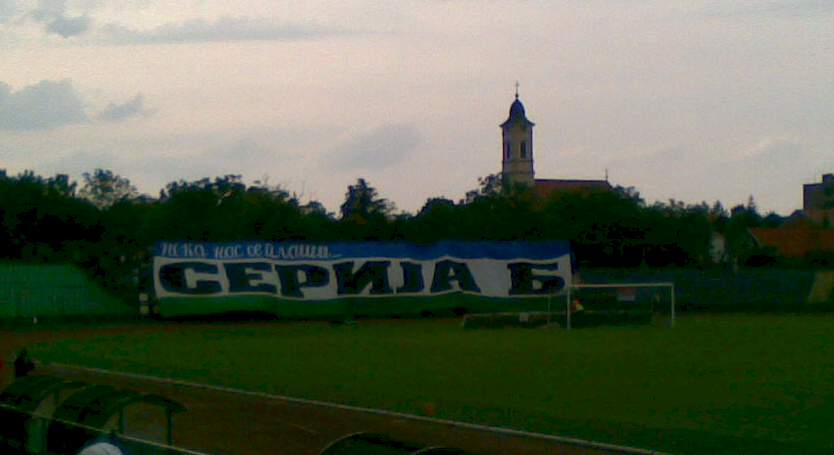
"Taurunum Boys" banner on the west stand of Zemun Stadium, May 2009

== Concerts ==
Artist	Concert	Date	Source
Tina Turner	Foreign Affair: The Farewell Tour	19 August 1990	
Bob Dylan	1991 European Tour	11 June 1991	

== See also ==
- List of football stadiums in Serbia
