= Never Ending Tour 1992 =

1992 concert tour by Bob Dylan

- Tour by Bob Dylan
- Poster to the concert in Aosta, Italy
- Start date: March 18, 1992
- End date: November 15, 1992
- Legs: 5
- No. of shows: 20 in Oceania; 61 in North America; 11 in Europe; 92 in Total

Bob Dylan concert chronology
- Never Ending Tour 1991 (1991); Never Ending Tour 1992 (1992); Never Ending Tour 1993 (1993)

The Never Ending Tour is the popular name for Bob Dylan's endless touring schedule since June 7, 1988.

== Background ==
The Never Ending Tour 1992 started with a large tour of Oceania. Dylan had performed nineteen concerts in Australia and one in New Zealand. Dylan performed a total of seven concerts at the Sydney State Theatre and six concerts at the Melbourne Palais Theatre. The tour ended on April 18 in Auckland, New Zealand at the Mount Smart Stadium.

Shortly after completing his Oceania tour Dylan travelled to Hawaii where he performed two concerts before continuing on to perform twenty date tour of the United States. This tour included a seven show residency at Pantages Theatre in Los Angeles, California. Dylan also performed two concerts at The Warfield Theatre in San Francisco as well as two nights at the Berkley Community Theatre and two shows at the Paramount Theatre in Seattle, Washington. This leg of the tour came to an end on May 23 in Las Vegas, Nevada.

On June 26 Dylan started an eleven date European tour, his only European concerts of that year. Dylan performed in fairly unknown venues in fairly unknown cities. The tour ended in Juan-les-Pins, France on July 12.

Just over a month later, Dylan started another North American tour starting in Toronto, Ontario, Canada on August 17. During the tour Dylan performed a five show residency at the Orpheum Theatre in Minneapolis, Minnesota. The tour culminated in a performance at the Lafayette Performing Arts Center in Florida.

The Outburst of Consciousness Tour was the final leg of the 1992 Never Ending Tour. The tour started in Pittsburgh, Pennsylvania on October 9. There was a break in the tour after only five shows. During the break many major musical artists gathered at Madison Square Garden to recognise Bob Dylan's 30 years as a recording artist. Recorded on October 16, 1992, in New York City, the concert featured many artists performing classic Dylan songs, before ending with three songs from Dylan himself. The tour continued on October 23 and finally ending on November 15 at the South Florida show grounds in West Palm Beach, Florida.

== Tour dates ==
Date	City	Country	Venue	Attendance	Box Office
Oceania
March 18, 1992	Perth	Australia	Perth Entertainment Centre	—	—
March 21, 1992	Adelaide	Australia	Adelaide Entertainment Centre	—	—
March 23, 1992	Sydney	Australia	The State Theatre	—	—
March 24, 1992	Sydney	Australia	The State Theatre	—	—
March 25, 1992	Sydney	Australia	The State Theatre	—	—
March 28, 1992	Brisbane	Australia	Brisbane Entertainment Centre	—	—
March 29, 1992	Canberra	Australia	Royal Theatre	—	—
April 1, 1992	Melbourne	Australia	Palais Theatre	—	—
April 2, 1992	Melbourne	Australia	Palais Theatre	—	—
April 3, 1992	Melbourne	Australia	Palais Theatre	—	—
April 5, 1992	Melbourne	Australia	Palais Theatre	—	—
April 6, 1992	Melbourne	Australia	Palais Theatre	—	—
April 7, 1992	Melbourne	Australia	Palais Theatre	—	—
April 10, 1992	Launceston	Australia	Silverdome	—	—
April 11, 1992	Hobart	Australia	Derwent Entertainment Centre	—	—
April 13, 1992	Sydney	Australia	The State Theatre	—	—
April 14, 1992	Sydney	Australia	The State Theatre	—	—
April 15, 1992	Sydney	Australia	The State Theatre	—	—
April 16, 1992	Sydney	Australia	The State Theatre	—	—
April 18, 1992	Auckland	New Zealand	Mount Smart Supertop	—	—
The One Sad Cry of Pity Tour II
April 22, 1992	Maui	United States	Wailea Tennis Club	—	—
April 24, 1992	Honolulu	United States	Waikiki Shell	—	—
April 27, 1992	Seattle	United States	Paramount Theatre	—	—
April 28, 1992	Seattle	United States	Paramount Theatre	—	—
April 30, 1992	Eugene	United States	Silva Concert Hall	—	—
May 1, 1992	Red Bluff	United States	Davis Pavilion	—	—
May 2, 1992	Santa Rosa	United States	Grace Pavilion	—	—
May 4, 1992	San Francisco	United States	The Warfield Theatre	—	—
May 5, 1992	San Francisco	United States	The Warfield Theatre	—	—
May 7, 1992	Berkeley	United States	Berkeley Community Theatre	—	—
May 8, 1992	Berkeley	United States	Berkeley Community Theatre	—	—
May 9, 1992	San Jose	United States	Event Center Arena	—	—
May 11, 1992	Santa Barbara	United States	Arlington Theater	—	—
May 13, 1992	Los Angeles	United States	Pantages Theatre	16,555 / 18,749	$519,975
May 14, 1992	Los Angeles	United States	Pantages Theatre	16,555 / 18,749	$519,975
May 16, 1992	Los Angeles	United States	Pantages Theatre	16,555 / 18,749	$519,975
May 17, 1992	Los Angeles	United States	Pantages Theatre	16,555 / 18,749	$519,975
May 19, 1992	Los Angeles	United States	Pantages Theatre	16,555 / 18,749	$519,975
May 20, 1992	Los Angeles	United States	Pantages Theatre	16,555 / 18,749	$519,975
May 21, 1992	Los Angeles	United States	Pantages Theatre	16,555 / 18,749	$519,975
May 23, 1992	Las Vegas	United States	Bally's Goldwin Events Center	—	—
Why Do You Look at Me So Strangely? Tour
June 26, 1992	Luleå	Sweden	Sjöslaget Lulea	—	—
June 28, 1992	Gothenburg	Sweden	Trädgårdsföreningen	—	—
June 30, 1992	Dunkirk	France	Côte d'Opale	—	—
July 1, 1992	Reims	France	Reims Exhibition Centre	—	—
July 2, 1992 (Note: The July 2, 1992 concert at La Base Nautique du Malsaucy in Belfort, France is part of Eurockéennes.)	Belfort	France	Lac de Malsaucy	—	—
July 4, 1992	Genoa	Italy	Porta Siberia	—	—
July 5, 1992	Correggio	Italy	Festa Communale Unita	—	—
July 7, 1992	Merano	Italy	Ippodromo di Maia	—	—
July 8, 1992	Aosta	Italy	Arena della Croix-Noire	—	—
July 10, 1992 (Note: The July 10, 1992 concert at La Base Nautique du Malsaucy in Belfort, France is part of Leysin Rock Festival.)	Leysin	Switzerland	Centre Sportif de la Patinoire	—	—
July 12, 1992 (Note: The July 12, 1992 concert at La Base Nautique du Malsaucy in Belfort, France is part of Jazz à Juan.)	Juan-les-Pins	France	La Pinède Gould	—	—
Southern Sympathiser Tour
August 17, 1992	Toronto	Canada	Massey Hall	—	—
August 18, 1992	Toronto	Canada	Massey Hall	—	—
August 20, 1992 (Note: The August 17, 1992 concert at Conneaut Lake Park in Conneaut Lake, Pennsylvania is part of Rock & Rally Conneaut.)	Conneaut Lake	United States	Conneaut Lake Park	—	—
August 21, 1992	Hamilton	Canada	Copps Coliseum	—	—
August 22, 1992	Ottawa	Canada	Landsdowne Park	—	—
August 23, 1992	Sudbury	Canada	Sudbury Community Arena	—	—
August 25, 1992	Sault Ste. Marie	Canada	Sault Memorial Gardens	—	—
August 27, 1992	Thunder Bay	Canada	Fort William Gardens	—	—
August 29, 1992	Minneapolis	United States	Orpheum Theatre	—	—
August 30, 1992	Minneapolis	United States	Orpheum Theatre	—	—
August 31, 1992	Minneapolis	United States	Orpheum Theatre	—	—
September 2, 1992	Minneapolis	United States	Orpheum Theatre	—	—
September 3, 1992	Minneapolis	United States	Orpheum Theatre	—	—
September 5, 1992	Omaha	United States	Orpheum Theatre	—	—
September 6, 1992	Kansas City	United States	Liberty Memorial Park	—	—
September 8, 1992	Little Rock	United States	Municipal Auditorium	—	—
September 9, 1992	Jackson	United States	Thalia Mara Hall	—	—
September 11, 1992	Birmingham	United States	Oak Mountain Amphitheater	—	—
September 12, 1992	Pensacola	United States	Bayfront Auditorium	—	—
September 13, 1992	Lafayette	United States	Heymann Performing Arts Center	—	—
Outburst of Consciousness Tour
October 9, 1992	Pittsburgh	United States	Palumbo Center	—	—
October 10, 1992	Lock Haven	United States	Thomas Fieldhouse	—	—
October 11, 1992	Rochester	United States	Eastman Theatre	—	—
October 12, 1992	Binghamton	United States	Broome County Forum Theatre	—	—
October 23, 1992	Newark	United States	Bob Carpenter Center	—	—
October 24, 1992	Storrs	United States	Harry A. Gampel Pavilion	—	—
October 25, 1992	Providence	United States	Providence Performing Arts Center	—	—
October 27, 1992	Burlington	United States	Burlington Memorial Auditorium	—	—
October 28, 1992	Springfield	United States	Paramount Theater	—	—
October 30, 1992	Beverly	United States	Endicott College	—	—
November 1, 1992	Wilkes-Barre	United States	F.M. Kirby Center	—	—
November 2, 1992	Youngstown	United States	Stambaugh Auditorium	—	—
November 3, 1992	Cincinnati	United States	Cincinnati Music Hall	—	—
November 6, 1992	Gainesville	United States	Stephen C. O'Connell Center	—	—
November 8, 1992	Coral Gables	United States	Whitten University Center	—	—
November 9, 1992	Sarasota	United States	Van Wezel Performing Arts Hall	—	—
November 11, 1992	Clearwater	United States	Ruth Eckerd Hall	—	—
November 12, 1992	Orlando	United States	UCF Arena	—	—
November 13, 1992	Sunrise	United States	Sunrise Musical Theater	—	—
November 15, 1992 (Note: The November 15, 1992 concert at the South Florida Fairgrounds in West Palm Beach, Florida is part of the Heritage Music Festival.)	West Palm Beach	United States	South Florida Fairgrounds	—	—
TOTAL				16,555 / 18,749 (88%)	$519,975
