= Never Ending Tour 1989 =

1989 concert tour by Bob Dylan

- Tour by Bob Dylan
- Poster to the concert in Athens, Greece
- Start date: May 27, 1989
- End date: November 15, 1989
- Legs: 3
- No. of shows: 21 in Europe; 78 in North America; 99 in total

Bob Dylan concert chronology
- Never Ending Tour (1988); Never Ending Tour (1989); Never Ending Tour (1990)

The Never Ending Tour is the popular name for Bob Dylan's endless touring schedule since June 7, 1988. His tally for this year was 100 shows.

== Background ==
The Never Ending Tour 1989 started in Sweden with a performance at Christinehof's Slottspark on May 22. This was only the fourth time that Dylan had performed in Sweden. He then performed in Finland, his second performance there, before returning to Sweden. He then performed two concerts in Dublin, Ireland, the first time that he had performed there since 1965. Dylan then performed in Glasgow, Scotland his second only performance in the city. The first being in 1966. After performing concerts in Birmingham and London Dylan performed in the Netherlands, Belgium, and France, Dylan performed three concerts in Spain, four in Italy, a single concert in Turkey and two concerts in Greece.

After finishing the European tour Dylan returned to the United States performing at many of the same venues that he had performed in the year before, on the first year of the Never Ending Tour. Dylan continued to perform in the United States and Canada until November 15.

== Tour dates ==
Date	City	Country	Venue
Europe
May 27, 1989	Tomelilla	Sweden	Christinehof Castle
May 28, 1989	Stockholm	Sweden	Globen Arena
May 30, 1989	Helsinki	Finland	Helsinki Ice Hall
June 3, 1989	Dublin	Ireland	RDS Arena
June 4, 1989	Dublin	Ireland	RDS Arena
June 6, 1989	Glasgow	Scotland	Scottish Exhibition and Conference Centre
June 7, 1989	Birmingham	England	National Exhibition Centre
June 8, 1989	London	England	Wembley Arena
June 10, 1989	The Hague	Netherlands	Statenhale
June 11, 1989	Brussels	Belgium	Forest National
June 13, 1989	Fréjus	France	Amphithéâtre de Fréjus
June 15, 1989	Madrid	Spain	Palacio de Deportes de la Comunidad
June 16, 1989	Barcelona	Spain	Palau dels Esports de Barcelona
June 17, 1989	San Sebastián	Spain	Velódromo de Anoeta
June 19, 1989	Milan	Italy	Palatrussardi
June 20, 1989	Rome	Italy	Palazzo della Civiltà Italiana
June 21, 1989	Cava de' Tirreni	Italy	Stadio Simonetta Lamberti
June 22, 1989	Livorno	Italy	Stadio Armando Picchi
June 24, 1989	Istanbul	Turkey	Cemil Topuzlu Open-Air Theatre
June 26, 1989 (Note: The June 26, 1989 concert in Patras was part of Patras International Festival.)	Patras	Greece	Papacharalambeio National Stadium
June 28, 1989	Athens	Greece	Panathenaic Stadium
North America
July 1, 1989	Peoria	United States	Peoria Civic Center
July 2, 1989	Hoffman Estates	United States	Poplar Creek Music Theater
July 3, 1989 (Note: The July 3, 1989 concert in Milwaukee, Wisconsin was part of Summerfest.)	Milwaukee	United States	Marcus Amphitheater
July 5, 1989	Rochester	United States	Howard C. Baldwin Memorial Pavilion
July 6, 1989	Rochester	United States	Howard C. Baldwin Memorial Pavilion
July 8, 1989	Noblesville	United States	Deer Creek Music Center
July 9, 1989	Cuyahoga Falls	United States	Blossom Music Center
July 11, 1989	Harrisburg	United States	Skyline Sports Complex
July 12, 1989	Allentown	United States	Allentown Fairgrounds
July 13, 1989	Mansfield	United States	Great Woods Performing Arts Center
July 15, 1989	Old Orchard Beach	United States	The Ball Park
July 16, 1989	Bristol	United States	Lake Compounce
July 17, 1989	Stanhope	United States	Waterloo Village
July 19, 1989	Columbia	United States	Merriweather Post Pavilion
July 20, 1989	Atlantic City	United States	Bally's Atlantic City
July 21, 1989	Holmdel	United States	Garden State Arts Center
July 23, 1989	Wantagh	United States	Jones Beach Marine Theater
July 25, 1989	Canandaigua	United States	Finger Lakes Performing Arts Center
July 26, 1989	Saratoga Springs	United States	Saratoga Performing Arts Center
July 28, 1989	Pittsburgh	United States	Pittsburgh Civic Arena
July 29, 1989	Vaughan	Canada	Kingswood Music Theatre
July 30, 1989	Ottawa	Canada	Ottawa Civic Centre
July 31, 1989	Joliette	Canada	Amphitheatre Joliette
August 3, 1989	Saint Paul	United States	Harriet Island Pavilion
August 4, 1989	Madison	United States	Dane County Coliseum
August 5, 1989	Grand Rapids	United States	Welsh Auditorium
August 6, 1989	Columbus	United States	Cooper Stadium
August 8, 1989	Toledo	United States	John F. Savage Hall
August 9, 1989	St. Louis	United States	The Muny
August 10, 1989	Cincinnati	United States	Riverbend Music Center
August 12, 1989	Doswell	United States	Kings Dominion
August 13, 1989	Charlotte	United States	Carowinds Paladium
August 15, 1989	Atlanta	United States	Chastain Park Amphitheatre
August 16, 1989	Atlanta	United States	Chastain Park Amphitheatre
August 18, 1989	Louisville	United States	Freedom Hall
August 19, 1989 (Note: The August 19, 1989 concert in Springfield, Illinois was part of the Illinois State Fair.)	Springfield	United States	Illinois State Fair Grandstand
August 20, 1989	Nashville	United States	Starwood Amphitheatre
August 22, 1989	Bonner Springs	United States	Sandstone Amphitheater
August 23, 1989	Oklahoma City	United States	Zoo Amphitheater
August 25, 1989	New Orleans	United States	Lakefront Arena
August 26, 1989	Houston	United States	The Summit
August 27, 1989	Dallas	United States	Coca-Cola Starplex Amphitheatre
August 29, 1989	Las Cruces	United States	Pan American Center
August 30, 1989	Greenwood Village	United States	Fiddler's Green Amphitheatre
September 1, 1989	Park City	United States	Park West Amphitheater
September 3, 1989	Berkeley	United States	Hearst Greek Theatre
September 5, 1989	Santa Barbara	United States	Santa Barbara Bowl
September 6, 1989	San Diego	United States	Starlight Bowl
September 8, 1989	Costa Mesa	United States	Pacific Amphitheatre
September 9, 1989	Los Angeles	United States	Greek Theatre
September 10, 1989	Los Angeles	United States	Greek Theatre
October 10, 1989	New York City	United States	Beacon Theatre
October 11, 1989	New York City	United States	Beacon Theatre
October 12, 1989	New York City	United States	Beacon Theatre
October 13, 1989	New York City	United States	Beacon Theatre
October 15, 1989	Upper Darby Township	United States	Tower Theater
October 16, 1989	Upper Darby Township	United States	Tower Theater
October 17, 1989	Washington, D.C.	United States	DAR Constitution Hall
October 18, 1989	Washington, D.C.	United States	DAR Constitution Hall
October 20, 1989	Poughkeepsie	United States	Mid-Hudson Civic Center
October 22, 1989	Kingston	United States	Keaney Gymnasium
October 23, 1989	Boston	United States	Opera House
October 24, 1989	Boston	United States	Opera House
October 25, 1989	Boston	United States	Opera House
October 27, 1989	Troy	United States	Houston Field House
October 29, 1989	Ithaca	United States	Park Auditorium
October 31, 1989	Chicago	United States	Arie Crown Theater
November 1, 1989	Ann Arbor	United States	Hill Auditorium
November 2, 1989	Cleveland	United States	State Theatre
November 4, 1989	Indiana, PA	United States	Fisher Auditorium, Indiana University of Pennsylvania
November 6, 1989	Blacksburg	United States	Cassell Coliseum
November 7, 1989	Norfolk	United States	Chrysler Hall
November 8, 1989	Durham	United States	Cameron Indoor Stadium
November 10, 1989	Atlanta	United States	Fox Theatre
November 12, 1989	Sunrise	United States	Sunrise Musical Theater
November 13, 1989	Sunrise	United States	Sunrise Musical Theater
November 14, 1989	Tampa	United States	Tampa Festival Hall
November 15, 1989	Tampa	United States	Tampa Festival Hall
