= Gigantinho =

Sports arena in Porto Alegre, Brazil

Coordinates: 30°3′52″S 51°14′3″W

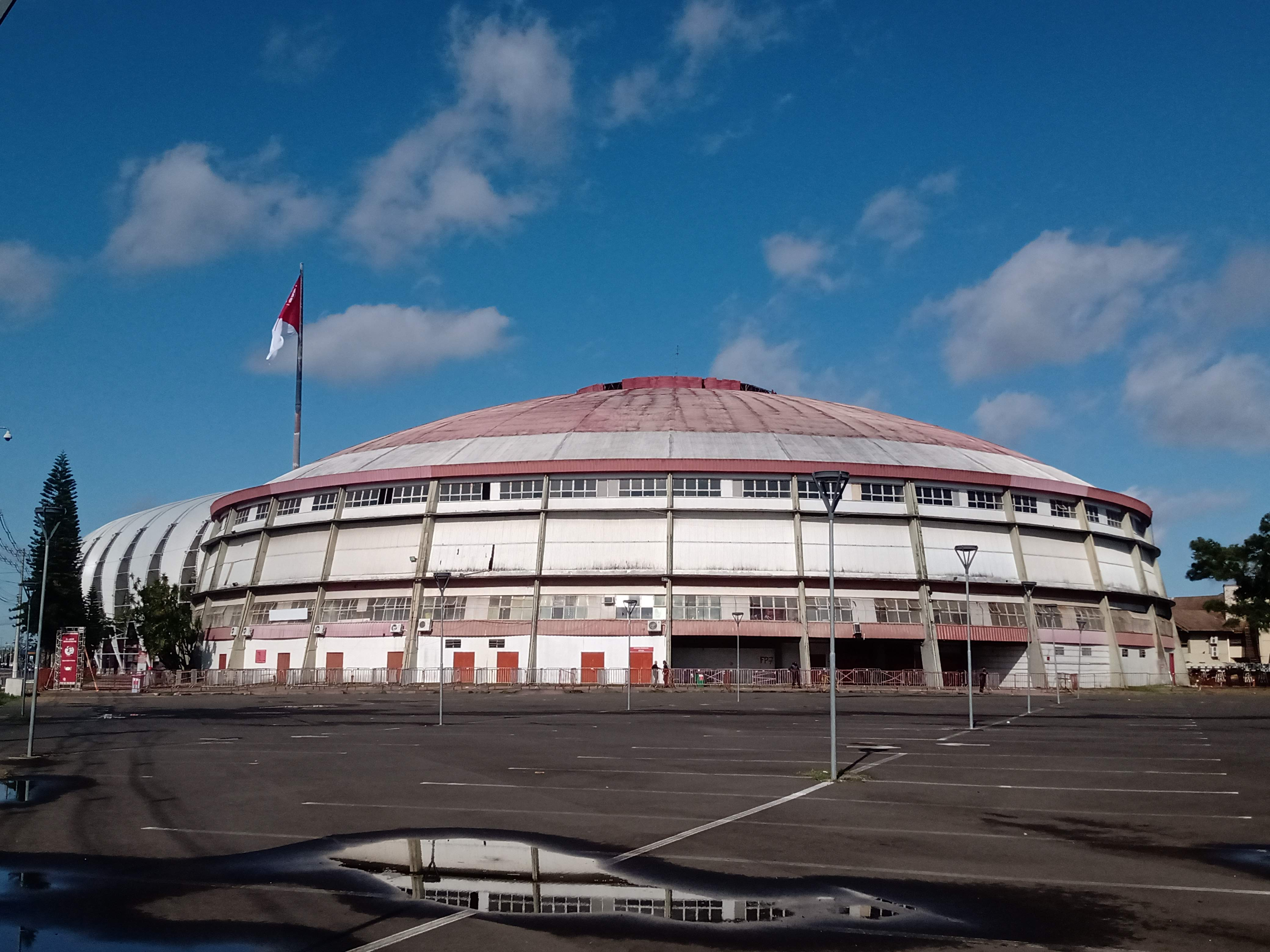
- Interactive map of Gigantinho
- Full name: Ginásio Gigantinho
- Location: Porto Alegre, Rio Grande do Sul, Brazil
- Owner: Sport Club Internacional
- Capacity: 14,586

Construction
- Opened: November 4, 1973

The Gigantinho ("Little Giant" in Portuguese) is an indoor sports arena in Porto Alegre, Brazil. The sixth largest arena in the country, it was opened on 4 November 1973. It is located in the riverside Beira-Rio complex of Sport Club Internacional, next to the "Gigante" ("Giant") stadium.

== Facilities ==
Covering 7,200 square meters, the arena includes an indoor football pitch. The capacity of the gym is 12,864 people for games and 14,586 for concerts. Eleven cabins are set aside for the press. There are thirteen bathrooms (six women, six men and one for the disabled), six changing rooms, and eleven bars. The gym houses the Foundation for Education and Culture of SCI (FECI), where the library is located.

The Gigantinho has hosted numerous events and concerts, as well as the World Social Forum and the World Forum on Education.

== Concerts ==
Many concerts have been held at the arena during recent years, including:

Artist	Date	Tour
The Jackson Five	September 17, 1974	The Jackson 5 World Tour
Genesis	May 10&11, 1977	Wind & Wuthering Tour
Van Halen	February 1&2, 1983	Hide Your Sheep Tour
Echo & the Bunnymen	May 9, 1987	
New Order	November 28, 1988	
Jethro Tull	August 2, 1988	20th Anniversary Tour
Jethro Tull	September 8, 1990	Rock Island Tour
Eric Clapton	October 16, 1990	Journeyman World Tour
A-ha	June 7, 1990	East Of The Sun West Of The Moon Tour
Bob Dylan	August 14, 1991	Never Ending Tour 1991
Faith no More	September 27, 1991	The Real Thing Tour
Roxette	May 6, 1992	Join the Joyride! Tour
Iron Maiden	August 4, 1992	Fear of the Dark Tour
Red Hot Chili Peppers	October 14, 2002	By the Way World Tour
Deep Purple	September 18, 2003	Bananas Tour
Deep Purple	November 25, 2006	Rapture Of The Deep Tour
RBD	October 3,4, 2006	Tour Generación RBD
Evanescence	April 17, 2007	The Open Door Tour
RBD	April 27, 2007	Tour Celestial
Iron Maiden	March 5, 2008	Somewhere Back in Time World Tour
Green Day	October 13, 2010	21st Century Breakdown World Tour
Jonas Brothers	November 10, 2010	Jonas Brothers Live in Concert World Tour
Ringo Starr	November 10, 2010	11th All Star Band Tour
Linkin Park	October 12, 2012	Living Things World Tour
Robert Plant	October 29, 2012	The Sensational Space Shifters Tour
Kiss	November 14, 2012	Monster Tour

== See also ==
- List of indoor arenas in Brazil
