= Billie Jean Horton =

American singer-songwriter (b. 1933)

- Born: Billie Jean Jones; June 6, 1933 (age 93); Bossier City, Louisiana, U.S.
- Occupations: Country music singer-songwriter; music promoter
- Years active: 1952–1980s
- Spouses: Harrison Eshleman (divorced) Hank Williams (m. 1952; died 1953) Johnny Horton (m. 1953; died 1960) Kent Berlin (divorced)
- Children: 4

Billie Jean Horton (née Jones; born June 6, 1933) is an American country-music singer-songwriter and music promoter. She had two high-profile marriages: first to country musician and singer-songwriter Hank Williams from 1952 until his death in 1953, and then to singer Johnny Horton from 1953 until his death in 1960.

== Biography ==
Horton was the daughter of a police chief from Bossier City, Louisiana. She divorced her first husband Harrison Eshleman when she was introduced to Hank Williams by her then-boyfriend, country singer Faron Young. They married in a private ceremony in Minden, Louisiana, on October 18, 1952, then repeated their vows before sold-out audiences at two Williams concerts at the Baton Rouge High School gymnasium and the Municipal Auditorium in New Orleans, Louisiana. She was 19 years old at the time of her marriage to Williams.

Williams died from heart failure on New Year's Day, 1953, five days before his daughter Jett Williams with Bobbie Jett was born. That September, Billie Jean married country singer Johnny Horton and became important in promoting his career. They had two daughters, Yanina and Melody, and Horton adopted her daughter Jeri Lynn. Horton died on November 5, 1960, in a traffic collision with a truck, widowing Billie Jean a second time. She then worked as a recording artist; her record "Ocean of Tears" hit the country top 40 in 1961. She had a relationship with Johnny Cash (while he was still married to his first wife, Vivian Liberto). Later, she married insurance executive Kent Berlin, whom she subsequently divorced.

In 1971, a judge ruled that despite her divorce from Eshleman not being finalized before her wedding with Williams, she entered the marriage in good faith, thus their union was entitled to a presumption of validity.

Horton engaged in numerous court cases defending her status as Hank Williams' widow and establishing claims to copyrights and estates. In the early 1970s, she sued MGM to stop distribution of the film Your Cheatin' Heart, a cinematic version of Williams’ story starring George Hamilton, which she believed portrayed her in a negative light. She won.

As of 2016, she resides in an assisted-living facility and her three daughters live in Shreveport.

== Film depiction ==
Horton is portrayed by actress Maddie Hasson in the 2015 biopic film about Hank Williams' life titled I Saw the Light, based on Hank Williams: The Biography.
