= Charleston Municipal Auditorium =

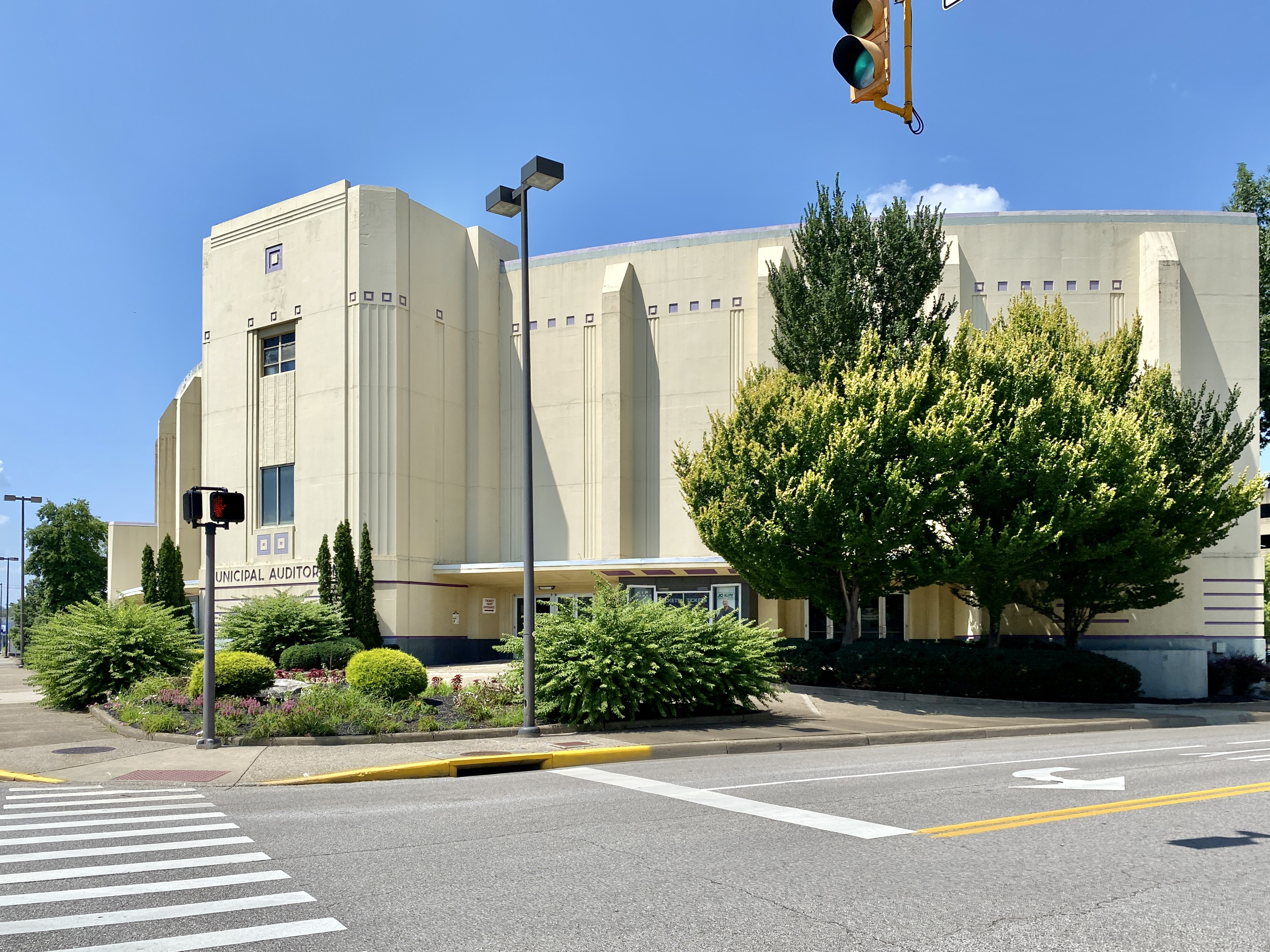
- Exterior of venue (c. 2023)

- Location in West Virginia Location in the United States
- Address: 224 Virginia St. E.
- Location: Charleston, West Virginia
- Coordinates: 38°21′10″N 81°38′24″W
- Owner: City of Charleston
- Operator: Oak View Group
- Capacity: 3,483

Construction
- Built: 1937-1939
- Opened: November 4, 1939
- Closed: February 2024
- Years active: 1939-2024
- Cost: $500,000 ($11.6 million in 2025 dollars)
- Architect: Alphonso Wysong
- Charleston Municipal Auditorium
- U.S. National Register of Historic Places
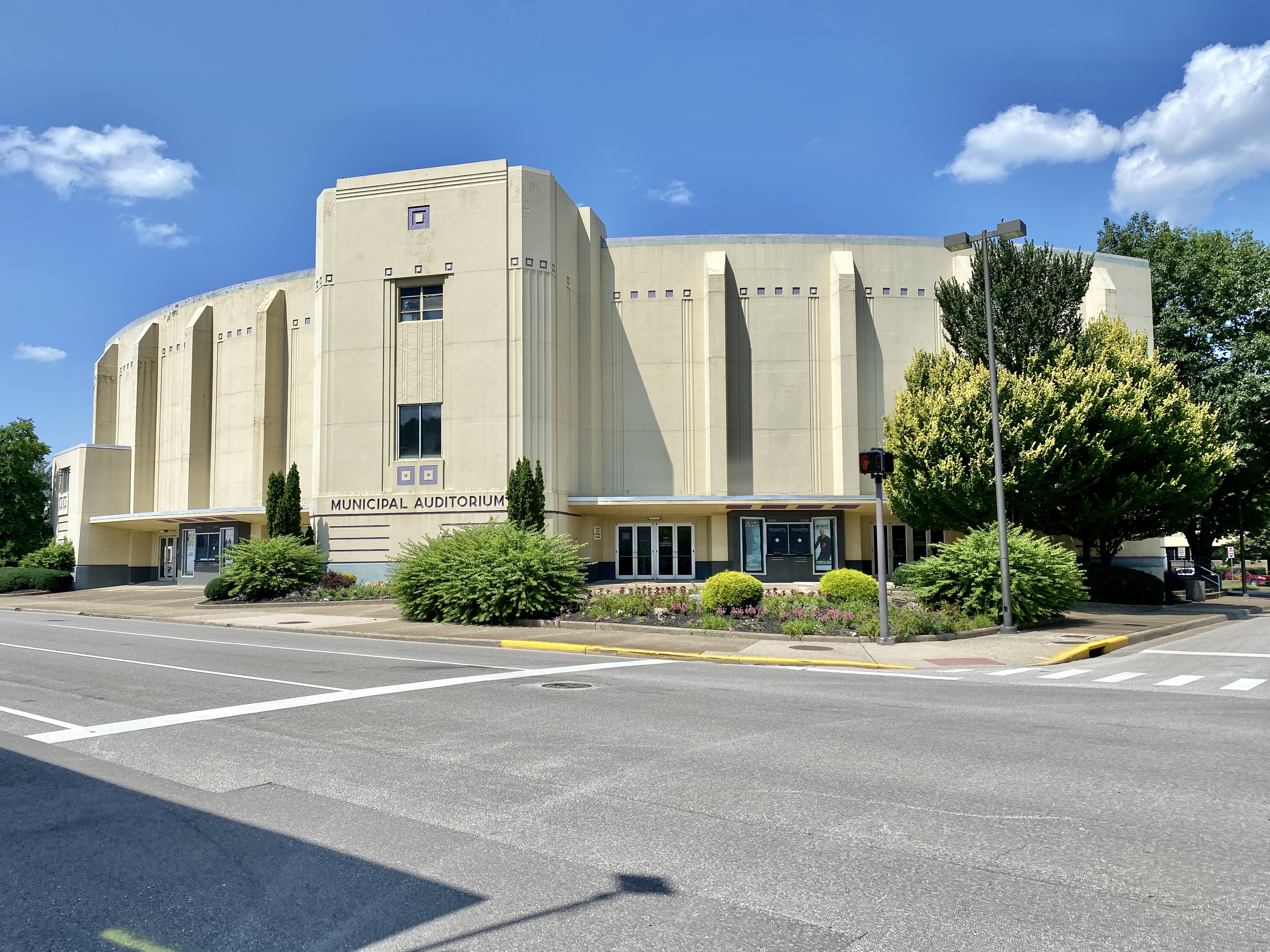
- Charleston Municipal Auditorium, July 2023
- Location: 224 Virginia St. E., Charleston, West Virginia
- Architect: Alphonso Wysong
- Architectural style: Art Deco
- NRHP reference No.: 99001398
- Added to NRHP: November 22, 1999

The Charleston Municipal Auditorium is a public auditorium in Charleston, West Virginia, and is part of the Charleston Coliseum & Convention Center. It opened on November 4, 1939, and was closed until further notice in February 2024.

With a capacity of 3,483 (2,377 on the orchestra level and 1,106 on the balcony), the Municipal Auditorium is the largest theater in West Virginia. Concerts, graduations, Broadway stage shows and other special events, including the annual presentation of The Nutcracker, are held on the auditorium's 65-by-85.5-foot stage.

== History ==
In the mid-1930s, as Charleston’s population and cultural ambitions grew, citizens began calling for a larger and more suitable public assembly hall. Larry Silverstein, president of the Community Music Association, led a determined effort to persuade voters to approve a bond referendum on December 29, 1936, which provided the city’s share of funding for what became a $500,000 project. The project advanced under the Public Works Administration as part of the New Deal’s nationwide program of civic improvements.

On November 4, 1939, the new Charleston Municipal Auditorium was dedicated during a four-hour ceremony attended by approximately 5,000 people. At the event, the regional PWA administrator praised the project, declaring that the agency’s $212,000 contribution was “fully justified” and that the building compared favorably with some of the finest auditoriums in the United States. The completion of the auditorium marked a turning point for the city, providing a grand stage for concerts, conventions, and community events for decades to come.

Country music singer Hank Williams (1923-1953) was scheduled to perform a New Year's Eve show at the auditorium on December 31, 1952. Due to bad weather in Nashville, he was not able to fly to the venue. While en route to the New Year's Day show in Canton, Ohio, Williams died of heart failure in the back seat of his Cadillac near Oak Hill, West Virginia.

It is an example of the Art Deco architectural style in a public building and was listed on the National Register of Historic Places in 1999.

The auditorium was closed in February 2024 after engineers discovered structural and safety concerns during a routine assessment. In January 2025, the Charleston City Council allocated $1 million to fund a detailed study to determine the building’s future and explore options for preserving its historic façade. The closure has left the venue’s long-term status uncertain.

== Notable performances ==
List of notable performances held at the Charleston Municipal Auditorium.

Artist	Year(s)
AC/DC	1977
Billy Joel	1977
Bob Dylan	1980 x2, 1990, 1996, 2021
Chuck Berry	1955, 1956, 1957, 1961
Fleetwood Mac	1975
Godsmack	2007
Golden Earring	1974, 1975
James Taylor	2011
Johnny Cash	1959, 1968
Little Richard	1956
Ray Charles	1951, 1956, 1960
R.E.M.	1987
The Romantics	1984
Waylon Jennings	1979
