= Campus Pond (Amherst, Massachusetts) =

Pond at the University of Massachusetts Amherst

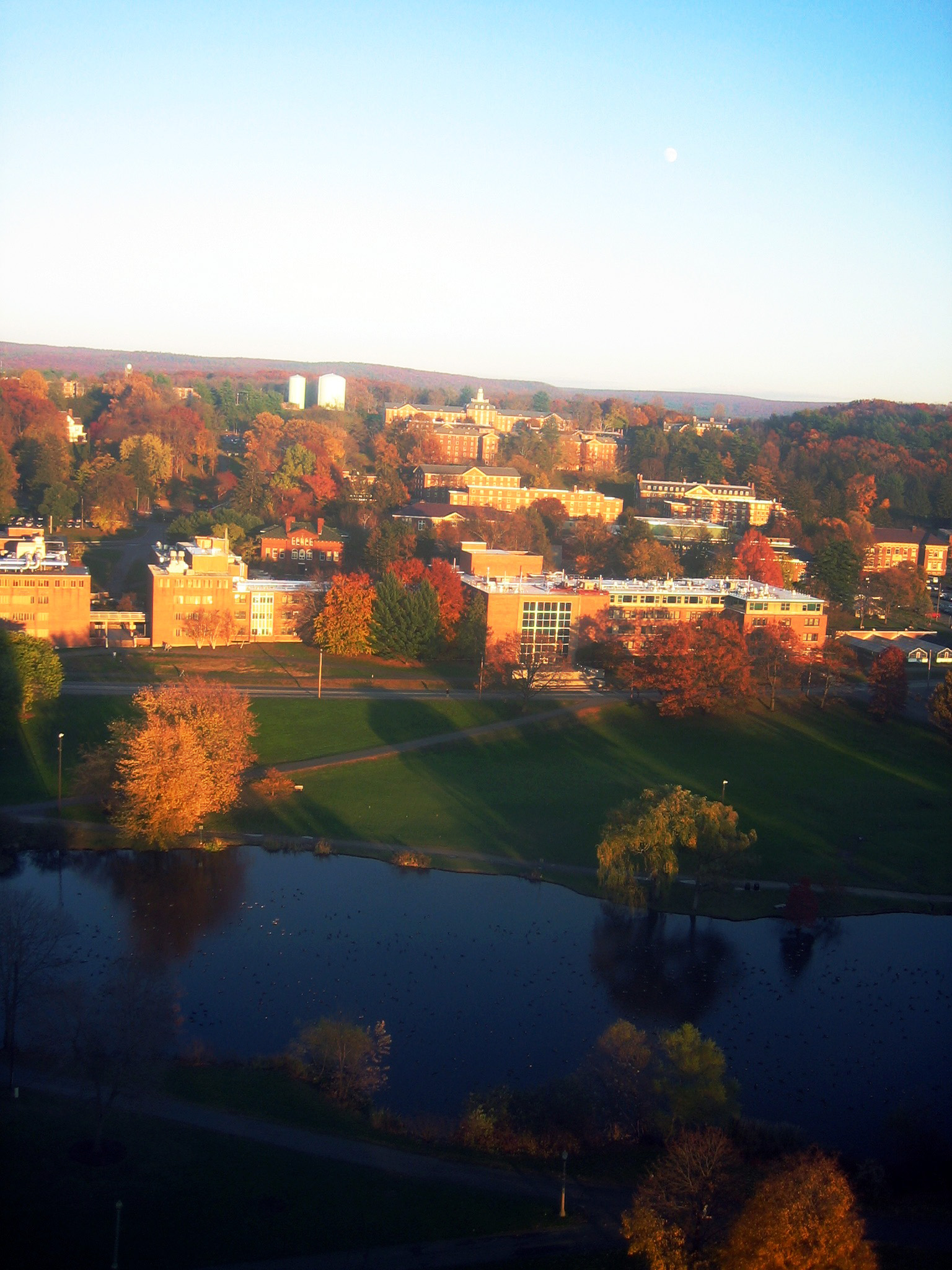
- A view to the east of campus, with the pond in the foreground

- Location within Massachusetts Location within the United States
- Location: University of Massachusetts Amherst
- Coordinates: 42°23′21.87″N 72°31′35″W
- Type: Pond

The Campus Pond at the University of Massachusetts Amherst is a pond located in the center of campus that was created in the early 1890s. It is bordered to the south by the Fine Arts Center.

== History ==
In the late 1880s, Massachusetts Agricultural College, a college in University of Massachusetts Amherst, decided to create a dam on one of the streams that ran through campus. The stream ran through the center of campus dividing the orchards on the eastern side and the academic buildings and fields on the west side. In the early years, the stream was dammed during the winter of 1890 and 1891 by two students. The pond was justified as a source of natural ice for dairy and orchard activities in the days before refrigeration. Over the years, the pond was used for various student activities, as well as numerous events, including the Spring Concert.

Over the years, the number of Canada geese has increased around the pond, a direct result of increased acreage of lawns around the region. Furthermore, their waste has combined to create a nuisance for pedestrians in and around the pond, as well as foul the pond with algae growth. In 2009 two fountains were installed in order to help mitigate the algae.

Since the original stated purpose of the pond has become outdated, students have found other ways to use the pond. These uses include ice skating and swimming, and to a lesser extent, swimming during the spring term.
