= Your Cheatin' Heart (film) =

1964 film by Gene Nelson

- Directed by: Gene Nelson
- Written by: Stanford Whitmore
- Produced by: Sam Katzman
- Starring: George Hamilton; Susan Oliver; Red Buttons
- Cinematography: Ellis W. Carter
- Edited by: Ben Lewis
- Music by: Fred Karger
- Production company: Four-Leaf Productions
- Distributed by: Metro-Goldwyn-Mayer
- Release date: November 4, 1964
- Running time: 99 minutes
- Country: United States
- Language: English
- Box office: $2,500,000 (US/ Canada rentals)

Your Cheatin' Heart is a 1964 American fictionalized biographical-musical directed by Gene Nelson and starring George Hamilton as country singer Hank Williams. It co-stars Susan Oliver and Red Buttons.

== Plot ==
In 1930s Alabama, young Hank Williams learns from Teetot to play the guitar and sing. After he drinks a tonic, Teetot suddenly dies. Years later, Hank becomes a traveling salesman. Along the way, he meets touring country singers Audrey Sheppard and Shorty Younger, two members of the Drifting Cowboys. To entice customers, Hank performs "Long Gone Lonesome Blues" at a medicine show. Audrey and Shorty invite Hank to join their group, in which Hank quits his job.

At a picnic, Hank falls in love with Audrey and performs "I Saw the Light". They marry shortly thereafter. On the road, Audrey tells Hank she secretly sent his song "Your Cheatin' Heart" to music publisher Fred Rose. However, Rose suspects he did not write the song and instructs him to write another song. After one hour, Rose returns to his office, where Hank performs "I Can't Help It (If I'm Still in Love with You)". Impressed by his performance, Rose agrees to sign Hank onto his music label and auditions him on the Louisiana Hayride radio program.

In Shreveport, Louisiana, Hank performs "Your Cheatin' Heart" with the Drifting Cowboys. Afterwards, Hank flies back to Nashville to record "Cold, Cold Heart" in studio. He is then invited to perform at the Grand Ole Opry. Before he performs, Audrey finds Hank drunk at a nearby jazz club, where she reprimands him for neglecting a prestige gig. At the Grand Ole Opry, Hank performs "Hey, Good Lookin'".

Hank's popularity soars, in which he becomes a top-charting country singer. However, his private life suffers as he becomes a chronic alcoholic. Meanwhile, Audrey gives birth to a son, Hank Jr. Joyful at the news, Hank fractures his spine while riding on horseback. Rose, concerned for Hank's well-being, cancels his touring dates until he fully recovers. Under the pressures of stardom, Hank has fights with Audrey.

After he leaves the bar, Hank meets with Shorty, who encourages him to stop drinking. By late 1952, Hank becomes sober and Rose books him for a performance on New Year's Day 1953. During his drive to Canton, Ohio, Hank stops at a country store and performs "I'm So Lonesome I Could Cry" for the local customers. On the night of the performance, Shorty informs the audience that Hank has died from heart failure. Saddened by the news, members in the audience sing "I Saw the Light" in tribute.

== Cast ==
- George Hamilton as Hank Williams
- Susan Oliver as Audrey Williams
- Red Buttons as Shorty Younger
- Arthur O'Connell as Fred Rose
- Shary Marshall as Ann Younger
- Rex Ingram as Teetot
- Chris Crosby as Sam Priddy
- Rex Holman as Charley Bybee
- Hortense Petra as Wilma, the Cashier
- Roy Engel as Joe Rauch
- Donald Losby as Young Hank Williams
- Kevin Tate as Boy Fishing

== Production ==
=== Development ===
MGM's music division owned the rights to the Hank Williams songbook. In 1956, it was announced the studio would make the movie with producer Joe Pasternak, employing Jeff Richards and June Allyson in the lead roles. Then Elvis Presley was considered as a possible star, to make his follow-up movie for MGM following Jailhouse Rock. However, Colonel Tom Parker refused.

Paul Gregory became attached as producer and wanted Steve McQueen for the lead. MGM then offered the role to Nick Adams, but he turned it down as well. According to George Hamilton, MGM then "revised their concept of the film as quickie drive-in fare that might sell some records in the South and maybe to some crossover Beverly Hillbillies fans." They assigned their film to producer Sam Katzman who specialized in low-budget fare.

In November 1963 Standford Whitmore was writing The Hank Williams Story for Katzman. The film was made with the assistance of Williams' widow Audrey and featuring the songs (Long Gone Lonesome Blues, I Saw the Light, I Can’t Help It, Your Cheatin' Heart, Cold, Cold Heart, Jambalaya (On the Bayou) and Hey, Good Lookin’) lip-synched by Hamilton but sung by Hank Williams, Jr.

=== Casting ===
Parker was friendly with George Hamilton, who had been a fan of Williams' music since his youth, knew every song Williams had written and could also play the guitar. Hamilton was under contract to MGM but says the studio "didn't see their stock company preppy playboy playing a drug addict honky-tonk crooner".

Parker introduced Hamilton to Hank Williams' ex-wife Audrey. The two got along well and Audrey lobbied on Hamilton's behalf. Hamilton said, "Audrey wanted the movie to happen, especially to make her son, Hank Williams Jr., a singing star the same way she had pushed Big Hank to stardom." The idea was that Williams Jr would dub the singing in the movie and release the soundtrack album under his name; Hamilton wanted to perform the songs himself – "that was the key to the character"—but knew the only way he would get the part was to agree to be dubbed. With Audrey's support, Hamilton got the part, his signing being announced in November 1963.

Paula Prentiss was at one stage attached as female star.

=== Filming ===
Filming started in April 1964. Hamilton says Sam Katzman ran a tight ship. "Jungle Sam cracked the whip, whacked the cane and the whole film was in the can right on time. But he gave me free rein creatively and our director... brought in something memorable, and even Sam knew it."

The end scene (when the audience is notified that Williams has died while on the way there) portrays an actual event, as one audience member stands up unprompted and begins to sing "I Saw the Light". Others stand up quickly and join him, as the spotlight shines on the stage where Hank should be. This was similar to what actually happened after Williams died, as Hawkshaw Hawkins and several musicians began singing "I Saw the Light", and the crowd joined in, thinking at first that the announcement was an act, but when Hawkins and company began singing, the crowd realized it was no act.

== Release ==
The film was originally released in 1964 in black and white, and has the distinction of being the final MGM musical film to be produced in black and white. According to Hamilton, "the movie made me a hero in the South, but because it was a small film, it didn't get the exposure it deserved in the rest of the country." Among the film's fans were Colonel Tom Parker and Hamilton's later girlfriends Lynda Bird Johnson and Alana Hamilton.

The film was colorized by Turner Entertainment in 1990. The colorized version made its debut over SuperStation WTBS on January 1, 1991, the 38th anniversary of Hank Williams, Sr.'s death. Your Cheatin' Heart was released on DVD November 9, 2010, by Warner Archive as a MOD (Manufacture On Demand) disc via Amazon (Black and White version). The colorized version has never been officially released on any form of home media.

== Reception ==
FilmInk argued Hamilton was "never convincing as a star, singer, writer or doomed person. Admittedly, he’s not helped by the slack direction or poor script, which consists of a lot of drunken acting and squabbles with his wife, played without much flair by Susan Oliver. The movie wasn’t a blockbuster, but it became beloved."
