= Audrey Williams =

American musician (1923–1975)

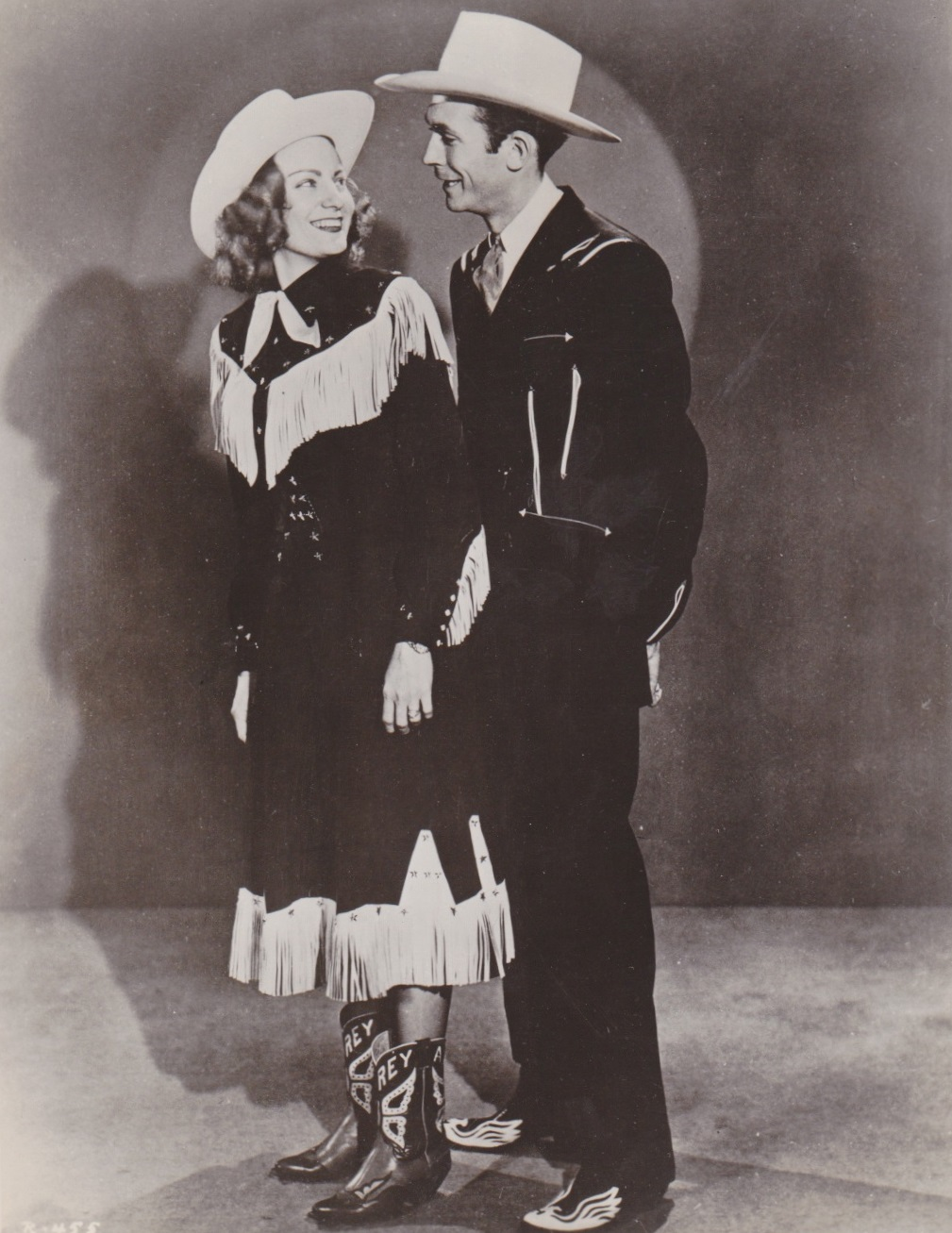
- Audrey and Hank Williams during the early 1950s

Background information
- Born: Audrey Mae Sheppard; February 28, 1923; Banks, Alabama, U.S.
- Died: November 4, 1975 (aged 52) Nashville, Tennessee, U.S.
- Genres: Country; Western; gospel; blues; honky-tonk; folk
- Occupations: Songwriter; musician
- Instrument: Singing
- Years active: 1937–1975
- Label: MGM
- Spouses: James Erskine Guy (m. 1941; div. 1944) Hank Williams (m. 1944; div. 1952)
- Children: 2, including Hank Williams Jr.

Audrey Mae Sheppard Williams (February 28, 1923 – November 4, 1975) was an American musician known for being the first wife of country music singer and songwriter Hank Williams, the mother of Hank Williams Jr., and the grandmother of Hank Williams III and Holly Williams.

== Early life and marriages ==
Audrey Sheppard was born in Banks, Alabama, to Artie Mae (née Harden; 1903–1976) and Charles "Shelton" Sheppard. She grew up on a farm owned and worked by her parents. Sheppard married her first husband, James Erskine Guy, when she was a high-school senior. On August 13, 1941, their daughter Lycrecia was born. Sheppard and Guy separated soon after.

Sheppard met Hank Williams in Andalusia, Alabama, in 1943. Despite the objections of Hank's mother and bandmates, Sheppard was added to the band as an occasional singer and upright bass player. In December 1944, the two were married 10 days after the finalization of Sheppard's divorce from Guy. The ceremony was performed by a justice of the peace at the officiant's gas station in Andalusia.

== Music career ==
Soon after their wedding, Williams took over as her husband's unofficial manager, a position previously held by his mother, Lillie Williams. The couple visited Nashville with the intent of meeting songwriter and music publisher Fred Rose of Acuff-Rose Publishing. The meeting resulted in Hank Williams recording two singles for Sterling Records: “Never Again” in December 1946 and “Honky Tonkin’” in February 1947. Both proved successful and a contract was signed with MGM Records in 1947, with Fred Rose becoming the singer's official manager and record producer.

Williams, however, began to push for her own spot in the limelight. Country-music biographer Colin Escott wrote, "Her duets with Hank were like an extension of their married life in that she fought him for dominance on every note." Having recorded several duets with her husband, Audrey was featured on the recordings of "Lost on the River", "I Heard My Mother Praying for Me", "Dear Brother", "Jesus Remembered Me", "The Pale Horse and His Rider", "Jesus Died for Me", "Help Me Understand", "Something Got a Hold of Me", "I Want to Live and Love", and "Where the Soul of Man Never Dies".

== Marriage difficulties and family ==
In early 1948, tension grew in the Williams marriage when Hank started to again abuse alcohol, a problem he brought with him to their marriage from the beginning. Audrey left her husband: she gave him the choice of alcohol or her. They eventually reunited.

On May 26, 1949, Audrey gave birth to the couple's only child, Randall Hank Williams, in Shreveport, Louisiana. When Hank expressed a desire to adopt Lycrecia, Audrey refused, fearing that he would take her if they divorced.

On December 31, 1951, after allegations of mutual infidelities and the resumption of her husband's health problems, Audrey called from a hotel and told Hank to be out of their Tennessee house by the time she returned. Replying to her with a seemingly prophetic statement, Hank stated, "Audrey, I won't live another year without you."

In June 1952, the couple divorced. She was awarded the house, their son, and half of her ex-husband's future royalties on the condition that she never remarry.

In 1953, months after Hank Sr.'s death, Audrey paid Hank's second wife, Billie Jean Jones, $30,000 to relinquish the title of "Hank Williams's Widow". Both women had been using the description professionally. Billie Jean agreed to Audrey's terms.

== Later life and death ==
Williams and her son Hank Jr. became estranged after he turned 18. She never remarried. She died of congestive heart failure on November 4, 1975 at age 52, in Nashville, Tennessee.

== Cultural references ==
=== Music ===
- Audrey is mentioned in the Johnny Cash song: "The Night Hank Williams Came to Town."
- Audrey is referenced in "Tangled Up Roses" by Shooter Jennings.
- Audrey is referenced in the Hank Williams Jr. song, "The Conversation" with Waylon Jennings.
- Audrey is referenced in the song “Everything She Ain’t” by Hailey Whitters in the line “Audrey to your Hank”.
- Audrey is referenced in "Mrs. Hank Williams" by Fred Eaglesmith.

=== Film depictions ===
- Susan Oliver played Audrey in the 1964 biopic Your Cheatin' Heart opposite George Hamilton as Hank.
- Allyn Ann McLerie played Audrey in the 1983 television biopic Living Proof: The Hank Williams Jr. Story opposite Richard Thomas as Hank Williams, Jr.
- Elizabeth Olsen played Williams in the 2015 biopic I Saw the Light opposite Tom Hiddleston.

== Discography ==
=== Singles ===
Year	Title	US Country	Label
1951	"Leave Us Women Alone"	-	MGM
1965	"They're Begging You to Stay"	-	MGM
1955	"Little Bocephus"	-	MGM
1955	"I'll Let the Telephone Ring"	-	MGM
1966	"Almost Persuaded"	-	MGM
