= Ozzfest lineups by year =

Logo used from 2000

Over the years, a variety of bands have made up the yearly lineups of Ozzfest, a yearly heavy metal music festival that usually tours the United States in summer.

== Ozzfest 1996 ==
=== Line-up ===
Main stage

- Ozzy Osbourne
- Slayer
- Danzig
- Biohazard
- Sepultura
- Fear Factory
- Neurosis
- Narcotic Gypsy

2nd stage

- Earth Crisis
- Powerman 5000
- Coal Chamber
- Cellophane
- King Norris

=== Tour dates ===
Date	City	Country	Venue
October 25, 1996	Phoenix	United States	Blockbuster Desert Sky Pavilion
October 26, 1996	San Bernardino	United States	Glen Helen Blockbuster Pavilion

== Ozzfest 1997 ==
Ozzfest 1997 Tour
- Tour by Black Sabbath, Ozzy Osbourne, Marilyn Manson and more
- Location: North America
- Start date: May 24, 1997
- End date: July 1, 1997
- Legs: 1
- No. of shows: 22
Black Sabbath tour chronology
Forbidden Tour (1995)	Ozzfest Tour (1997)	European Tour (1998)
Ozzy Osbourne tour chronology
Retirement Sucks Tour (1995–1996)	Ozzfest Tour (1997)	The Ozzman Cometh Tour (1998)
Marilyn Manson tour chronology
Smells Like Children (1995–1996)	Dead to the World (1996–1997); Ozzfest Tour (1997)	Mechanical Animals (1998–1999)

=== Line-up ===
Main stage

- Black Sabbath
- Ozzy Osbourne
- Marilyn Manson (Added to the line-up on June 15)
- Pantera
- Type O Negative
- Fear Factory
- Machine Head - were on second stage at the East Rutherford show and got cut off by Black Sabbath intro

2nd stage

- Powerman 5000
- Slo Burn
- Drain STH
- downset.
- Neurosis
- Vision of Disorder
- Coal Chamber

"That whole tour was like the Morbid Tour – it was a funeral on wheels," quipped Sabbath bassist Geezer Butler. "Every band was wearing black." "I'd have liked to have done a long set, as opposed to fifty minutes or an hour," remarked guitarist Tony Iommi. "For me it didn't feel like we'd done enough."

=== Tour dates ===
Date	City	Country	Venue
May 24, 1997	Bristow	United States	Nissan Pavilion
May 26, 1997	West Palm Beach	United States	Coral Sky Amphitheatre
May 28, 1997	Charlotte	United States	Blockbuster Pavilion Charlotte
May 31, 1997	San Antonio	United States	Alamodome
June 1, 1997	Dallas	United States	Starplex Amphitheatre
June 3, 1997	Cuyahoga Falls	United States	Blossom Music Center
June 4, 1997	Noblesville	United States	Deer Creek Music Center
June 7, 1997	Burgettstown	United States	Star Lake Amphitheatre
June 8, 1997	Camden	United States	Blockbuster-Sony Music Entertainment Center
June 10, 1997	Maryland Heights	United States	Riverport Amphitheatre
June 12, 1997	Clarkston	United States	Pine Knob Music Theatre
June 14, 1997	Mansfield	United States	Great Woods Amphitheater
June 15, 1997	East Rutherford	United States	Giants Stadium
~~June 17, 1997~~	~~Columbus~~	United States	~~Polaris Amphitheater~~ [see below]
June 19, 1997	Tinley Park	United States	New World Music Theatre
June 21, 1997	East Troy	United States	Alpine Valley Music Theatre
June 22, 1997	Minneapolis	United States	Metrodome
June 24, 1997	Denver	United States	Mile High Stadium
June 26, 1997	Phoenix	United States	Blockbuster Desert Sky Pavilion
June 28, 1997	Las Vegas	United States	Thomas & Mack Center
June 29, 1997	San Bernardino	United States	Glen Helen Blockbuster Pavilion
July 1, 1997	Columbus	United States	Polaris Amphitheater (Black Sabbath and Ozzy Osbourne only)

The Columbus show was cancelled when Osbourne lost his voice. "They wanted me to go on and announce that Ozzy wasn't going to be there," Tony Iommi recalled. "I said, 'You've got no chance of that!' There was no way I'm walking out there saying we're not playing… Pantera were a particularly great bunch of guys and they went out and jammed away. Ozzy's band as well – they were nice people. When they [the audience] were told that we weren't going to be playing at the end and Ozzy wasn't going to be showing up, they just fucking wrecked the place… We had to reschedule it [for July 1]."

== Ozzfest 1998 ==
=== United Kingdom line-up ===
Main stage

- Black Sabbath
- Ozzy Osbourne
- Foo Fighters
- Pantera
- Soulfly
- Slayer
- Fear Factory
- Therapy? (Replaced Korn)
- Korn (Canceled)

2nd stage

- Coal Chamber
- Life of Agony
- Human Waste Project
- Hed PE
- Entombed
- Pitchshifter

=== United States line-up ===
==== Line-up ====
Main stage

- Ozzy Osbourne
- Tool
- Megadeth
- Limp Bizkit
- Soulfly
- Sevendust
- Coal Chamber

2nd stage

- Motörhead
- Melvins
- Incubus
- Snot
- Ultraspank
- Life of Agony
- Kilgore
- Monster Voodoo Machine
- System of a Down

=== Tour dates ===
Date	City	Country	Venue	Tickets sold / Available	Revenue
93X Fest (Warm-up show)
May 23, 1998	Somerset	United States	Float Rite Park Amphitheater (Ozzy only)		
Europe
May 29, 1998	Nuremberg	Germany	Frankenstadion (Rock im Park)		
May 31, 1998	Nürburg	Germany	Nürburgring (Rock am Ring)		
June 1, 1998	Berlin	Germany	Berlin Arena (Ozzfest Germany)		
June 3, 1998	Budapest	Hungary	Kisstadion (without Ozzy's band)		
June 4, 1998	Vienna	Austria	Libro Music Hall (Ozzfest Austria)		
June 6, 1998	Milan	Italy	Forum di Assago (Gods of Metal without Ozzy's band)		
June 9, 1998	Prague	Czech Republic	Slavia Athletic Stadium (without Ozzy's band)		
June 10, 1998	Katowice	Poland	Spodek (without Ozzy's band)		
June 13, 1998	Hultsfred	Sweden	Hultsfred Rural Park (Hultsfred Festival without Ozzy's band)		
June 14, 1998	Seinäjoki	Finland	Tornava Open Air Theater (Provinssirock without Ozzy's band)		
~~June 17, 1998~~	~~Oslo~~	~~Norway~~	~~Spectrum Arena (without Ozzy's band)~~		
June 20, 1998	Milton Keynes	England	Milton Keynes Bowl (Ozzfest England)	47,009 / 50,000	$2,140,027
June 22, 1998	San Sebastián	Spain	Velódromo de Anoeta (Anoeta Rock Festival)		
June 25, 1998	Roskilde	Denmark	Roskilde Festival Grounds (Roskilde Festival without Ozzy's band)		
June 27, 1998	St. Gallen	Switzerland	Sittertobel (St. Gallen Open Air Festival without Ozzy's band)		
June 28, 1998	Dessel	Belgium	Dessel Boeretang (Graspop Metal Meeting without Ozzy's band)		
June 30, 1998	Oslo	Norway	Oslo Spektrum (without Ozzy's band)		
North America
July 3, 1998	Holmdel	United States	PNC Bank Arts Center		
July 5, 1998	Holmdel	United States	PNC Bank Arts Center		
July 7, 1998	Mansfield	United States	Great Woods Amphitheater		
July 9, 1998	Mansfield	United States	Great Woods Amphitheater		
July 11, 1998	Camden	United States	Blockbuster-Sony Music Entertainment Center		
July 12, 1998	Burgettstown	United States	Star Lake Amphitheatre		
July 14, 1998	Akron	United States	Rubber Bowl		
July 16, 1998	Noblesville	United States	Deer Creek Music Center		
July 18, 1998	Somerset	United States	Float Rite Park Amphitheatre		
July 19, 1998	East Troy	United States	Alpine Valley Music Theatre		
July 21, 1998	Columbus	United States	Polaris Amphitheatre		
July 23, 1998	Clarkston	United States	Pine Knob Music Theatre		
July 25, 1998	Maryland Heights	United States	Riverport Amphitheatre		
July 26, 1998	Bonner Springs	United States	Sandstone Amphitheater		
July 29, 1998	Orlando	United States	Central Florida Fairgrounds		
July 30, 1998	West Palm Beach	United States	Coral Sky Amphitheatre		
August 1, 1998	Raleigh	United States	Hardee's Walnut Creek Amphitheatre		
August 2, 1998	Bristow	United States	Nissan Pavilion		

==== Information ====
The concert on July 18, 1998, at Float Rite Park was merged with Warped Tour 1998. Some 39,000 fans were at the 12-hour, six-stage, 48-band event.

== Ozzfest 1999 ==
=== Line-up ===
Main stage

- Black Sabbath
- Rob Zombie
- Deftones
- Slayer
- Primus featuring Buckethead
- System of a Down
- Godsmack
- Static-X

2nd stage

- Drain STH
- Fear Factory
- Hed PE
- Slipknot
- Pushmonkey
- Puya
- Flashpoint
- Apartment 26

=== Tour dates ===
Ozzfest 1999 Tour
- Tour by Black Sabbath, Rob Zombie, Slayer, Slipknot and more
- Location: North America
- Start date: May 27, 1999
- End date: July 24, 1999
- Legs: 1
- No. of shows: 29
Black Sabbath tour chronology
Reunion Tour (1998–99)	Ozzfest Tour (1999)	US Tour (1999)
Rob Zombie tour chronology
?	Ozzfest Tour (1999)	Merry Mayhem Tour (2001)
Slipknot tour chronology
N/A	Ozzfest Tour (1999)	Livin la Vida Loco (1999)

Date	City	Country	Venue	Tickets sold / Available	Revenue
May 27, 1999	West Palm Beach	United States	Coral Sky Amphitheater		
May 29, 1999	Atlanta	United States	Lakewood Amphitheatre	14,779 / 15,681	$730,834
May 31, 1999	Antioch	United States	First American Music Center		
June 2, 1999	Charlotte	United States	Blockbuster Pavilion Charlotte		
June 4, 1999	Bristow	United States	Nissan Pavilion		
June 6, 1999	Camden	United States	Blockbuster-Sony Music Entertainment Center		
June 8, 1999	Holmdel	United States	PNC Bank Arts Center		
June 10, 1999	Holmdel	United States	PNC Bank Arts Center		
June 12, 1999	Burgettstown	United States	Star Lake Amphitheatre		
June 14, 1999	Columbus	United States	Polaris Amphitheatre		
June 16, 1999	Mansfield	United States	Tweeter Amphitheater		
June 18, 1999	Mansfield	United States	Tweeter Amphitheater		
June 19, 1999	Hartford	United States	Meadows Music Theater		
June 22, 1999	Montreal	Canada	Centre Molson		
June 25, 1999	Clarkston	United States	Pine Knob Music Theatre	31,462 / 31,462	$1,512,176
June 27, 1999	Clarkston	United States	Pine Knob Music Theatre	31,462 / 31,462	$1,512,176
June 29, 1999	Noblesville	United States	Deer Creek Music Center		
July 1, 1999	Somerset	United States	Float Rite Park Amphitheatre		
July 3, 1999	East Troy	United States	Alpine Valley Music Theatre	29,809 / 29,809	$1,032,130
July 5, 1999	Tinley Park	United States	New World Music Theatre	18,301 / 28,000	$720,190
July 7, 1999	Maryland Heights	United States	Riverport Amphitheatre		
July 9, 1999	Bonner Springs	United States	Sandstone Amphitheatre		
July 11, 1999	San Antonio	United States	Retama Park Polo Grounds		
July 13, 1999	Dallas	United States	Starplex Amphitheatre		
July 16, 1999	Vancouver	Canada	Thunderbird Stadium	16,894 / 30,000	$679,474
July 18, 1999	George	United States	The Gorge Amphitheatre	20,000 / 20,000	$1,171,000
July 20, 1999	Mountain View	United States	Shoreline Amphitheatre		
July 22, 1999	Phoenix	United States	Blockbuster Desert Sky Pavilion	19,332 / 20,143	$799,337
July 24, 1999	San Bernardino	United States	Glen Helen Blockbuster Pavilion	47,969 / 47,969	$1,438,393

== Ozzfest 2000 ==
=== Line-up ===
Main stage

- Ozzy Osbourne
- Pantera
- Godsmack
- Static-X
- Incubus
- Methods of Mayhem
- P.O.D.
- Queens of the Stone Age (missed August 24 through August 30)
- Black Label Society (replaced QOTSA from August 24 through August 30)
- Apartment 26 (starting August 4)

2nd stage

- Soulfly
- Kittie
- Disturbed
- Taproot
- Pitchshifter
- Slaves on Dope
- Reveille
- Shuvel
- Primer 55
- The Deadlights
- Crazy Town (until July 8)
- Pumpjack (starting August 4)

Just before the tour, Soulfly took the place of Ministry amidst a management changeover. The lineup on the Main Stage and 2nd Stage changed further shortly after the tour began when Crazy Town was pulled from the tour by the band's manager. Disturbed was moved to open the Main Stage.

=== Tour dates ===
Ozzfest 2000 Tour
- Tour by Ozzy Osbourne, Pantera and more
- Location: North America
- Start date: July 2, 2000
- End date: September 2, 2000
- Legs: 1
- No. of shows: 29
Ozzy Osbourne tour chronology
The Ozzman Cometh Tour (1998)	Ozzfest Tour (2000)	Merry Mayhem Tour (2001)

Date	City	Country	Venue
July 2, 2000	West Palm Beach	United States	Mars Music Amphitheatre
July 4, 2000	Atlanta	United States	Lakewood Amphitheatre
July 6, 2000	Antioch	United States	AmSouth Amphitheatre
July 8, 2000	Charlotte	United States	Blockbuster Pavilion Charlotte
July 10, 2000	Virginia Beach	United States	GTE Virginia Beach Amphitheatre
July 12, 2000	Clarkston	United States	Pine Knob Music Theatre
July 14, 2000	Bristow	United States	Nissan Pavilion
July 16, 2000	Burgettstown	United States	Post-Gazette Pavilion
July 18, 2000	Columbus	United States	Polaris Amphitheater
July 20, 2000	Cuyahoga Falls	United States	Blossom Music Center
July 22, 2000	Camden	United States	Blockbuster Sony Entertainment Center
July 24, 2000	Holmdel	United States	PNC Bank Arts Center
July 26, 2000	Saratoga Springs	United States	Saratoga Springs Performing Arts Center
July 29, 2000	Mansfield	United States	Tweeter Center Boston
July 30, 2000	Mansfield	United States	Tweeter Center Boston
August 4, 2000	Tinley Park	United States	New World Music Theatre
August 6, 2000	East Troy	United States	Alpine Valley Music Theatre
August 8, 2000	Cincinnati	United States	Riverbend Music Center
August 10, 2000	Noblesville	United States	Deer Creek Music Center
August 12, 2000	Somerset	United States	Float Rite Park Amphitheatre
August 14, 2000	Maryland Heights	United States	Riverport Amphitheatre
August 16, 2000	Bonner Springs	United States	Sandstone Amphitheater
August 18, 2000	Dallas	United States	Starplex Amphitheatre
August 20, 2000	Baytown	United States	Houston Raceway Park
August 24, 2000	George	United States	The Gorge Amphitheatre
August 26, 2000	Mountain View	United States	Shoreline Amphitheatre
August 28, 2000	Wheatland	United States	Sacramento Valley Amphitheatre
August 30, 2000	Phoenix	United States	Blockbuster Desert Sky Pavilion
September 2, 2000	San Bernardino	United States	Glen Helen Blockbuster Pavilion

== Ozzfest 2001 ==
=== United Kingdom ===
Main stage

- Black Sabbath
- Slipknot
- Tool
- Papa Roach
- Soulfly
- Hed PE
- Raging Speedhorn

2nd stage

- Disturbed
- Amen
- Mudvayne
- Black Label Society
- Pure Rubbish
- Apartment 26
- The Union Underground

=== United States ===
Main stage

- Black Sabbath
- Marilyn Manson
- Slipknot
- Papa Roach
- Linkin Park
- Disturbed
- Crazy Town
- Black Label Society

2nd stage

- Mudvayne
- The Union Underground (cancelled on June 30)
- Taproot
- Systematic (last show on July 13)
- Nonpoint
- Drowning Pool (cancelled on June 30)
- Spineshank (started on June 30)
- Hatebreed (cancelled on June 18)
- American Head Charge
  (replaced by Slaves on Dope on July 24)

Streetwise Stage

- Godhead (last show on June 30)
- Otep (last show on July 13)
- No One (Started on July 14) (replaced by Project Wyze on July 24)
- Pure Rubbish
- Beautiful Creatures
- Pressure 4-5 (Started July 14)

=== Tour dates ===
Ozzfest 2001 Tour
- Tour by Black Sabbath, Marilyn Manson and more
- Location: Europe and North America
- Start date: May 26, 2001
- End date: August 12, 2001
- Legs: 1
- No. of shows: 32
Black Sabbath tour chronology
European Tour (1999)	Ozzfest Tour (2001)	Ozzfest Tour (2004)
Marilyn Manson tour chronology
Rock Is Dead Tour (1995–1996)	Guns, God and Government (2000–2001); Ozzfest Tour (2001)	Grotesk Burlesk Tour (2003–2004)

Date	City	Country	Venue	Tickets sold / Available	Revenue
Europe (Ozzfest UK)
May 26, 2001	Milton Keynes	England	Milton Keynes Bowl		
North America
June 8, 2001	Tinley Park	United States	Tweeter Center Chicago		
June 9, 2001	East Troy	United States	Alpine Valley Music Theatre		
June 12, 2001	Noblesville	United States	Verizon Wireless Music Center		
June 16, 2001	Somerset	United States	Float Rite Park Amphitheatre		
June 18, 2001	Maryland Heights	United States	Riverport Amphitheatre		
June 19, 2001	Bonner Springs	United States	Sandstone Amphitheater		
June 21, 2001	Denver	United States	Mile High Stadium		
June 25, 2001	George	United States	The Gorge Amphitheatre		
June 27, 2001	Wheatland	United States	Sacramento Valley Amphitheatre		
June 29, 2001	Mountain View	United States	Shoreline Amphitheatre		
June 30, 2001	San Bernardino	United States	Blockbuster Pavilion	54,575 / 60,904	$2,205,932
July 3, 2001	Selma	United States	Verizon Wireless Amphitheater		
July 5, 2001	Dallas	United States	Smirnoff Music Center		
July 7, 2001	Atlanta	United States	Hi-Fi Buys Amphitheater		
July 9, 2001	Camden	United States	Tweeter Center		
July 13, 2001	West Palm Beach	United States	Mars Music Amphitheatre		
July 14, 2001	St. Petersburg	United States	Tropicana Field		
July 17, 2001	Charlotte	United States	Verizon Wireless Amphitheatre		
July 20, 2001	Bristow	United States	Nissan Pavilion		
July 21, 2001	Camden	United States	Tweeter Center		
July 24, 2001	Toronto	Canada	The Docks		
July 26, 2001	Cuyahoga Falls	United States	Blossom Music Center		
July 28, 2001	Burgettstown	United States	Post-Gazette Pavilion		
July 30, 2001	Clarkston	United States	DTE Energy Music Theatre	30,638 / 30,638	$1,807,377
July 31, 2001	Clarkston	United States	DTE Energy Music Theatre	30,638 / 30,638	$1,807,377
August 3, 2001	Columbus	United States	Polaris Amphitheater		
August 5, 2001	Hartford	United States	ctnow.com Meadows Music Theatre		
August 7, 2001	Mansfield	United States	Tweeter Center	34,073 / 39,600	$1,657,269
August 8, 2001	Mansfield	United States	Tweeter Center	34,073 / 39,600	$1,657,269
August 11, 2001	Holmdel	United States	PNC Bank Arts Center		
August 12, 2001	Holmdel	United States	PNC Bank Arts Center		

== Ozzfest 2002 ==
=== Germany & Belgium line-ups ===
May 17–18

- Ozzy Osbourne
- Tool
- System of a Down
- Bad Religion
- P.O.D.
- Drowning Pool
- Black Label Society

May 20

- Ozzy Osbourne
- Tool
- Bad Religion
- Black Label Society
- Oomph!
- Such a Surge

May 23

- Ozzy Osbourne
- Tool
- System of a Down

=== England ===
Main stage

- Ozzy Osbourne
- Tool
- System of a Down
- Slayer
- Lostprophets
- Millencolin
- Cradle of Filth
- Drowning Pool
- The Mad Capsule Markets
- Black Label Society
- AntiProduct

2nd stage

- Hundred Reasons
- Ill Niño
- Kittie
- American Head Charge
- Mushroomhead
- Otep
- Cyclefly
- Hell is for Heroes
- Danko Jones
- Flaw
- Skindred
- Nonpoint
- Pulse Ultra

=== Ireland ===
Main stage

- Ozzy Osbourne (cancelled)
- Tool
- System of a Down
- Slayer
- Therapy?
- Lostprophets
- Drowning Pool
- Cyclefly
- Black Label Society (cancelled)

2nd stage

- Kittie
- American Head Charge
- Ill Niño
- Mushroomhead
- Hell Is for Heroes
- Pulse Ultra
- Flaw
- Otep
- AntiProduct
- Skindive
- Superskin

=== Poland & Czech Republic ===
May 29

- Ozzy Osbourne
- Tool
- Slayer
- AntiProduct
- Decapitated

May 30

- Ozzy Osbourne
- Slayer
- Tool
- AntiProduct
- Metalium
- Royal Playboy Cartel
- Škwor
- Astro Metro

=== Netherlands ===
Main stage

- Ozzy Osbourne
- Tool
- Slayer
- Within Temptation
- Kittie
- Ill Niño
- Drowning Pool

2nd stage

- American Head Charge
- Dreadlock Pussy
- Mushroomhead
- SOiL
- .calibre
- After Forever
- Otep
- AntiProduct

Local Stage

- Nomen
- Outburst
- Wicked Mystic
- Callenish Circle
- Dimension Seven
- Smogus
- Agresión

=== Portugal ===
- Ozzy Osbourne (cancelled)
- Tool
- Slayer
- Ill Niño
- Kittie
- Drowning Pool
- AntiProduct
- 500 & Crave
- Ramp

=== United States ===
Main stage

- Ozzy Osbourne
- System of a Down
- Rob Zombie
- P.O.D.

Meshuggah

- Drowning Pool (cancelled on August 14 after death of lead singer Dave Williams)
- Adema
- Black Label Society
- Tommy Lee (started August 22)

2nd stage

- Down
- Hatebreed
- Meshuggah
- Soil (Ended on August 8)
- Flaw (Ended August 8)
- 3rd Strike (Ended August 8)
- Pulse Ultra
- Ill Niño
- Andrew W.K. (Ended August 10)
- Glassjaw (Started August 10)
- The Used (Started August 11)
- Switched (Started August 10)
- Otep
- Lostprophets
- The Apex Theory
- Neurotica
- Chevelle
- Mushroomhead (Started August 10)
- Seether (Started August 10 + Appeared July 13)

=== Tour dates ===
Date	City	Country	Venue	Tickets sold / Available	Revenue
Europe
May 17, 2002	Nuremberg	Germany	Frankenstadion (Rock im Park)		
May 19, 2002	Nürburg	Germany	Nürburgring (Rock am Ring)		
May 20, 2002	Braunschweig	Germany	Volkswagen Halle (Ozzfest Germany)		
May 23, 2002	Antwerp	Belgium	Sportpaleis (Ozzfest Belgium)		
May 25, 2002	Castle Donington	England	Donington Park (Ozzfest England)		
~~May 26, 2002~~	~~Naas~~	~~Ireland~~	~~Punchestown Racecourse (Ozzfest Ireland)~~		
May 29, 2002	Katowice	Poland	Spodek (Ozzfest Poland)		
May 30, 2002	Prague	Czech Republic	Strahov Stadium (Ozzfest Czech Republic)		
June 1, 2002	Nijmegen	Netherlands	Stadion de Goffert (Ozzfest Netherlands)		
~~June 4, 2002~~	~~Lisbon~~	~~Portugal~~	~~Estádio do Restelo (Ozzfest Portugal)~~		
~~June 7, 2002~~	~~Milan~~	~~Italy~~	~~Filaforum (Ozzfest Italy)~~		
~~June 8, 2002~~	~~Zürich~~	~~Switzerland~~	~~Hallenstadion (Ozzfest Switzerland)~~		
~~June 10, 2002~~	~~Copenhagen~~	~~Denmark~~	~~Valby-Hallen (Ozzfest Denmark)~~		
~~June 11, 2002~~	~~Stockholm~~	~~Sweden~~	~~Ericsson Globe (Ozzfest Sweden)~~		
~~June 13, 2002~~	~~Helsinki~~	~~Finland~~	~~Hartwell Arena (Ozzfest Finland)~~		
~~June 15, 2002~~	~~Saint Petersburg~~	~~Russia~~	~~? (Ozzfest Saint Petersburg)~~		
~~June 16, 2002~~	~~Moscow~~	~~Russia~~	~~? (Ozzfest Moscow)~~		
North America
~~July 6, 2002~~	~~Bristow~~	United States	~~Nissan Pavilion~~		
~~July 7, 2002~~	~~Burgettstown~~	United States	~~Post-Gazette Pavilion~~		
July 10, 2002	Scranton	United States	Ford Pavilion	13,075 / 17,417	$613,302
July 12, 2002	Camden	United States	Tweeter Center	24,874 / 24,874	$1,079,643
July 13, 2002	Hartford	United States	Meadows Music Center	21,933 / 22,425	$1,076,204
July 16, 2002	Mansfield	United States	Tweeter Center	35,089 / 38,000	$1,813,858
July 17, 2002	Mansfield	United States	Tweeter Center	35,089 / 38,000	$1,813,858
July 19, 2002	Holmdel	United States	PNC Bank Arts Center	30,901 / 33,895	$1,834,452
July 20, 2002	Holmdel	United States	PNC Bank Arts Center	30,901 / 33,895	$1,834,452
July 24, 2002	Burgettstown	United States	Post-Gazette Pavilion	21,371 / 23,273	$878,796
July 26, 2002	West Palm Beach	United States	Mars Music Amphitheatre	17,805 / 19,771	$917,344
July 28, 2002	Atlanta	United States	Hi-Fi Buys Amphitheater	14,270 / 19,000	$818,126
~~August 3, 2002~~	~~Columbus~~	United States	~~Polaris Amphitheater~~	16,852 / 20,000	$794,845
August 4, 2002	Cuyahoga Falls	United States	Blossom Music Center	11,769 / 20,000	$571,961
August 7, 2002	Clarkston	United States	DTE Energy Music Theatre	28,092 / 30,404	$1,565,845
August 8, 2002	Clarkston	United States	DTE Energy Music Theatre	28,092 / 30,404	$1,565,845
August 10, 2002	Tinley Park	United States	Tweeter Center Chicago	24,819 / 28,429	$1,110,563
August 11, 2002	East Troy	United States	Alpine Valley Music Theatre	25,297 / 35,103	$569,747
August 13, 2002	Noblesville	United States	Verizon Wireless Music Center	20,592 / 24,044	$908,407
~~August 14, 2002~~	Bristow	United States	Nissan Pavilion		
August 15, 2002	Bristow	United States	Nissan Pavilion	21,468 / 24,907	$1,078,605
August 17, 2002	Somerset	United States	Float Rite Park Amphitheatre		
August 19, 2002	Maryland Heights	United States	UMB Bank Pavilion	13,707 / 21,205	$672,302
August 20, 2002	Bonner Springs	United States	Verizon Wireless Amphitheater Kansas City	11,320 / 18,000	$531,581
August 22, 2002	Denver	United States	Pepsi Center	10,454 / 14,560	$790,723
August 24, 2002	Wheatland	United States	AutoWest Amphitheatre	19,384 / 19,711	$1,090,008
August 25, 2002	Mountain View	United States	Shoreline Amphitheatre		
August 27, 2002	George	United States	The Gorge Amphitheatre	20,000 / 20,000	$1,235,000
August 31, 2002	San Bernardino	United States	Glen Helen Blockbuster Pavilion	44,738 / 60,000	$2,054,071
September 2, 2002	Chula Vista	United States	Coors Amphitheatre	11,596 / 17,439	$628,164
September 5, 2002	Phoenix	United States	Cricket Wireless Pavilion	15,403 / 19,671	$733,007
September 7, 2002	Selma	United States	Verizon Wireless Amphitheater	19,453 / 19,982	$1,018,104
September 8, 2002	Dallas	United States	Smirnoff Music Center	14,761 / 20,000	$750,986

== Ozzfest 2003 ==
Main stage

- Ozzy Osbourne
- Korn
- Marilyn Manson
- Disturbed
- Chevelle
- The Datsuns (from 07/20 to 07/30)

Second stage

- Cradle of Filth
- Voivod
- Hotwire
- Shadows Fall
- Grade 8 (cancelled after August 11)
- Twisted Method
- Nothingface (cancelled after August 15)
- Killswitch Engage
- Ünloco
- Depswa (cancelled after August 11)
- Motograter
- Sworn Enemy
- The Revolution Smile
- Chimaira (started July 30)
- E.Town Concrete (started August 14)
- Endo
- Memento

Date	City	Country	Venue	Tickets sold / Available	Revenue
June 28, 2003	Selma	United States	Verizon Wireless Amphitheater	18,333 / 19,982	$936,343
June 29, 2003	Dallas	United States	Smirnoff Music Center	15,047 / 19,382	$924,401
July 2, 2003	Phoenix	United States	Cricket Pavilion	19,714 / 19,714	$786,405
July 3, 2003	Chula Vista	United States	Coors Amphitheatre	12,895 / 15,000	$711,246
July 5, 2003	San Bernardino	United States	Hyundai Pavilion	27,473 / 44,637	$1,445,289
July 8, 2003	San Francisco	United States	Shoreline Amphitheatre		
July 9, 2003	Wheatland	United States	Sleep Train Amphitheatre	12,756 / 19,711	$653,888
July 12, 2003	Auburn	United States	White River Amphitheatre	13,957 / 19,536	$792,072
July 15, 2003	Albuquerque	United States	Journal Pavilion		
July 17, 2003	Maryland Heights	United States	UMB Bank Pavilion	14,434 / 21,218	$674,579
July 19, 2003	Somerset	United States	Float-Rite Park		
July 20, 2003	Tinley Park	United States	Tweeter Center Chicago	21,358 / 28,486	$979,202
July 22, 2003	Cuyahoga Falls	United States	Blossom Music Center		
July 24, 2003	Clarkston	United States	DTE Energy Music Theatre	28,799 / 30,404	$1,602,356
July 25, 2003	Clarkston	United States	DTE Energy Music Theatre	28,799 / 30,404	$1,602,356
July 30, 2003	Burgettstown	United States	Post-Gazette Pavilion	22,556 / 23,255	$878,905
July 31, 2003	Noblesville	United States	Verizon Wireless Music Center	21,119 / 24,131	$910,613
August 2, 2003	East Troy	United States	Alpine Valley Music Theatre	25,104 / 35,118	$1,073,458
August 3, 2003	Columbus	United States	Polaris Amphitheater		
August 5, 2003	Scranton	United States	Ford Pavilion	12,090 / 17,217	$554,396
August 7, 2003	Camden	United States	Tweeter Center at the Waterfront	24,317 / 25,371	$1,097,869
August 9, 2003	Hartford	United States	Meadows Music Theatre	19,605 / 24,620	$915,729
August 11, 2003	Corfu	United States	Darien Lake Performing Arts Center	11,358 / 20,111	$629,315
August 14, 2003	Mansfield	United States	Tweeter Center	29,960 / 39,800	$1,465,482
August 15, 2003	Mansfield	United States	Tweeter Center	29,960 / 39,800	$1,465,482
August 18, 2003	Holmdel	United States	PNC Bank Arts Center	26,655 / 33,888	$1,467,649
August 19, 2003	Holmdel	United States	PNC Bank Arts Center	26,655 / 33,888	$1,467,649
August 22, 2003	Bristow	United States	Nissan Pavilion	20,509 / 23,563	$1,055,832
August 24, 2003	Charlotte	United States	Verizon Wireless Amphitheatre	16,563 / 18,855	$729,339
August 26, 2003	Atlanta	United States	HiFi Buys Amphitheatre	9,872 / 19,000	$519,029
August 28, 2003	West Palm Beach	United States	Sound Advice Amphitheatre	14,939 / 19,238	$754,848

== Ozzfest 2004 ==
Ozzfest 2004 Tour
- Tour by Black Sabbath, Judas Priest, Slayer, Slipknot and more
- Location: North America
- Start date: July 10, 2004
- End date: September 4, 2004
- Legs: 1
- No. of shows: 26
Black Sabbath tour chronology
Ozzfest Tour (2001)	Ozzfest Tour (2004)	European Tour (2005)
Judas Priest tour chronology
Demolition Tour (2001–2002)	Reunited Tour (2004); Ozzfest Tour (2004)	Retribution Tour (2005)
Slipknot tour chronology
Iowa World Tour (2001–2002)	The Subliminal Verses World Tour (2004–2005); Ozzfest Tour (2004)	All Hope Is Gone World Tour (2008–2009)

- Main stage:

Black Sabbath, Judas Priest, Slayer, Dimmu Borgir, Superjoint Ritual, Black Label Society

- Second stage:

Slipknot, Hatebreed, Lamb of God, Atreyu, Bleeding Through, Lacuna Coil, Every Time I Die, Unearth, God Forbid, Otep, Devildriver, Magna-Fi, Throwdown, Darkest Hour

Date	City	Country	Venue	Tickets sold / Available	Revenue
July 10, 2004	Hartford	United States	CTNow.com Meadows Music	20,338 / 24,482	$904,261
July 12, 2004	Mansfield	United States	Tweeter Center Boston	19,900 / 19,900	$1,046,785
July 14, 2004	Wantagh	United States	Jones Beach Theater	12,345 / 13,899	$786,754
July 16, 2004	Holmdel	United States	PNC Bank Arts Center	16,963 / 16,963	$990,664
July 18, 2004	Bristow	United States	Nissan Pavilion	18,831 / 23,389	$908,363
July 20, 2004	Columbus	United States	Germain Amphitheater	12,213 / 20,000	$523,977
July 22, 2004	Antioch	United States	Starwood Amphitheatre	15,340 / 18,829	$541,892
July 24, 2004	Greenwood Village	United States	Coors Amphitheatre		
July 27, 2004	Auburn	United States	White River Amphitheatre	16,841 / 19,536	$831,094
July 29, 2004	Mountain View	United States	Shoreline Amphitheatre	23,679 / 23,850	$962,863
July 31, 2004	San Bernardino	United States	Hyundai Pavilion	45,000 / 45,000	$1,634,479
August 3, 2004	Albuquerque	United States	Journal Pavilion	14,171 / 14,171	$807,667
August 5, 2004	Dallas	United States	Smirnoff Music Center		
August 7, 2004	Selma	United States	Verizon Wireless Amphitheater	18,926 / 19,262	$894,282
August 10, 2004	Bonner Springs	United States	Verizon Wireless Amphitheater Kansas City		
August 12, 2004	Maryland Heights	United States	UMB Bank Pavilion		
August 14, 2004	East Troy	United States	Alpine Valley Music Theatre	21,611 / 34,973	$903,583
August 17, 2004	Clarkston	United States	DTE Energy Music Theatre	16,957 / 17,202	$862,208
August 19, 2004	Cuyahoga Falls	United States	Blossom Music Center		
August 21, 2004	Tinley Park	United States	Tweeter Center Chicago	22,570 / 28,636	$1,011,645
August 24, 2004	Noblesville	United States	Verizon Wireless Music Center	12,557 / 24,440	$588,695
August 26, 2004	Camden	United States	Tweeter Center at the Waterfront	24,951 / 24,951	$1,143,422
August 28, 2004	Burgettstown	United States	Post-Gazette Pavilion	21,354 / 23,121	$814,899
August 31, 2004	Raleigh	United States	Alltel Pavilion at Walnut Creek		
September 2, 2004	Tampa	United States	Tampa Bay Amphitheatre		
September 4, 2004	West Palm Beach	United States	~~Sound Advice Amphitheatre~~ (cancelled due to Hurricane Frances)		

== Ozzfest 2005 ==
=== UK (Download Festival) ===
The Saturday (11 June) of the Download Festival at Donington Park was dubbed "Ozzfest Day", featuring Black Sabbath, Velvet Revolver, HIM, Anthrax, Alter Bridge, A, Bowling for Soup, The Mad Capsule Markets, The Dwarves and Trivium.

=== United States ===
Ozzfest 2005 Tour
- Tour by Black Sabbath, Iron Maiden, Slipknot and more
- Location: North America
- Start date: July 15, 2005
- End date: September 4, 2005
- Legs: 1
- No. of shows: 27
Black Sabbath tour chronology
European Tour (2005)	Ozzfest Tour (2005)	Black Sabbath Reunion Tour (2012–2014)
Iron Maiden tour chronology
Dance of Death World Tour (2003–2004)	Eddie Rips Up the World Tour (2005); Ozzfest Tour (2005)	A Matter of Life and Death Tour (2006–2007)

- Main stage:

Black Sabbath, Iron Maiden (from July 15 – August 20), Mudvayne, Shadows Fall, Black Label Society, In Flames, Velvet Revolver (from August 23 – September 4), Slipknot (July 31 and August 20 only), Drowning Pool (August 25 only),

- Second stage:

Rob Zombie, Killswitch Engage, As I Lay Dying, Mastodon, A Dozen Furies, The Haunted, Arch Enemy, The Black Dahlia Murder, Bury Your Dead, It Dies Today, Soilwork, Gizmachi, Wicked Wisdom, Trivium

Date	City	Country	Venue	Tickets sold / Available	Revenue
July 15, 2005	Mansfield	United States	Tweeter Center Boston	20,100 / 20,100	$1,152,356
July 17, 2005	Hartford	United States	Meadows Music Theater	20,430 / 24,482	$842,248
July 19, 2005	Camden	United States	Tweeter Center at the Waterfront	23,655 / 25,371	$982,538
July 21, 2005	Corfu	United States	Darien Lake Performing Arts Center	15,044 / 21,800	$579,684
July 23, 2005	Burgettstown	United States	Post-Gazette Pavilion	21,526 / 23,085	$767,857
July 24, 2005	Bristow	United States	Nissan Pavilion	18,803 / 20,975	$926,511
July 26, 2005	Holmdel	United States	PNC Bank Arts Center	24,119 / 33,888	$1,507,920
July 27, 2005	Holmdel	United States	PNC Bank Arts Center	24,119 / 33,888	$1,507,920
July 30, 2005	Tinley Park	United States	Tweeter Center	20,794 / 28,644	$936,538
July 31, 2005	Noblesville	United States	Verizon Wireless Music Center	20,038 / 24,204	$749,207
August 2, 2005	Columbus	United States	Germain Amphitheater	14,606 / 20,000	$534,228
August 4, 2005	Clarkston	United States	DTE Energy Music Theatre	17,202 / 17,202	$949,564
August 6, 2005	East Troy	United States	Alpine Valley Music Theatre	20,575 / 35,072	$869,270
August 11, 2005	Auburn	United States	White River Amphitheatre	16,923 / 19,536	$789,414
August 13, 2005	Mountain View	United States	Shoreline Amphitheatre	19,623 / 23,000	$834,402
August 14, 2005	Wheatland	United States	Sleep Train Amphitheatre	11,709 / 19,711	$462,162
August 15, 2005	Wheatland	United States	Sleep Train Amphitheatre		
August 16, 2005	West Valley City	United States	~~USANA Amphitheatre~~ (Cancelled due to low ticket sales)		
August 18, 2005	Phoenix	United States	Cricket Wireless Pavilion	16,430 / 20,151	$779,100
August 20, 2005	San Bernardino	United States	Hyundai Pavilion	46,078 / 46,843	$1,704,385
August 23, 2005	Albuquerque	United States	Journal Pavilion	10,267 / 14,171	$578,675
August 25, 2005	Dallas	United States	Smirnoff Music Center	9,056 / 19,082	$545,586
August 27, 2005	The Woodlands	United States	Cynthia Woods Mitchell Pavilion		
August 28, 2005	Selma	United States	Verizon Wireless Amphitheater		
August 31, 2005	Antioch	United States	Starwood Amphitheatre		
September 2, 2005	Charlotte	United States	Verizon Wireless Amphitheatre		
September 4, 2005	West Palm Beach	United States	Sound Advice Amphitheatre	15,045 / 19,282	$648,187

== Ozzfest 2006 ==
- Main stage:

Ozzy Osbourne (on select dates), System of a Down, Disturbed, Avenged Sevenfold (cancelled August 13), Hatebreed (cancelled August 9 and 13), Lacuna Coil, DragonForce

- Second stage:

Ozzy Osbourne (on select dates), Black Label Society, Atreyu, Unearth, Bleeding Through, Norma Jean

- Second Stage (rotating slots):

A Life Once Lost, The Red Chord, Walls of Jericho, Strapping Young Lad, All That Remains, Full Blown Chaos, Between the Buried and Me, Bad Acid Trip

Date	City	Country	Venue	Tickets sold / Available	Revenue
June 29, 2006	Auburn	United States	White River Amphitheatre		
July 1, 2006	Mountain View	United States	Shoreline Amphitheatre		
July 2, 2006	Wheatland	United States	Sleep Train Amphitheatre		
July 4, 2006	Albuquerque	United States	Journal Pavilion	13,628 / 14,996	$674,716
July 5, 2006	Greenwood Village	United States	Coors Amphitheatre		
July 7, 2006	Phoenix	United States	Cricket Wireless Pavilion	15,598 / 20,234	$710,726
July 8, 2006	San Bernardino	United States	Hyundai Pavilion		
July 9, 2006	Chula Vista	United States	Coors Amphitheatre		
July 11, 2006	Selma	United States	Verizon Wireless Amphitheater		
July 15, 2006	Maryland Heights	United States	UMB Bank Pavilion	13,484 / 21,310	$565,609
July 16, 2006	Tinley Park	United States	First Midwest Bank Amphitheatre		
July 18, 2006	Burgettstown	United States	Post-Gazette Pavilion		
July 19, 2006	Clarkston	United States	DTE Energy Music Theatre	15,902 / 17,120	$841,267
July 21, 2006	Columbus	United States	Germain Amphitheater	16,709 / 20,000	$571,229
July 22, 2006	East Troy	United States	Alpine Valley Music Theatre		
July 23, 2006	Noblesville	United States	Verizon Wireless Music Center		
July 25, 2006	Toronto	Canada	Molson Amphitheatre		
July 26, 2006	Scranton	United States	Toyota Pavilion		
July 27, 2006	Corfu	United States	Darien Lake Performing Arts Center	16,886 / 21,800	$610,195
July 29, 2006	New York City	United States	Randall's Island	14,280 / 20,250	$810,471
July 30, 2006	Hartford	United States	New England Dodge Music Center		
August 1, 2006	Mansfield	United States	Tweeter Center	19,903 / 19,903	$1,129,770
August 4, 2006	Camden	United States	Tweeter Center at the Waterfront	25,021 / 25,531	$1,228,534
August 5, 2006	Virginia Beach	United States	Verizon Wireless Amphitheater	14,561 / 20,055	$516,766
August 6, 2006	Bristow	United States	Nissan Pavilion	19,506 / 21,250	$803,857
August 9, 2006	Raleigh	United States	Alltel Pavilion		
August 13, 2006	West Palm Beach	United States	Sound Advice Amphitheatre		

== Ozzfest 2007 ==
- Main stage

Ozzy Osbourne, Lamb of God, Static-X, Lordi, Black Tide (started August 10)

- Second stage

Hatebreed, Behemoth, Nick Oliveri and the Mondo Generator (July 12–22), DevilDriver (started August 2), Egypt Central (August 2–8)

- Second stage (rotating slots)

Nile, Ankla, The Showdown, 3 Inches of Blood, DÅÅTH, In This Moment, Chthonic, Circus Diablo

Date	City	Country	Venue
July 12, 2007	Auburn	United States	White River Amphitheatre
July 14, 2007	George	United States	The Gorge Amphitheatre
July 17, 2007	Wheatland	United States	Sleep Train Amphitheatre
July 19, 2007	Mountain View	United States	Shoreline Amphitheatre
July 21, 2007	San Bernardino	United States	Hyundai Pavilion
July 24, 2007	Phoenix	United States	Cricket Wireless Pavilion
July 26, 2007	Albuquerque	United States	Journal Pavilion
July 28, 2007	Greenwood Village	United States	Fiddler's Green Amphitheatre
July 30, 2007	Bonner Springs	United States	Verizon Wireless Amphitheater Kansas City
August 2, 2007	Dallas	United States	Smirnoff Music Center
August 4, 2007	Selma	United States	Verizon Wireless Amphitheater
August 6, 2007	Maryland Heights	United States	Verizon Wireless Amphitheater
August 8, 2007	Columbus	United States	Germain Amphitheater
August 10, 2007	Tinley Park	United States	First Midwest Bank Amphitheatre
August 12, 2007	East Troy	United States	Alpine Valley Music Theatre
August 14, 2007	Noblesville	United States	Verizon Wireless Music Theatre
August 16, 2007	Holmdel	United States	PNC Bank Arts Center
August 18, 2007	Hartford	United States	New England Dodge Music Theatre
August 20, 2007	Mansfield	United States	Tweeter Center Boston
August 22, 2007	Camden	United States	Tweeter Center
August 24, 2007	Burgettstown	United States	Post-Gazette Pavilion
August 26, 2007	Clarkston	United States	DTE Energy Music Theatre
August 28, 2007	Charlotte	United States	Verizon Wireless Amphitheatre
August 30, 2007	West Palm Beach	United States	Sound Advice Amphitheatre

== Ozzfest 2008 ==
- Main stage

Metallica, Ozzy Osbourne, Serj Tankian, Hellyeah, Jonathan Davis, Cavalera Conspiracy, Shadows Fall, Apocalyptica, In This Moment, All Star Dimebag Darrell Tribute

- Second stage

Sevendust, DevilDriver, Kingdom of Sorrow, Soilent Green, Witchcraft, Goatwhore

- Texas stage

The Sword, Drowning Pool, Rigor Mortis, The Destro, Within Chaos, Debri, Black Tooth

Date	City	Country	Venue
August 9, 2008	Frisco	United States	Pizza Hut Park

== Ozzfest 2010 ==
=== United States ===
- Main stage

Ozzy Osbourne, Mötley Crüe, Halford, Devildriver, Nonpoint

- Second stage

Black Label Society (cancelled august 20, August 22 and August 24), Drowning Pool (cancelled August 24), Kingdom of Sorrow (cancelled August 14)

- Second stage (rotating slots):

Goatwhore (cancelled August 21), Skeletonwitch, Saviours, Kataklysm (cancelled August 24), Exodus (August 14 only), California Wildebeest (August 14 only), and Immune (August 14 only)

=== United Kingdom ===
- Main stage

Ozzy Osbourne, Therapy?, Murderdolls, Steel Panther, Skindred

- Second stage

Paradise Lost, Black Spiders, Revoker, Jettblack

=== Israel ===
- Main stage

Ozzy Osbourne, Korn, Soulfly and Betzefer.

- Second stage

Almana Shchora, Behind the Sun and Tal Friedman and his band the Krayot.

Date	City	Country	Venue
August 14, 2010	San Bernardino	United States	San Manuel Amphitheater
August 17, 2010	Tinley Park	United States	First Midwest Bank Amphitheatre
August 19, 2010	Burgettstown	United States	First Niagara Pavilion
August 21, 2010	Hartford	United States	Comcast Theatre
August 22, 2010	Camden	United States	Susquehanna Bank Center
August 24, 2010	Mansfield	United States	Comcast Center
September 18, 2010	London	England	O_{2} Arena
September 28, 2010	Tel Aviv	Israel	Yarkon Park

== Ozzfest Japan 2013 ==
- May 11

Slipknot, Slash featuring Myles Kennedy and the Conspirators, Fade, Deftones, Maximum the Hormone, Man with a Mission, Fear, and Loathing in Las Vegas, The Treatment, Namba 69, crossfaith, Galneryus, Momoiro Clover Z, Knock Out Monkey, and Artema

- May 12

Black Sabbath, Tool, Stone Sour, Dir En Grey, Anthem, coldrain, Steel Panther, Mucc, AA=, Ningen Isu, Head Phones President, and fade

Date	City	Country	Venue
May 11, 2013	Chiba	Japan	Makuhari Messe
May 12, 2013	Chiba	Japan	Makuhari Messe

== Ozzfest Japan 2015 ==
- November 21

Korn, Evanescence, Bullet for My Valentine, Noisemaker, VAMPS, ONE OK ROCK, Crossfaith, Corey Taylor, MEANING, Crystal Lake, and SiM

- Opening acts: Wrong City, NoisyCell, The Winking Owl, Unveil Raze
- November 22

Ozzy and Friends, Jane's Addiction, Hatebreed, A Day to Remember, Black Label Society, Babymetal, Fear, and Loathing in Las Vegas, 9mm Parabellum Bullet, Her Name in Blood, Ningen Isu, and OLDCODEX

- Opening acts: Animetal the Second, A Crowd of Rebellion, Kanojo in the Display, SALTY DOG

Date	City	Country	Venue
Nov 21, 2015	Chiba	Japan	Makuhari Messe
Nov 22, 2015	Chiba	Japan	Makuhari Messe

== Ozzfest Meets Knotfest 2016 ==
=== Ozzfest ===
- Lemmy Stage

Black Sabbath, Disturbed, Megadeth, Opeth, Black Label Society, Rival Sons

- Monster Energy Stages 1 and 2

Suicidal Tendencies, Hatebreed, DevilDriver, Goatwhore, Huntress

- Nuclear Blast stage

Municipal Waste, Kataklysm, The Shrine, Still Rebel, Allegaeon, Brujeria

=== Knotfest ===
- Lemmy Main Stage

Slipknot, Slayer, Amon Amarth, Anthrax, Trivium, Motionless in White

- Rockstar Stages 1 and 2

Sabaton, Suicide Silence, Overkill, Emmure, Butcher Babies, Man with a Mission

- Nuclear Blast Stage

Whitechapel, Combichrist, Death Angel, Carnifex, Loathe, SiM, ONI

Date	City	Country	Venue
September 24, 2016	San Bernardino	United States	San Manuel Amphitheater
September 25, 2016	San Bernardino	United States	San Manuel Amphitheater

== Ozzfest Meets Knotfest 2017 ==
=== Ozzfest ===
- Main Stage

Ozzy Osbourne, Prophets of Rage, Deftones, Children of Bodom, Orange Goblin

- Second Stage

Kreator, Baroness, High on Fire, Iron Reagan, 1349, Havok, Kyng, Tombs, Night Demon, Thrown Into Exile

- Nuclear Blast stage

Possessed, Suffocation, Fallujah, Rings of Saturn

=== Kornfest ===
- Main Stage

Rob Zombie, Marilyn Manson, Stone Sour, Eighteen Visions, Prayers

- Second Stage

Testament, Life of Agony, The Black Dahlia Murder, Upon a Burning Body, Goatwhore, Death Angel, Code Orange, Oni, Stitched Up Heart, Ded

- Nuclear Blast Stage

Sid Wilson, Repulsion, Exhumed, Warbringer, Ghoul

Date	City	Country	Venue
November 4, 2017	San Bernardino	United States	Glen Helen Amphitheater
November 5, 2017	San Bernardino	United States	Glen Helen Amphitheater

== Ozzfest 2018 ==
=== Line-up ===
Main stage

- Ozzy Osbourne
- Rob Zombie
- Marilyn Manson
- Jonathan Davis
- Body Count

2nd stage

- Zakk Sabbath
- DevilDriver
- Wednesday 13

Date	City	Country	Venue
December 31, 2018	Inglewood	United States	The Forum

== Ozzfest 2027 ==
Date	City	Country	Venue
July 10, 2027	Milton Keynes	England	Milton Keynes Bowl
September 11, 2027	San Bernardino	United States	Glen Helen Amphitheater
September 18, 2027	Mexico City	Mexico	Estadio GNP Seguros

== Guest appearances ==
- Ron Jeremy – introduced Coal Chamber before their set in 1996. Can be seen on the Ozzfest Live VHS (discontinued).
- Phil Anselmo – performed the song "Kill All The White People" with Type O Negative in 1997 at the Glen Helen Amphitheater in San Bernardino, CA.
- Henry Rollins – preceded the main stage with a spoken-word performance in 1997.
- Benji Webbe (ex-Dub War/Skindred) – appeared with Soulfly at their UK dates in 1998.
- Kerry King (Slayer) Performed Thunderkiss with Rob Zombie on June 16, 1999, at the Meadows Music Theater in Hartford Connecticut.
- Buckethead – played a few songs with Primus during their set on the Main stage in 1999, and did various stunts such as doing the "robot" and swinging around nunchaku.
- Evan Seinfeld – sang with Pantera on "Walk" in 2000 at the PNC Bank Arts Center.
- Verne Troyer – actor who played Mini Me, appeared onstage with Pantera at Pine Knob (now DTE Energy Music Theater) in Clarkston, Mi on July 12, 2000.
- Dino Cazares – joined Soulfly to perform "Eye For An Eye" at Ozzfest 2000.
- David Draiman – joined Memento to perform "Stare" at Ozzfest 2003 in Scranton, Pennsylvania.
- Corey Taylor – joined Soulfly to perform "Jumpdafuckup" at Ozzfest UK 2001, and also joined SiM to perform a cover of Radiohead's song "Creep" at Ozzfest Japan 2015.
- Tom Araya – joined Soulfly to perform "Terrorist" at Ozzfest UK 2001.
- John Dolmayan – appeared with Tool in 2002 at the Antwerp and Dublin dates, performing "Triad."
- George Oosthoek (ex-Orphanage) – appeared with Within Temptation during "The Other Half (Of Me)" at Nijmegen in 2002.
- Dave Lombardo – appeared with Slayer at Nijmegen in 2002 (filling in for Paul Bostaph who had an elbow injury) and also with Tool.
- Mike Bordin – performed with Tool at Donington and Nijmegen in 2002.
- Zakk Wylde – performed with Soil on "Halo" in 2002.
- Kelly Osbourne – performed with Andrew W.K. on "She Is Beautiful" in 2002.
- John Tardy and Frank Watkins performed a mini-set of Obituary songs at Ozzfest 2002 in West Palm Beach, Florida with Andrew W.K. and his band. Obituary drummer Donald Tardy was Andrew's touring drummer at the time.
- Dimebag Darrell and Vinnie Paul joined Disturbed onstage at Ozzfest 2003 in Alpine Valley, Wisconsin and played guitar and drums respectively for a version of "Walk"
- Rob Halford – appeared with Black Sabbath on August 26, 2004, in Camden, replacing an ill Ozzy.
- Howard Jones – appeared with Throwdown in 2004.
- Will Smith and Jada Pinkett Smith – appeared with Bury Your Dead in 2005.
- Harry Perry during the 2006 Ozzfests, would play sets with System of a Down. He was also seen playing his guitar with a portable amp around the venues during the second stage performances.
- Candace Kucsulain of Walls of Jericho appeared with In This Moment in 2007.
- John 5 appeared with Static-X in 2007.
- Randy Blythe from Lamb of God joined Hatebreed to perform "Perseverance" and "Doomsayer" at Ozzfest 2007.
- Kevin Talley filled in on drums for Devildriver
- King Diamond joined Metallica at Ozzfest 2008 and performed a medley of "Evil", "Curse of the Pharaohs", "Satan's Fall", "A Corpse Without a Soul", and "Into the Coven." This medley also appeared on Metallica's Garage Inc. cover album, as the track "Mercyful Fate."
- Chester Bennington joined Disturbed in 2001 to perform a cover of Pantera's "Walk".
- Buzz Osborne from the Melvins played guitar on a few songs with Tool during their performance in 1998.
- Yuto Miyazawa joined Ozzy Osbourne at Ozzfest 2010 for the first 6 shows to play "Crazy Train"
- Drowning Pool joined Nonpoint to play "Miracale" and "Bodies" at Ozzfest 2010 on August 24.
- Branden Schieppati of Bleeding Through appeared onstage with Avenged Sevenfold at the Chicago date of Ozzfest 2006 to perform their cover of Pantera's "Walk".
- Nikki Sixx of Mötley Crüe joined Rob Zombie & Marilyn Manson at Ozzfest 2018 for a cover of The Beatles Helter Skelter.
- Dino Cazares guitarist of Fear Factory performed a song with Slayer right after a set with Fear Factory in San Antonio, Texas at Retama Park July 11, 1999.
