= AA= discography =

Discography of Japanese music project AA=

- Studio albums: 7
- Soundtrack albums: 1
- Live albums: 6
- Compilation albums: 1
- Singles: 12
- Video albums: 9
- Other albums: 4

The discography of AA=, the solo music project formed by Japanese musician Takeshi Ueda in 2008, comprises seven numbered studio albums, a compilation album, split and conceptual albums, physical and digital singles, live recordings, video albums, and soundtrack work.

== Albums ==
=== Studio albums ===
Year	Title	Release date
2009	#1	February 25, 2009
2010	#2	June 9, 2010
2011	#3	December 14, 2011
2014	#4	September 24, 2014
2016	#5	May 18, 2016
2019	#6	August 7, 2019
2025	#7	April 23, 2025

=== Other albums ===
Year	Title	Type	Release date
2013	#	Split album	November 27, 2013
2013	4	Split album	December 11, 2013
2018	(re:Rec)	Re-recorded compilation album	April 4, 2018
2022	Story of Suite #19	Conceptual album	July 20, 2022
2023	Teenage Dreams	Cover album, credited to Takeshi Ueda	March 29, 2023

== Singles ==
=== Physical singles ===
Year	Title	Release date
2012	"The Klock"	July 11, 2012
2018	"Saw"	October 20, 2018

=== Digital singles ===
Year	Title	Release date
2008	"Peace!!!"	October 20, 2008
2013	"Warwarwar"	September 4, 2013
2013	"Humanity2"	September 18, 2013
2015	"→Mirai→ (Post Mirai)"	August 5, 2015
2015	"M Species"	November 22, 2015
2016	"Free the Monster"	March 18, 2016
2018	"Saw"	November 7, 2018
2019	"Deep Inside"	February 8, 2019
2019	"Poser"	June 7, 2019
2021	"Suite #19"	November 24, 2021
2024	"Fight & Pride"	May 23, 2024

== Live albums ==
All of the project's live albums have been released digitally.

Year	Title	Release date
2014	Live #4 at Liquidroom 20140209	April 9, 2014
2016	Live #5 at Liquidroom 20160611	October 7, 2016
2019	The OIO Day	March 6, 2019
2020	Live #6 at O-East 20191117	February 26, 2020
2021	Distort Your Home	January 13, 2021
2022	Live Story of Suite #19 at Liquidroom 20220226	July 6, 2022

== Video albums ==
Year	Title	Release date
2009	Tour #1	September 2, 2009
2013	Tour #3 Ver. 1.0+2.0	February 13, 2013
2014	Tour #4 + MV	September 24, 2014
2016	Tour #5	December 7, 2016
2019	The OIO Day	March 27, 2019
2020	Tour #6	February 26, 2020
2021	Distort Your Home	March 3, 2021
2022	Live from Story of Suite #19	July 20, 2022
2026	Tour #7	May 13, 2026

== Soundtracks ==
Year	Title	Notes	Release date
2012	Original Soundtrack with Joker Game	Soundtrack to the film Joker Game	December 19, 2012
