= Never Ending Tour 2003 =

2003 concert tour by Bob Dylan

- Tour by Bob Dylan
- Poster to the concert in Frankfurt, Germany
- Start date: February 6, 2003
- End date: November 25, 2003
- Legs: 4
- No. of shows: 11 in Oceania; 54 in North America; 33 in Europe; 98 in total

Bob Dylan concert chronology
- Never Ending Tour 2002 (2002); Never Ending Tour 2003 (2003); Never Ending Tour 2004 (2004)

The Never Ending Tour is the popular name for Bob Dylan's endless touring schedule since June 7, 1988.

== Tour ==
The 2003 tour started with eleven concerts in Oceania, seven being in Australia and four being in New Zealand. The concert in Melbourne on February 8 was part of the 'Melbourne International Music & Blues Festival'. The concert in Perth was part of the 'Moonlight, Music & Wine Festival'. This leg of the tour came to an end twenty one days after the first concert on February 26. There were originally plans to continue this tour into Japan but these plans were abandoned.

Dylan then went on to tour the Central and Western United States, starting on April 18 in Dallas. Dylan performed two shows at the New Orleans Jazz & Heritage Festival on April 25 & 26. Then on May 2 Dylan and his band performed at the '10th Annual Music Midtown Festival'. Two days later he performed at 'SunFest 2003' in West Palm Beach, Florida and then later on in the month on May 17 he performed at the '2003 Jubilee! Jam'.

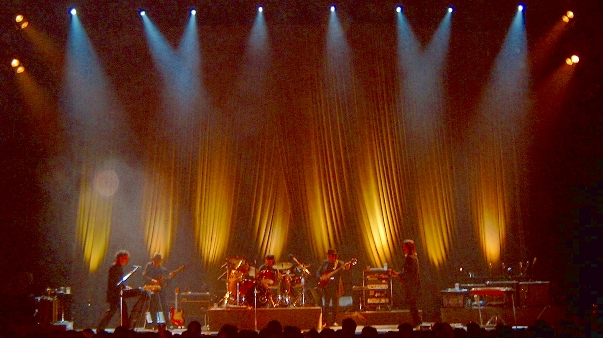
Dylan performing in Brussels, Belgium

After finishing the spring tour Dylan returned to the road in mid-July to perform another tour of the United States. The tour started on July 12 at Winter Park, Colorado with a performance at the 'Winter Park Festival 2003'. Dylan opened for The Dead in Sunrise, Florida on July 29. Dylan continued to open for The Dead until August 8. Then he performed two double bill concerts with Tom Petty and the Heartbreakers on August 9 & 10. Dylan then completed the rest of the tour with just himself and his band. Dyln

On October 9 Dylan embarked on a thirty-three date European tour covering fifteen countries and twenty-nine cities. The tour came to an end in London, England at the Brixton Academy. He had also performed in London the previous two nights at the Shepherd's Bush Empire and the Hammersmith Apollo.

== Tour dates ==
Date	City	Country	Venue	Attendance	Box Office
Oceania
February 6, 2003	Canberra	Australia	AIS Arena	—	—
February 8, 2003 (Note: The February 8, 2003 concert in Melbourne was part of the Melbourne International Music and Blues Festival.)	Melbourne	Australia	Melbourne Exhibition Centre Blue Stage	—	—
February 11, 2003	Brisbane	Australia	Brisbane Entertainment Centre	—	—
February 13, 2003	Adelaide	Australia	Adelaide Entertainment Centre	—	—
February 15, 2003 (Note: The February 15, 2003 concert in Perth was part of the Moonlight Music & Wine Festival.)	Perth	Australia	Claremont Showground	—	—
February 17, 2003	Sydney	Australia	Sydney Entertainment Centre	—	—
February 18, 2003	Newcastle	Australia	Newcastle Entertainment Centre	—	—
February 21, 2003	Auckland	New Zealand	North Shore Events Centre	—	—
February 22, 2003	Auckland	New Zealand	North Shore Events Centre	—	—
February 24, 2003	Wellington	New Zealand	Queens Wharf Events Centre Arena	—	—
February 26, 2003	Christchurch	New Zealand	WestpacTrust Centre	3,498 / 4,530	$153,824
North America
April 18, 2003	Dallas	United States	Granada Theater	—	—
April 19, 2003	Austin	United States	The Backyard	6,684 / 10,000	$247,626
April 20, 2003	Austin	United States	The Backyard	6,684 / 10,000	$247,626
April 22, 2003	Houston	United States	Verizon Wireless Theater	—	—
April 23, 2003	Houston	United States	Verizon Wireless Theater	—	—
April 25, 2003 (Note: The April 25 and 26, 2003 concerts in New Orleans were part of the New Orleans Jazz & Heritage Festival.)	New Orleans	United States	Fair Grounds Race Course	—	—
April 26, 2003	New Orleans	United States	Municipal Auditorium	—	—
April 27, 2003	Tunica	United States	Harrah's Grand Event Centre	—	—
April 29, 2003	Nashville	United States	The Trap	—	—
April 30, 2003	Louisville	United States	Jillian's Parking Lot	7,500 / 7,500	$225,000
May 2, 2003 (Note: The May 2, 2003 concert in Atlanta was part of Music Midtown.)	Atlanta	United States	Piedmont Park	—	—
May 4, 2003 (Note: The May 4, 2003 concert in West Palm Beach was part of SunFest.)	West Palm Beach	United States	West Palm Beach Waterfront	—	—
May 5, 2003	Orlando	United States	Hard Rock Live	—	—
May 6, 2003	North Charleston	United States	North Charleston Coliseum	—	—
May 8, 2003	Portsmouth	United States	nTelos Pavilion	—	—
May 9, 2003	Atlantic City	United States	Hilton Hotel Grand Theatre	—	—
May 10, 2003	Atlantic City	United States	Hilton Hotel Grand Theatre	—	—
May 11, 2003	Solomons	United States	Washington Gas Pavilion	—	—
May 13, 2003	Cary	United States	The Amphitheatre at Regency Park	—	—
May 14, 2003	Asheville	United States	Asheville Civic Center	—	—
May 16, 2003 (Note: The May 16, 2003 concert in Birmingham was part of City Stages.)	Birmingham	United States	Linn Park	—	—
May 17, 2003 (Note: The May 16, 2003 concert in Birmingham was part of Jubilee Jam.)	Jackson	United States	Capitol Street Downtown Jackson	—	—
May 17, 2003 (Note: The May 17, 2003 concert in Little Rock was originally scheduled to take place at Alltel Arena.)	Little Rock	United States	Nitelife Rocks	—	—
July 12, 2003 (Note: The July 12, 2003 concert in Winter Park was part of the Winter Park Festival.)	Winter Park	United States	Winter Park Resort	—	—
July 13, 2003	Casper	United States	Casper Events Center	—	—
July 15, 2003	Jackson	United States	Snow King Mountain Resort	—	—
July 16, 2003	Big Sky	United States	Meadow Village Pavilion	—	—
July 17, 2003	West Valley City	United States	USANA Amphitheatre	—	—
July 19, 2003	Lake Tahoe	United States	Harveys Outdoor Amphitheater	—	—
July 21, 2003	Ketchum	United States	Ketchum Park & Ride Lot	—	—
July 22, 2003	Nampa	United States	Idaho Center Amphitheater	—	—
July 23, 2003	Bend	United States	Les Schwab Amphitheater	—	—
July 25, 2003	Kelseyville	United States	Konocti Harbor Resort & Spa Amphitheatre	—	—
July 26, 2003 (Note: The July 26, 2003 concert in Winter Park was part of the California Mid-State Fair.)	Paso Robles	United States	Paso Robles Event Center Grandstand	—	—
July 27, 2003 (Note: The July 26, 2003 concert in Winter Park was part of the range County Fair.)	Costa Mesa	United States	Pacific Amphitheatre	—	—
July 29, 2003 (Note: From July 29, 2003 to August 8, 2003 Dylan and his Band were the opening act for The Dead.)	Sunrise	United States	Office Depot Center	—	—
July 30, 2003	Tampa	United States	St. Pete Times Forum	—	—
July 31, 2003	Atlanta	United States	HiFi Buys Amphitheatre	—	—
August 2, 2003	Joliet	United States	Route 66 Raceway	—	—
August 3, 2003	Somerset	United States	Float Rite Amphitheater	—	—
August 5, 2003	Noblesville	United States	Verizon Wireless Music Center	—	—
August 6, 2003	Columbus	United States	Germain Amphitheater	—	—
August 8, 2003	Darien	United States	Darien Lake Performing Arts Center	—	—
August 9, 2003 (Note: The August 9 and 10, 2003 shows in Holmdel were co-headlining concerts between Dylan and Tom Petty and the Heartbreakers.)	Holmdel	United States	PNC Bank Arts Center	26,827 / 33,888	$1,388,954
August 10, 2003	Holmdel	United States	PNC Bank Arts Center	26,827 / 33,888	$1,388,954
August 12, 2003	New York City	United States	Hammerstein Ballroom	9,009 / 10,202	$696,925 (Note: The score data is combined from the shows held at the Hammerstein Ballroom on August 12, 13 and 20, 2003.)
August 13, 2003	New York City	United States	Hammerstein Ballroom	9,009 / 10,202	$696,925
August 16, 2003	Bushkill	United States	Tom Ridge Pavilion	—	—
August 17, 2003	Wallingford	United States	Oakdale Theatre	—	—
August 19, 2003	Northampton	United States	Pines Theater	—	—
August 20, 2003 (Note: The August 20, 2003 concert in New York City was originally scheduled to take place on August 14. It was then rescheduled to August 15 before being rescheduled a third time to August 20.)	New York City	United States	Hammerstein Ballroom	—	—
August 21, 2003	Gilford	United States	Meadowbrook Music Arts Center Pavilion	—	—
August 22, 2003 (Note: The July 26, 2003 concert in Winter Park was part of the Great New York State Fair.)	Syracuse	United States	New York State Fair Grandstand	—	—
August 23, 2003	Niagara Falls	Canada	Oakes Garden Theatre	—	—
Europe
October 9, 2003	Helsinki	Finland	Hartwall Areena	—	—
October 11, 2003	Stockholm	Sweden	Globe Arena	—	—
October 12, 2003	Karlstad	Sweden	Löfbergs Lila Arena	—	—
October 13, 2003	Oslo	Norway	Oslo Spektrum	—	—
October 15, 2003	Gothenburg	Sweden	Scandinavium	—	—
October 16, 2003	Copenhagen	Denmark	Forum Copenhagen	—	—
October 17, 2003	Hamburg	Germany	Docks	—	—
October 18, 2003	Hamburg	Germany	Docks	—	—
October 20, 2003	Berlin	Germany	Berlin Arena	—	—
October 22, 2003	Leipzig	Germany	Arena Leipzig	—	—
October 23, 2003	Prague	Czech Republic	T-Mobile Arena	—	—
October 24, 2003	Budapest	Hungary	László Papp Budapest Sports Arena	—	—
October 26, 2003	Graz	Austria	Eisstadion Liebenau	—	—
October 27, 2003	Vienna	Austria	Wiener Stadthalle Halle D	—	—
October 29, 2003	Munich	Germany	Olympiahalle	—	—
October 30, 2003	Bolzano	Italy	PalaOnda	—	—
November 1, 2003	Rome	Italy	Palazzo dello Sport	—	—
November 2, 2003	Milan	Italy	FilaForum	—	—
November 3, 2003	Zürich	Switzerland	Hallenstadion	—	—
November 5, 2003	Freiburg	Germany	Stadthalle Freiburg	—	—
November 6, 2003	Frankfurt	Germany	Jahrhunderthalle	—	—
November 8, 2003	Düsseldorf	Germany	Philips Halle	—	—
November 10, 2003	Amsterdam	Netherlands	Heineken Music Hall	—	—
November 11, 2003	Amsterdam	Netherlands	Heineken Music Hall	—	—
November 12, 2003	Brussels	Belgium	Forest National	—	—
November 13, 2003	Paris	France	Zénith de Paris	—	—
November 15, 2003	London	England	Wembley Arena	—	—
November 17, 2003	Dublin	Ireland	Point Theatre	—	—
November 20, 2003	Sheffield	England	Hallam FM Arena	—	—
November 21, 2003	Birmingham	England	National Exhibition Centre Arena	—	—
November 23, 2003	London	England	Shepherd's Bush Empire	—	—
November 24, 2003	London	England	Carling Apollo Hammersmith	—	—
November 25, 2003	London	England	Brixton Academy	—	—

=== Cancelled shows ===
November 18, 2003	Millstreet, Ireland	Green Glens Arena	Cancelled.
