= Never Ending Tour 2005 =

2005 concert tour by Bob Dylan

- Tour by Bob Dylan
- Poster to the concert in Stockholm, Sweden
- Start date: March 7, 2005
- End date: November 27, 2005
- Legs: 3
- No. of shows: 82 in North America; 31 in Europe; 113 in Total

Bob Dylan concert chronology
- Never Ending Tour 2004 (2004); Never Ending Tour 2005 (2005); Never Ending Tour 2006 (2006)

The Never Ending Tour is the popular name for Bob Dylan's endless touring schedule since June 7, 1988.

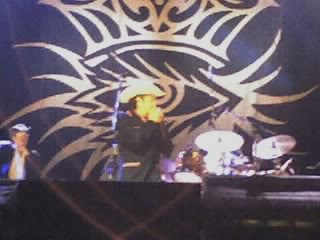
Bob Dylan in Norwich Connecticut

== Tour ==
In 2005, Dylan toured the United States with Merle Haggard. The tour included several residencies at various venues. These included three nights in Seattle, two nights in Portland, three nights in Oakland, five nights in Los Angeles, two nights in Denver, five nights in Chicago, two nights in Milwaukee, three nights in Boston and five nights in New York City.

After completing the first leg of the tour Dylan started out on a US ballpark tour with Willie Nelson starting in South Fort Myers, Florida on May 25 and ended Saint Paul, Minnesota on July 12.

Five days after the end of the previous leg Dylan performed six shows in Canada without any co-headliners and five shows in the United States.

Dylan returned to Europe after 15 months in the fall of 2005. He performed 31 shows over the space of two months covering 13 countries and 27 cities. The tour started in Stockholm, Sweden on October 17 and finished on November 27 in Dublin, Ireland.

== Tour dates ==
Date	City	Country	Venue
North America (First Leg)
March 7, 2005	Seattle	United States	Paramount Northwest Theatre
March 8, 2005	Seattle	United States	Paramount Northwest Theatre
March 9, 2005	Seattle	United States	Paramount Northwest Theatre
March 11, 2005	Portland	United States	Earle Chiles Center
March 12, 2005	Portland	United States	Earle Chiles Center
March 14, 2005	Oakland	United States	Paramount Theatre
March 15, 2005	Oakland	United States	Paramount Theatre
March 16, 2005	Oakland	United States	Paramount Theatre
March 18, 2005	Reno	United States	Reno Events Center
March 19, 2005	Paradise	United States	Theatre for the Performing Arts
March 21, 2005	Los Angeles	United States	Pantages Theatre
March 22, 2005	Los Angeles	United States	Pantages Theatre
March 23, 2005	Los Angeles	United States	Pantages Theatre
March 25, 2005	Los Angeles	United States	Pantages Theatre
March 26, 2005	Los Angeles	United States	Pantages Theatre
March 28, 2005	Denver	United States	Fillmore Auditorium
March 29, 2005	Denver	United States	Fillmore Auditorium
April 1, 2005	Chicago	United States	Auditorium Theatre
April 2, 2005	Chicago	United States	Auditorium Theatre
April 3, 2005	Chicago	United States	Auditorium Theatre
April 5, 2005	Chicago	United States	Auditorium Theatre
April 6, 2005	Chicago	United States	Auditorium Theatre
April 8, 2005	Milwaukee	United States	Eagles Ballroom
April 9, 2005	Milwaukee	United States	Eagles Ballroom
April 11, 2005	Mount Pleasant	United States	Soaring Eagle Entertainment Hall
April 12, 2005	Detroit	United States	Detroit Masonic Temple
April 13, 2005	Buffalo	United States	Shea's Performing Arts Center
April 15, 2005	Boston	United States	Orpheum Theatre
April 16, 2005	Boston	United States	Orpheum Theatre
April 17, 2005	Boston	United States	Orpheum Theatre
April 19, 2005	Newark	United States	New Jersey Performing Arts Center
April 20, 2005	Verona	United States	Verona Events Centre
April 22, 2005	Mashantucket	United States	MGM Grand at Foxwoods
April 24, 2005	Atlantic City	United States	Borgata Events Center
April 25, 2005	New York City	United States	Beacon Theatre
April 26, 2005	New York City	United States	Beacon Theatre
April 28, 2005	New York City	United States	Beacon Theatre
April 29, 2005	New York City	United States	Beacon Theatre
April 30, 2005	New York City	United States	Beacon Theatre
North America (Second Leg)
May 25, 2005	South Fort Myers	United States	Hammond Stadium
May 26, 2005	Fort Lauderdale	United States	Fort Lauderdale Stadium
May 28, 2005	Kissimmee	United States	Osceola County Stadium
May 29, 2005	Clearwater	United States	Bright House Field
May 30, 2005	Jacksonville	United States	Sam W. Wolfson Baseball Park
June 1, 2005	Chattanooga	United States	AT&T Field
June 3, 2005	Myrtle Beach	United States	Coastal Federal Field
June 4, 2005	Savannah	United States	Grayson Stadium
June 5, 2005	Birmingham	United States	Regions Park
June 7, 2005	Greenville	United States	Greenville Municipal Stadium
June 10, 2005	Salem	United States	Salem Memorial Baseball Stadium
June 11, 2005	Greensboro	United States	First Horizon Park
June 12, 2005	Zebulon	United States	Five County Stadium
June 14, 2005	Bowie	United States	Prince George's Stadium
June 15, 2005	Lakewood	United States	FirstEnergy Park
June 16, 2005	Camden	United States	Campbell's Field
June 19, 2005	Lancaster	United States	Clipper Magazine Stadium
June 21, 2005	Norwich	United States	Senator Thomas J. Dodd Memorial Stadium
June 23, 2005	Pittsfield	United States	Wahconah Park
June 24, 2005	Montclair	United States	Yogi Berra Stadium
June 26, 2005	Eastlake	United States	Classic Park
June 28, 2005	Nashville	United States	Herschel Greer Stadium
June 29, 2005	Louisville	United States	Freedom Hall
July 1, 2005	Memphis	United States	AutoZone Park
July 2, 2005	Little Rock	United States	Ray Winder Field
July 4, 2005^{[A]}	Fort Worth	United States	40 Acre North Forty Field
July 6, 2005	Tulsa	United States	Drillers Stadium
July 8, 2005	Sauget	United States	GCS Ballpark
July 9, 2005	Cedar Rapids	United States	Veterans Memorial Stadium
July 10, 2005	Schaumburg	United States	Alexian Field
July 12, 2005	Saint Paul	United States	Midway Stadium
July 16, 2005^{[B]}	Seattle	United States	Benaroya Hall
North America (Third Leg)
July 17, 2005	Victoria	Canada	Save-On-Foods Memorial Centre
July 19, 2005	Vancouver	Canada	Orpheum
July 20, 2005	Vancouver	Canada	Orpheum
July 21, 2005	Vancouver	Canada	Orpheum
July 22, 2005	Kelowna	Canada	Prospera Place
July 24, 2005	Calgary	Canada	Pengrowth Saddledome
July 26, 2005	Great Falls	United States	Four Seasons Arena
July 27, 2005	Bozeman	United States	Worthington Arena
July 28, 2005	Missoula	United States	Adams Center
July 30, 2005	Goldendale	United States	Goldendale Amphitheatre
July 31, 2005	Bend	United States	Les Schwab Amphitheater
Europe
October 17, 2005	Stockholm	Sweden	Globe Arena
October 18, 2005	Oslo	Norway	Spektrum
October 20, 2005	Karlstad	Sweden	Lofbergs Lila Arena
October 21, 2005	Gothenburg	Sweden	Scandinavium
October 22, 2005	Aalborg	Denmark	Gigantium
October 24, 2005	Hamburg	Germany	Saal 1
October 25, 2005	Berlin	Germany	Treptow Arena
October 26, 2005	Hanover	Germany	AWD Hall
October 28, 2005	Rotterdam	Netherlands	Rotterdam Ahoy
October 29, 2005	Oberhausen	Germany	König Pilsener Arena
October 30, 2005	Wetzlar	Germany	Rittal Arena Wetzlar
November 1, 2005	Brussels	Belgium	Forest National
November 3, 2005	Paris	France	Le Zénith
November 4, 2005	Amnéville	France	Arènes de Metz
November 6, 2005	Erfurt	Germany	Messehalle
November 7, 2005	Prague	Czech Republic	Sazka Arena
November 8, 2005	Munich	Germany	Zenith
November 10, 2005	Bologne	Italy	Palamalaguti
November 12, 2005	Assago	Italy	Filaforum
November 13, 2005	Zürich	Switzerland	Hallenstadion
November 15, 2005	Nottingham	England	Trent FM Arena
November 16, 2005	Manchester	England	Manchester Evening News Arena
November 17, 2005	Glasgow	Scotland	SECC
November 18, 2005	Birmingham	England	LG Arena
November 20, 2005	London	England	Brixton Academy
November 21, 2005	London	England	Brixton Academy
November 22, 2005	London	England	Brixton Academy
November 23, 2005	London	England	Brixton Academy
November 24, 2005	London	England	Brixton Academy
November 26, 2005	Dublin	Ireland	Point Theatre
November 27, 2005	Dublin	Ireland	Point Theatre

Festivals and other miscellaneous performances

^{A} This concert was a part of "Willie Nelson's Fourth of July Picnic"
^{B} This concert was a part of "Amazon.com 10th Anniversary Event"

Venue	City	Tickets Sold / Available
Wahconah Park	Pittsfield, Massachusetts	9,500 / 9,500 (100%)
