= Merry Mayhem Tour =

2001 concert tour by Ozzy Osbourne and Rob Zombie

- Co-headlining tour by Ozzy Osbourne and Rob Zombie
- Location: United States
- Associated album: Down to Earth; The Sinister Urge
- Start date: October 31, 2001
- End date: December 23, 2001
- No. of shows: 20
Ozzy Osbourne concert chronology
Ozzfest 2000 (2000)	Merry Mayhem Tour (2001)	Down to Earth Tour (2002)
Rob Zombie concert chronology
Ozzfest 1999 (1999)	Merry Mayhem Tour (2001)	The Sinister Urge Tour (2002)

The Merry Mayhem Tour was a co-headlining tour featuring Ozzy Osbourne and Rob Zombie that occurred in the fall and winter of 2001. When the tour was initially mentioned in September 2001, it was dubbed the Black Christmas Tour featuring support by Cradle of Filth. By early October, the tour was officially announced as the Merry Mayhem Tour, renamed due to the recent September 11 attacks, and would feature support from Mudvayne and Soil. The tour was set to hit 33 cities, beginning on Halloween and ending on New Year's Eve. Osbourne broke his leg while slipping when stepping out of the shower, resulting in 10 dates, scheduled between November 9 and November 24, being postponed. Later, the final three dates on the tour were cancelled, the final date due to more fallout from the September 11 attacks and the two preceding dates due to routing problems.. Therefore, the tour ended on December 23 with only 20 of the planned 33 dates occurring.

== Personnel ==
Ozzy Osbourne

- Ozzy Osbourne – lead vocals
- Zakk Wylde – guitars, backing vocals
- Robert Trujillo – bass, backing vocals
- Mike Bordin – drums

Rob Zombie

- Rob Zombie – lead vocals, backing vocals
- Mike Riggs – guitars, backing vocals
- Blasko – bass, backing vocals
- John Tempesta – drums

== Tour dates ==
Date	City	Venue	Notes
October 31, 2001	Tucson	Tucson Convention Center	
November 1, 2001	Albuquerque	Tingley Coliseum	
November 3, 2001	El Paso	Don Haskins Center	
November 5, 2001	Memphis	Memphis Pyramid	
November 7, 2001	New Orleans	New Orleans Arena	
November 9, 2001	Houston	Compaq Center	Cancelled
November 10, 2001	Bossier City	CenturyTel Center	Cancelled
November 12, 2001	Knoxville	Thompson-Boling Arena	Cancelled
November 14, 2001	Cincinnati	Firstar Center	Cancelled
November 15, 2001	Cleveland	Gund Arena	Cancelled
November 17, 2001	Nashville	Gaylord Entertainment Center	Cancelled
November 19, 2001	Birmingham	BJCC Arena	Cancelled
November 21, 2001	Miami	American Airlines Arena	Cancelled
November 23, 2001	Greensboro	Greensboro Coliseum	Cancelled
November 24, 2001	Atlanta	Philips Arena	Cancelled
November 29, 2001	Grand Forks	Alerus Center	
December 1, 2001	Madison	Alliant Energy Center	
December 2, 2001	Des Moines	Veterans Memorial Auditorium	
December 4, 2001	Moline	Mark of the Quad Cities	
December 6, 2001	Rosemont	Allstate Arena	
December 8, 2001	Detroit	Cobo Arena	
December 10, 2001	Louisville	Freedom Hall	
December 11, 2001	Grand Rapids	Van Andel Arena	
December 13, 2001	Hartford	Hartford Civic Center	
December 15, 2001	Worcester	The Centrum	
December 16, 2001	Buffalo	HSBC Arena	
December 18, 2001	Albany	Pepsi Arena	
December 20, 2001	Manchester	Verizon Wireless Arena	
December 21, 2001	Uniondale	Nassau Veterans Memorial Coliseum	
December 23, 2001	East Rutherford	Continental Airlines Arena	
December 28, 2001	Los Angeles	Los Angeles Sports Arena	Cancelled
December 29, 2001	San Diego	San Diego Sports Arena	Cancelled
December 31, 2001	Phoenix	Cricket Pavilion	Cancelled
