= Yuto Miyazawa =

Japanese rock musician (born 2000)

- Born: Yuto Miyazawa; 21 February 2000 (age 26); Tokyo, Japan
- Genres: Rock, hard rock, heavy metal
- Occupations: Musician
- Instruments: Guitar, vocals
- Years active: 2008–present
- Label: None
- Website: yutoguitar.com

Yuto Miyazawa (Japanese: 宮澤佑門 Miyazawa Yūto, born 21 February 2000) is a Japanese rock musician.

== Biography ==
Miyazawa was born on 21 February 2000, in Tokyo, and currently lives there with his parents. Miyazawa was named "The Youngest Professional Guitarist" by the Guinness World Records in August 2008.

Miyazawa has performed with numerous musicians including G. E. Smith, Les Paul, Galactic, Deep Banana Blackout and Ozzy Osbourne. He has appeared at Madison Square Garden, B. B. King's, Chris Noth and Rodeo Bar in New York City, and at the Gathering of the Vibes festival.

In May 2009, Miyazawa appeared on The Ellen DeGeneres Show, where he performed "Crazy Train" playing guitar and singing lead vocals. He named his musical idols as Ozzy Osbourne and Randy Rhoads, and showed his guitar to be an official Rhoads edition polka-dot Flying V. After the performance, Ozzy Osbourne came on stage to give words of encouragement and awarded him with a signed plaque of Osbourne and Rhoads performing at a concert. Miyazawa appeared on stage at BlizzCon 2009 with Osbourne to play "Crazy Train" as the first encore performance. In 2010, Miyazawa came back on The Ellen DeGeneres Show and played "Paranoid." He also played "Crazy Train" with Osbourne at Ozzfest 2010.

In 2012, Miyazawa joined rock band, The Robotix, with other young musicians including Logan Robot Gladden, Angelina Baez, Brendan James, Jared Devino and Jon Casel.

From 2018 to 2022c Miyazawa attended Carleton College. There, he played for several student bands, most notably The Beans of Production, known for their rendition of “Dancing in the Moonlight.”
