= Never Ending Tour 2006 =

2006 concert tour by Bob Dylan

- Tour by Bob Dylan
- Poster to the concert in Sioux Falls, USA
- Associated album: Modern Times
- Start date: April 1, 2006
- End date: November 20, 2006
- Legs: 4
- No. of shows: 79 in North America; 20 in Europe; 99 in total

Bob Dylan concert chronology
- Never Ending Tour 2005 (2005); Never Ending Tour 2006 (2006); Never Ending Tour 2007 (2007)

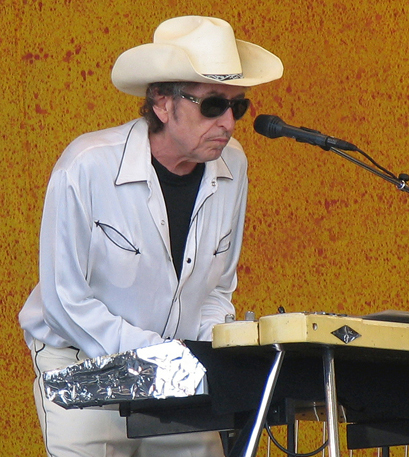
Dylan at the New Orleans Jazz and Heritage Festival

The Never Ending Tour is the popular name for Bob Dylan's endless touring schedule since June 7, 1988.

== Tour ==
The tour started off in Reno, Nevada at the Reno Events Center and the first leg came to an end on May 10, in Hollywood, Florida after 29 concerts.

The European leg of the tour started June 24 in Kilkenny, Ireland and came to an end on July 20 in Cosenza, Italy. Dylan and his band performed at several festivals during the tour including Live At The Marquee in Cork, Ireland and Roskilde Festival in Roskilde, Denmark. Dylan also performed his only concert in England of the year which was in Bournemouth at the Bournemouth International Centre.

After completing the European Tour Dylan returned to the United States to perform 21 concerts in ballparks across the States excluding one concert at the Bryce Jordan Center in University Park, Pennsylvania. Dylan also performed a private concert on Genentech Campus at University of California, San Francisco.

Dylan once again toured North America in the fall of 2006 performing 24 concerts in the United States and five concerts in Canada. This leg of the tour started on October 11 in Vancouver, British Columbia and ended in New York City on November 20.

== Tour dates ==
Date	City	Country	Venue
North America (First Leg)
April 1, 2006	Reno	United States	Reno Events Center
April 3, 2006	Stockton	United States	Stockton Arena
April 4, 2006	Santa Rosa	United States	J. T. Grace Pavilion
April 5, 2006	Bakersfield	United States	Rabobank Arena
April 7, 2006	Paradise	United States	Theatre for the Performing Arts
April 8, 2006	Sun City West	United States	Maricopa County Events Center
April 10, 2006	Tucson	United States	Tucson Convention Center
April 11, 2006	Albuquerque	United States	Tingley Coliseum
April 12, 2006	El Paso	United States	Don Haskins Center
April 14, 2006	San Antonio	United States	Municipal Auditorium
April 15, 2006	Grand Prairie	United States	Verizon Theater
April 17, 2006	Kansas City	United States	Midland Theatre
April 18, 2006	Kansas City	United States	Midland Theatre
April 20, 2006	St. Louis	United States	Fox Theatre
April 21, 2006	Des Moines	United States	Val Air Ballroom
April 22, 2006	Springfield	United States	Shrine Auditorium
April 24, 2006	Memphis	United States	Orpheum Theater
April 25, 2006	Memphis	United States	Orpheum Theater
April 28, 2006^{[A]}	New Orleans	United States	Fair Grounds Race Course
April 29, 2006	Jackson	United States	Mississippi Coliseum
April 30, 2006	Birmingham	United States	Birmingham–Jefferson Arena
May 2, 2006	Davidson	United States	John M. Belk Arena
May 4, 2006	Knoxville	United States	Tennessee Theatre
May 5, 2006	Atlanta	United States	Chastain Park Amphitheater
May 6, 2006	Asheville	United States	Asheville Civic Center
May 7, 2006	Savannah	United States	Savannah Civic Center
May 9, 2006	Orlando	United States	TD Waterhouse Centre
May 10, 2006	Tampa	United States	USF Sun Dome
May 11, 2006	Hollywood	United States	Hard Rock Live
Europe
June 24, 2006^{[B]}	Kilkenny	Ireland	Nowlan Park
June 25, 2006^{[C]}	Cork	Ireland	The Docklands
June 27, 2006	Cardiff	Wales	Cardiff International Arena
June 28, 2006	Bournemouth	England	Bournemouth International Centre
June 30, 2006^{[D]}	Roskilde	Denmark	Roskilde Dyrskueplads
July 2, 2006	Gelsenkirchen	Germany	Amphitheatre
July 3, 2006	Lille	France	Zénith de Lille
July 4, 2006	Cournon-d'Auvergne	France	Zénith d'Auvergne
July 6, 2006^{[E]}	Palafrugell	Spain	Jardins De Cap Roig
July 7, 2006	Valencia	Spain	Jardines De Viveros
July 8, 2006	Vilalba	Spain	Campo De Futbol Municipal
July 9, 2006	Valladolid	Spain	Pabellón Polideportivo Pisuerga
July 10, 2006^{[F]}	San Sebastián	Spain	Playa De La Zurriola
July 12, 2006^{[G]}	Perpignan	France	Campo Santo
July 13, 2006	Le Cannet	France	La Palestre
July 15, 2006^{[H]}	Pistoia	Italy	Piazza Duomo
July 16, 2006	Rome	Italy	Auditorium Parco della Musica
July 17, 2006	Paestum	Italy	Teatro dei Templi
July 19, 2006	Foggia	Italy	Teatro Mediterraneo
July 20, 2006	Cosenza	Italy	Stadio San Vito
North America (Second Leg)
August 12, 2006	Comstock Park	United States	Fifth Third Ballpark
August 13, 2006	Columbus	United States	Cooper Stadium
August 15, 2006	Lexington	United States	Applebee's Park
August 17, 2006	Augusta	United States	Lake Olmstead Stadium
August 18, 2006	Winston-Salem	United States	Ernie Shore Field
August 19, 2006	Frederick	United States	Harry Grove Stadium
August 20, 2006	Washington	United States	Falconi Field
August 23, 2006	Reading	United States	FirstEnergy Stadium
August 24, 2006	Pawtucket	United States	McCoy Stadium
August 26, 2006	Pittsfield	United States	Wahconah Park
August 27, 2006	Manchester	United States	Northeast Delta Dental Stadium
August 29, 2006	New Britain	United States	New Britain Stadium
August 30, 2006	Rochester	United States	Frontier Field
September 1, 2006	Fishkill	United States	Dutchess Stadium
September 2, 2006	Cooperstown	United States	Doubleday Field
September 3, 2006	University Park	United States	Bryce Jordan Center
September 5, 2006	Fort Wayne	United States	Memorial Stadium
September 7, 2006	Rochester	United States	Mayo Field
September 8, 2006	Sioux Falls	United States	Howard Wood Field
September 9, 2006	Fargo	United States	Newman Outdoor Field
September 18, 2006^{[I]}	San Francisco	United States	Genentech Campus
North America (Third Leg)
October 11, 2006	Vancouver	Canada	Pacific Coliseum
October 13, 2006	Seattle	United States	KeyArena
October 14, 2006	Portland	United States	Portland Memorial Coliseum
October 16, 2006	San Francisco	United States	San Francisco Civic Auditorium
October 17, 2006	San Francisco	United States	San Francisco Civic Auditorium
October 18, 2006	Sacramento	United States	ARCO Arena
October 20, 2006	Inglewood	United States	The Forum
October 21, 2006	Long Beach	United States	Long Beach Arena
October 22, 2006	San Diego	United States	Cox Arena
October 24, 2006	Denver	United States	Fillmore Auditorium
October 25, 2006	Lincoln	United States	Pershing Auditorium
October 27, 2006	Hoffman Estates	United States	Sears Centre
October 28, 2006	Hoffman Estates	United States	Sears Centre
October 29, 2006	Saint Paul	United States	Xcel Energy Center
October 31, 2006	Madison	United States	Kohl Center
November 2, 2006	Auburn Hills	United States	The Palace of Auburn Hills
November 3, 2006	London	Canada	John Labatt Centre
November 5, 2006	Ottawa	Canada	Scotiabank Place
November 7, 2006	Toronto	Canada	Air Canada Centre
November 8, 2006	Montreal	Canada	Bell Centre
November 9, 2006	Portland	United States	Cumberland County Civic Center
November 11, 2006	Boston	United States	Agganis Arena
November 12, 2006	Boston	United States	Agganis Arena
November 13, 2006	Uniondale	United States	Nassau Coliseum
November 15, 2006	Amherst	United States	Mullins Center
November 16, 2006	East Rutherford	United States	Continental Airlines Arena
November 17, 2006	Fairfax	United States	Patriot Center
November 18, 2006	Philadelphia	United States	Wachovia Spectrum
November 20, 2006	New York City	United States	New York City Center

Festivals and other miscellaneous performances

^{A} This concert was a part of "New Orleans Jazz & Heritage Festival".
^{C} This concert was a part of "Kilkenny Source Festival".
^{C} This concert was a part of "Live At The Marquee".
^{D} This concert was a part of "Roskilde Festival".
^{E} This concert was a part of "Cap Roig Gardens Festival".
^{F} This concert was a part of "Concierto Por La Paz".
^{G} This concert was a part of "Les Estivales de Perpignan".
^{H} This concert was a part of "Pistoia Blues Festival".
^{I} This concert was a private concert.

Cancellations and rescheduled shows

April 27, 2006	Baton Rouge, Louisiana	Unknown Club Venue	Cancelled
April 27, 2006	Lafayette, Louisiana	Unknown Club Venue	Cancelled

=== Box office score data ===
Venue	City	Tickets Sold / Available	Gross Revenue
Events Center	Reno	4,584 / 4,584 (100%)	$295,427
Maricopa Events Center	Sun City West	5,479 / 6,305 (87%)	$293,041
Convention Center	Tucson	6,020 / 7,397 (81%)	$315,768
Nowlan Park	Kilkenny	23,312 / 25,000 (93%)	$1,613,043
Continental Airlines Arena	East Rutherford	9,838 / 14,309 (69%)	$663,570
Patriot Center	Fairfax	8,000 / 8,000 (100%)	$452,000
TOTAL		57,233 / 65,595 (87%)	$3,632,849
