= Logan Robot Gladden =

American musician (born 2003)

Logan "Robot" Gladden
- Born: December 5, 2003 (age 21); Fort Worth, Texas, U.S.
- Occupations: Drummer; singer; songwriter; musician; record producer
- Instruments: Drums; Vocals; Piano; Guitar; Bass
- Years active: 2004–present

Logan Gladden (sometimes known as "Robot") (born December 5, 2003) is an American drummer, singer, songwriter, musician, and record producer. He grew up in the Dallas-Fort Worth area with his parents and sister and currently resides in Nashville, TN.

== Early life ==
Gladden was born in Fort Worth, Texas. He began playing the drums when he was only 18 months old. His nickname "Robot" stems from his earliest pronunciations of the name Logan. A self-taught drummer, he began taking lessons at the age of seven. He began his career as the drummer, vocalist, piano player, and founding member of The Robotix, an all-kids rock band with members from Texas, California, and Japan.

== Career ==
Gladden began his music career posting live-performance drum clips on YouTube. In 2009, Barney and Friends aired several episodes featuring Gladden (then age 5) as a rock and jazz drummer – the episodes remain in rotation worldwide. At age seven, he became one of the youngest artists ever endorsed by Pearl Drums. Also at age seven, Gladden was a featured artist in the Chuck E. Cheese in-store video entertainment series, which aired hourly in Chuck E. Cheese restaurants nationwide during the spring of 2011. He and several other young musicians formed a band in the Dallas area, which opened for numerous acts including Rick Springfield and Spin Doctors in May 2011.

=== 2012–present ===
In 2012, the group added 12-year-old Yuto Miyazawa from Tokyo, Japan, and became known as The Robotix. Yuto had appeared twice on The Ellen Show and had toured with Ozzy Osbourne as lead guitarist. The Robotix released a five-song EP, Rock ‘n Roll, on December 4, 2012, via iTunes. The EP includes three original tracks and two classic rock covers. Members of The Robotix were featured on The Ellen Show, Good Morning Texas, Conan O'Brien's television show, Barney & Friends, and in Chuck E. Cheese restaurants nationwide. The band qualified as quarter-finalists on America's Got Talent (Season 8), performing Black Sabbath's Paranoid at Radio City Music Hall, before disbanding in 2014.

Following The Robotix, Gladden continued playing drums with local Dallas-based acts and made guest appearances with various international recording artists such as Kiss at Chocktaw Casino in Durrant, OK, The Struts at The Stone Pony in Asbury Park, NJ, and the Gene Simmons Band at CHS Field in St. Paul, MN. In 2017, Gladden was a featured drummer at Bonzo Bash in Santa Ana, CA.

Around the age of 10, Gladden became interested in music production after discovering the recording software GarageBand on his family computer and began teaching himself guitar, bass, and other instruments. Having spent his childhood as a working drummer in various musical settings, Gladden's interest in music developed further into songwriting and musical/visual production. Gladden moved to Nashville, TN in 2022.
