= Never Ending Tour 2004 =

2004 concert tour by Bob Dylan

- Tour by Bob Dylan
- Poster to the concert in Montauban, France
- Start date: February 28, 2004
- End date: November 27, 2004
- Legs: 5
- No. of shows: 90 in North America; 21 in Europe; 111 in Total

Bob Dylan concert chronology
- Never Ending Tour 2003 (2003); Never Ending Tour 2004 (2004); Never Ending Tour 2005 (2005)

The Never Ending Tour is the popular name for Bob Dylan's endless touring schedule since June 7, 1988.

== Tour ==
The 2004 tour started with a spring tour of the United States. Dylan performed several residencies during the tour. Including

- 3 shows in St. Louis.
- 2 shows in Milwaukee
- 3 shows in Detroit
- 3 shows at the Avalon Ballroom in Boston
- 3 shows at the Tabernacle in Atlanta
- 4 shows in Chicago at four different venues
- 3 shows in Toronto at three different venues
- 3 shows in Washington, D.C. at three different venues
- 2 shows in Philadelphia at two different venues

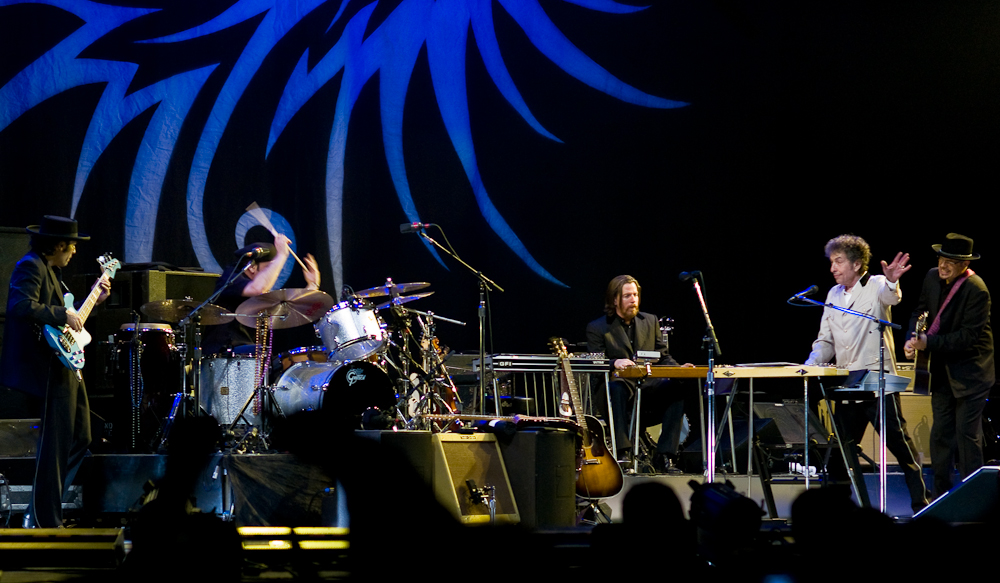
Bob Dylan at Oslo Spectrum, Norway

Dylan's European summer tour started on June 18 with a concert in Cardiff, Wales. Two days later Dylan performed in Finsbury Park, London, England as part of the Fleadh Festival. Dylan only performed two dates in England, the second in Newcastle was performed two days later. He then went on to perform two shows in Glasgow, Scotland. One at the SE&CC and the second at Barrowland Ballroom. This show was added due to the ticket demands at the previous night's concert at the SE&CC. The tour finished 31 days after it started on July 18 in Caminha, Portugal.

Dylan went on to perform a Baseball Park tour of the Eastern United States. The concerts were a double-bill with Willie Nelson. Then on October 13 Dylan commenced the final leg of the tour performing in College sports venues across the United States. The tour started on October 13 in San Francisco and ended in Allston, Massachusetts, on November 21.

== Tour dates ==
| Date | City | Country | Venue |
|---|---|---|---|
North America (first leg)
| February 28, 2004 | Tulsa | United States | Cain's Ballroom |
| March 1, 2004 | St. Louis | United States | The Pageant |
| March 2, 2004 | St. Louis | United States | The Pageant |
| March 3, 2004 | St. Louis | United States | The Pageant |
| March 5, 2004 | Chicago | United States | Aragon Ballroom |
| March 6, 2004 | Chicago | United States | Riviera Theatre |
| March 7, 2004 | Chicago | United States | The Vic Theatre |
| March 8, 2004 | Chicago | United States | Park West |
| March 10, 2004 | Saint Paul | United States | Roy Wilkins Auditorium |
| March 12, 2004 | Milwaukee | United States | Eagles Ballroom |
| March 13, 2004 | Milwaukee | United States | Eagles Ballroom |
| March 15, 2004 | Detroit | United States | State Theatre |
| March 16, 2004 | Detroit | United States | State Theatre |
| March 17, 2004 | Detroit | United States | State Theatre |
| March 19, 2004 | Toronto | Canada | Ricoh Coliseum |
| March 20, 2004 | Toronto | Canada | Phoenix Concert Theatre |
| March 21, 2004 | Toronto | Canada | The Guvernment |
| March 24, 2004 | Boston | United States | Avalon Ballroom |
| March 25, 2004 | Boston | United States | Avalon Ballroom |
| March 26, 2004 | Boston | United States | Avalon Ballroom |
| March 29, 2004 | Upper Darby Township | United States | Tower Theatre |
| March 30, 2004 | Philadelphia | United States | Electric Factory |
| March 31, 2004 | Philadelphia | United States | Trocadero Theatre |
| April 2, 2004 | Washington, D.C. | United States | 9:30 Club |
| April 3, 2004 | Washington, D.C. | United States | Bender Arena |
| April 4, 2004 | Washington, D.C. | United States | Warner Theatre |
| April 6, 2004 | Norfolk | United States | Norva Theatre |
| April 7, 2004 | Boone | United States | Holmes Center |
| April 9, 2004 | Asheville | United States | The Orange Peel |
| April 10, 2004 | Columbia | United States | Township Auditorium |
| April 12, 2004 | Atlanta | United States | The Tabernacle |
| April 13, 2004 | Atlanta | United States | The Tabernacle |
| April 14, 2004 | Atlanta | United States | The Tabernacle |
North America (second leg)
| June 4, 2004 | Gilford | United States | Meadowbrook U.S. Cellular Pavilion |
| June 5, 2004 | Uncasville | United States | Mohegan Sun Arena |
| June 6, 2004 | Atlantic City | United States | Borgata Events Center |
| June 8, 2004 | Wilmington | United States | Kahuna Summer Stage |
| June 9, 2004 | Salem | United States | Salem Civic Center |
| June 11, 2004^{[A]} | Manchester | United States | Great Stage Park |
Europe
| June 18, 2004 | Cardiff | Wales | Cardiff International Arena |
| June 20, 2004^{[B]} | London | England | Finsbury Park |
| June 22, 2004 | Newcastle | England | Metro Radio Arena |
| June 23, 2004 | Glasgow | Scotland | Scottish Exhibition & Conference Centre |
| June 24, 2004 | Glasgow | Scotland | Barrowland Ballroom |
| June 26, 2004 | Belfast | Northern Ireland | Odyssey Arena |
| June 27, 2004 | Galway | Ireland | Pearse Stadium |
| June 29, 2004 | Bonn | Germany | Museumsplatz |
| June 30, 2004^{[C]} | Worms | Germany | Platz der Partnerschaft |
| July 2, 2004 | Stra | Italy | Villa Pisani |
| July 3, 2004 | Cernobbio | Italy | Villa Ebra |
| July 5, 2004 | St. Etienne | France | Palais Des Spectacles |
| July 6, 2004^{[D]} | Montauban | France | Jardin des Plantes |
| July 7, 2004^{[E]} | Barcelona | Spain | Poble Espanyol |
| July 9, 2004 | Benidorm | Spain | Plaza De Toros |
| July 10, 2004 | Motril | Spain | Estadio Escribano Castilla |
| July 11, 2004 | Córdoba | Spain | El Fontanar Sports Hall |
| July 14, 2004 | Alcalá de Henares | Spain | Palacio Arzobispal |
| July 15, 2004 | León | Spain | León Arena |
| July 17, 2004^{[F]} | Santiago de Compostela | Spain | Auditorio Monte do Gozo |
| July 18, 2004^{[G]} | Vilar de Mouros | Portugal | Caminha |
North America (third leg)
| August 4, 2004 | Poughkeepsie | United States | The Chance |
| August 6, 2004 | Cooperstown | United States | Doubleday Field |
| August 7, 2004 | West Haven | United States | Yale Field |
| August 8, 2004 | Brockton | United States | Campanelli Stadium |
| August 10, 2004 | Fishkill | United States | Dutchess Stadium |
| August 11, 2004 | Altoona | United States | Blair County Ballpark |
| August 12, 2004 | Aberdeen | United States | Ripken Stadium |
| August 15, 2004 | Richmond | United States | The Diamond |
| August 17, 2004 | Charleston | United States | Joseph P. Riley Jr. Park |
| August 18, 2004 | Kodak | United States | Smokies Park |
| August 20, 2004 | Jackson | United States | Pringles Park |
| August 21, 2004 | Lexington | United States | Applebee's Park |
| August 22, 2004 | South Bend | United States | Stanley Coveleski Regional Stadium |
| August 24, 2004 | Comstock Park | United States | Fifth Third Ballpark |
| August 25, 2004 | Peoria | United States | O'Brien Field |
| August 27, 2004 | Madison | United States | Warner Park |
| August 28, 2004 | Des Moines | United States | Principal Park |
| August 29, 2004 | Rochester | United States | Mayo Field |
| August 31, 2004 | Lincoln | United States | Haymarket Park |
| September 1, 2004 | Wichita | United States | Lawrence–Dumont Stadium |
| September 3, 2004 | Oklahoma City | United States | RedHawks Ballpark |
| September 4, 2004 | Kansas City | United States | CommunityAmerica Ballpark |
North America (fourth leg)
| October 13, 2004 | San Francisco | United States | Regency Center Grand Ballroom |
| October 14, 2004 | Santa Clara | United States | Leavey Center |
| October 16, 2004 | Fresno | United States | Save Mart |
| October 17, 2004 | Berkeley | United States | Haas Pavilion |
| October 18, 2004 | Davis | United States | The Pavilion |
| October 20, 2004 | Irvine | United States | Bren Events Center |
| October 21, 2004 | Santa Barbara | United States | Santa Barbara Events Center |
| October 22, 2004 | San Diego | United States | Cox Arena |
| October 24, 2004 | Boulder | United States | Cools Events Centre |
| October 26, 2004 | Manhattan | United States | Bramlage Coliseum |
| October 27, 2004 | Columbia | United States | Hearnes Centre |
| October 29, 2004 | Iowa City | United States | Carver–Hawkeye Arena |
| October 30, 2004 | Kenosha | United States | Recreation Center |
| October 31, 2004 | DeKalb | United States | DeKalb Convocation Center |
| November 2, 2004 | Oshkosh | United States | |
| November 3, 2004 | West Lafayette | United States | Edward C. Elliott Hall of Music |
| November 4, 2004 | Columbus | United States | Jerome Schottenstein Center |
| November 6, 2004 | Grantham | United States | Brubaker Auditorium |
| November 7, 2004 | Pittsburgh | United States | Petersen Events Center |
| November 9, 2004 | East Lansing | United States | Breslin Student Events Center |
| November 10, 2004 | Toledo | United States | Savage Arena |
| November 11, 2004 | St. Bonaventure | United States | Reilly Center |
| November 13, 2004 | Rochester | United States | Student Centre |
| November 14, 2004 | Binghamton | United States | Binghamton University Events Center |
| November 16, 2004 | Bethlehem | United States | Stabler Arena |
| November 17, 2004 | Kingston | United States | Ryan Center |
| November 18, 2004 | Durham | United States | Whittemore Center |
| November 20, 2004 | Amherst | United States | Mullins Center |
| November 21, 2004 | Boston | United States | Lavietes Pavilion |

Festivals and other miscellaneous performances

^{A} This concert was a part of "Bonnaroo Music Festival"
^{B} This concert was a part of "Fleadh Festival"
^{C} This concert was a part of "Jazz & Joy-Festival"
^{D} This concert was a part of "Montauban Festival de Jazz"
^{E} This concert was a part of "International Arts Festival"
^{F} This concert was a part of "Xacobeo Festival 2004"
^{G} This concert was a part of "Vilar de Mouros Festival"

Cancellations and rescheduled shows

| August 14, 2004 | Salisbury, Maryland | Arthur W. Perdue Stadium | Cancelled |
| August 29, 2004 | Sioux City, Iowa | Lewis & Clark Park | Cancelled and reschedules to Mayo Field in Rochester, Minnesota |

=== Box office score data ===
| Venue | City | Tickets sold / available | Shows |
|---|---|---|---|
| Cain's Ballroom | Tulsa, Oklahoma | 1,450 / 1,450 (100%) | 1/1 |
| The Pageant | St. Louis | 6,900 / 6,900 (100%) | 3/3 |
| Aragon Ballroom | Chicago | 4,600 / 4,600 (100%) | 1/1 |
| Riviera Theatre | Chicago | 2,500 / 2,500 (100%) | 1/1 |
| Vic Theatre | Chicago | 1,400 / 1,400 (100%) | 1/1 |
| Eagles Ballroom | Milwaukee | 3,000 / 3,000 (100%) | 1/2 |
| The Phoenix | Toronto | 800 / 800 (100%) | 1/1 |
| Kool Haus | Toronto | 2,000 / 2,000 (100%) | 1/1 |
| Avalon Theatre | Boston | 6,600 / 6,600 (100%) | 3/3 |
| Tower Theatre | Upper Darby, Pennsylvania | 3,500 / 3,500 (100%) | 1/1 |
| Electric Factory | Toronto, | 2,250 / 2,250 (100%) | 1/1 |
| Trocadero Theatre | Toronto, | 1,200 / 1,200 (100%) | 1/1 |
| 9:30 Club | Washington, D.C. | 1,100 / 1,100 (100%) | 1/1 |
| Bender Arena | Washington, D.C. | 6,000 / 6,000 (100%) | 1/1 |
| Warner Theater | Washington, D.C. | 2,000 / 2,000 (100%) | 1/1 |
| The Orange Peel | Asheville, North Carolina | 942 / 942 (100%) | 1/1 |
| Great Stage Park | Manchester, Tennessee | 70,000 / 70,000 (100%) | 1/1 |
| Platz der Partnerschaft | Worms, Germany | 2,500 / 2,500 (100%) | 1/1 |
| Poble Espanyol | Barcelona, Spain | 5,000 / 5,000 (100%) | 1/1 |
| Brubaker Auditorium | Grantham, Pennsylvania | 2,200 / 2,200 (100%) | 1/1 |
| Gordon Track and Tennis Center | Allston, Massachusetts | 3,500 / 3,500 (100%) | 1/1 |
