= Pure Rubbish =

American rock band

- Origin: Houston, Texas
- Genres: Hard rock; Glam rock; Glam punk; Glam metal; Sleaze rock
- Years active: 1995–2003, 2011 (reunion gig)
- Labels: Divine Recordings, One Hit Records
- Past members: Derek Dunivan; Evan Dunivan; Willie Dunivan; Mike McWilliams; Jarrett Gardner; Allan Nelson; Morgan Thompson; Robin Geiger

Pure Rubbish was an American rock band from Houston active from late 1995 to April 2003. The band's moniker was lifted from Mick Jagger's published opinion about the 1960s rock band Herman's Hermits. Pure Rubbish had three records released between 1998 and 2001 and also recorded a debut album produced by Mike Clink (Guns N' Roses, Mötley Crüe Megadeth) titled Glamorous Youth (2001) at Rumbo Recorders that never saw an official release. The band was signed to Sharon Osbourne’s record label, Divine Recordings / Priority Records.

Pure Rubbish played on multiple US and UK tours and were included on the Ozzfest 2001 tour in addition to opening shows for AC/DC, Black Sabbath, Motörhead, Marilyn Manson, Slipknot, Linkin Park, Papa Roach, Disturbed, Drowning Pool and more.

Pure Rubbish was published in such music magazines as Rolling Stone, Spin, Billboard, Guitar World, Kerrang!, Metal Edge, Houston Press, etc. The band also appeared on MTV, VH1, and E!, including the 2002 MTV Movie Awards backing Kelly Osbourne.

== Early years (1995–2000) ==
Pure Rubbish began in 1995 when brothers Derek (guitar) and Evan (drums) Dunivan were only 11 and 9 years old. The young Dunivan brothers were self-taught musicians and learned to play their instruments by listening to records. They recruited their dad Willie Dunivan on lead vocals in late 1995. Willie Dunivan, at 34, was already a veteran musician of the local Houston music scene with his own band Personality Crisis as well as stints in short lived bands including Cheetah Chrome Project with the former Dead Boys guitarist and Michael Bruce Band with the former Alice Cooper Band guitarist. Willie Dunivan's earliest bands included the 1980s rock bands Apeshit and Hip Cat's Alley and he also played drums for the Houston 1990s punk band Stinkerbell. A charismatic frontman and great songwriter, Willie Dunivan was responsible for launching Pure Rubbish into reality. Musically, the Dunivan brothers were exposed to a wide range of influences. Their main influences were 1960s & 1970s rock, 1970s glam, and 1970s punk rock, but also absorbed the music of 1950s rock n roll, blues, r & b, and 1950s & 1960s country. These influences were culled from years of sifting through Willie's huge music collection. The band's sound was self labeled "trash rock" and "glam punk" and was a combination of all their musical influences.

The band's first show on December 9, 1995, was a Kiss tribute concert with Personality Crisis bassist Robin Geiger completing the lineup. Geiger played a few more shows with the band into 1996 lending his help until the band could find a full-time bassist. After seeing Pure Rubbish at the Westheimer Street Festival Morgan "Donor" Thompson at 14 years old was recruited to fill the bass position in summer 1996. Later that year Derek broke his arm and the band went on a temporarily hiatus.

Following the hiatus, the band made up for the lost time by gigging heavily around Texas in 1997 opening for many national acts. A friendship with the members of Nashville Pussy resulted in Pure Rubbish opening for the band the following year on a summer east coast tour. (Derek and Evan could only tour in the summer due to still being in school) While in New York City, the band met with A&R executive Tom Zutaut (who signed Guns N' Roses) which was the first time the band had any sort of major label interest. The band also released their first independent record Heavy Trash Day 7-inch EP / Tape in 1998 on Willie's own One Hit Records imprint. Morgan Thompson left the band later in 1998 and was replaced by Mike McWilliams on bass and Allan "Al G." Nelson on guitar. Both Mike and Al G. were from the recently transplanted Houston to Austin punk band Teen Cool. At this point Pure Rubbish had generated a minor buzz and did another east coast tour in June and July 1999. The band booked a recording session with producer Daniel Rey (Ramones, Misfits) in New York City while in town. The tour went well but a few months afterwards Al G. parted ways with the band. Later that year, the Daniel Rey recording session was released as the "Tejas Waste" CD EP, the band's second independent record also released on One Hit Records.

In early 2000, Pure Rubbish attended that year's South By Southwest festival and met (current Motörhead and future Pure Rubbish manager) Todd Singerman at one of the festival's shows that included both Motörhead and Nashville Pussy on the bill. March 2000 saw Jarrett "JT Trash" Gardner added to the band on guitar for the departed Al G. The meeting with Todd Singerman resulted in a June midwest tour with Pure Rubbish opening for the bands Motörhead, Nashville Pussy, and the Supersuckers. The tour was the highest profile appearance for the band at that point.

Pure Rubbish headed out on their first west coast tour in July and August. On the first date of the tour in Los Angeles, Todd Singerman brought A&R coordinator Scott Givens of Ozzy Osbourne's Divine Recordings out to see the band. On the strength of that show, Pure Rubbish was courted by Divine. The rest of the tour was a success with Lemmy from Motörhead. Around this time, Willie Dunivan passed the lead vocal duties to his son Derek who at 15 assumed the frontman role for the band.

Upon returning to Houston after the tour and on the request of Scott Givens and Lemmy, Sharon Osbourne flew down to see the band play a showcase gig in October. Willie sang for the first half of the set followed by the new lineup of Derek - lead vocals / lead guitar, Evan -drums, Mike - bass / backing vocals, and Jarrett - rhythm guitar / backing vocals making their first live appearance without Willie. This show marked the first time Derek had sung lead vocals live. The showcase gig was well received and after negotiations, Pure Rubbish officially signed to Divine Recordings in November 2000.

== Later years (2001–2003) ==
In December 2000, Pure Rubbish entered Digital Services Recording Studio in Houston to record their debut album, Glamorous Youth (produced by Mike Clink who also produced Guns N' Roses album Appetite for Destruction). They later went to Los Angeles, California to finish the album at Rumbo Recorders studio from January through March 2001. After the album was completed the band headed back to Houston briefly, only to head back to L.A. to play some promotional showcase gigs. May 2001 saw the band play Ozzfest UK at Milton Keynes, England and three shows in London supporting Motörhead and the Backyard Babies.

Pure Rubbish toured that summer from June through August on the Second Stage of Ozzfest 2001 headlined by Black Sabbath. The tour helped expose the band to new fans along with having segments aired on MTV's You Hear It First program and VH1's The Rock Show, but was also a challenge as Pure Rubbish's brand of rock n’ roll was out of step with the other bands. In the middle of the tour Pure Rubbish flew over to Paris, France to play a high-profile gig as opening bill on the AC/DC “Stiff Upper Lip Tour”. The show was a huge success and the band came back to the States reenergized to finish the rest of the Ozzfest 2001 tour. Four songs taken from the Glamorous Youth sessions were released as the S/T EP in August 2001 with different mixes of the songs. Shortly after Ozzfest that summer, the band's debut full-length album Glamorous Youth was slated for release but was stopped because the label thought the production was too dated.

In 2002, the band continued to play shows while working on new material for a planned (at that time untitled) new album to be recorded consisting of some of the songs recorded for Glamorous Youth along with the band's newly written songs. They were frustrated over the Mike Clink produced Glamorous Youth album being shelved, but were anxious to record their new songs and start touring again. Again, the release date for the new album was pushed back to summer / fall 2002. Roadrunner Records was to fund the recording of the new album and the producer chosen was Ed Stasium (Ramones, Misfits). Roadrunner thought they could give the songs and album a more modern day production job, which they felt would ensure the album better success.

In June 2002, the band (on Sharon Osbourne's behalf) journeyed to L.A. staying for a month and appeared as Kelly Osbourne's backing band on the 2002 MTV Movie Awards and the yearly Wango Tango concert. After backing Kelly, Pure Rubbish went into EMI Studios to record demos for Roadrunner Records. However, only demos of newer songs the band had been working on from mid-2001 - mid-2002 were recorded. A feature article in "Rolling Stone" magazine surfaced that July, which chronicled Pure Rubbish's tour escapades through the eyes of the youngest band to ever play on Ozzfest.

Upon returning to Houston in July 2002, the band dropped most of the old Glamorous Youth songs and even the newer demos they had recorded for Roadrunner in favor of music that was quite different from the songs the band had been playing only months before. Pure Rubbish's sound was changing drastically and the band pitched many of the self-produced demos to Roadrunner. Roadrunner wanted the band to keep their original hard rock style and conflicts arose regarding which songs to record for a full length Pure Rubbish album. Roadrunner would sign the band only if the band continued with their original sound. This disagreement led to the demise of the Roadrunner deal. Pure Rubbish continued from mid-2002 into the early months of 2003 but internal musical differences eventually split the band into two different camps concerning what they wanted to do musically. Derek and Evan wanted to create an original sound drawing from the Beatles, David Bowie, and Radiohead, while Mike and Jarrett wanted to continue playing hard rock.

Pure Rubbish officially split up in April 2003 with Derek and Evan continuing to pursue their musical aspirations in their band Penny Royal, and Mike and Jarrett forming the Urgencies in summer 2003 with Al G. and Shawn.

Derek Dunivan was featured in the book "Uncommon Sound" (2006) written by John Engel about left-handed guitar players.

== Band members ==
Pure Rubbish No. 1: (1995–1996)

- Wille Dunivan – vocals
- Derek Dunivan – lead guitar
- Evan Dunivan – drums
- Larry Cooper – guitars
- Robin Geiger – bass

Pure Rubbish No. 2: (1996–1998)

- Willie Dunivan – vocals
- Derek Dunivan – guitar
- Evan Dunivan – drums
- Morgan "Donor" Thompson – bass

Pure Rubbish No. 3: (1998–1999)

- Willie Dunivan – vocals
- Derek Dunivan – guitar
- Evan Dunivan – drums
- Mike McWilliams – bass
- Allan "Al G." Nelson – guitar

Pure Rubbish No. 4: (1999–2000)

- Willie Dunivan – vocals
- Derek Dunivan – lead guitar
- Evan Dunivan – drums
- Mike McWilliams – bass
- Jarrett "JT Trash" Gardner – rhythm guitar

Pure Rubbish No. 5: (2000–2003)

- Derek Dunivan – lead vocals, lead guitar
- Evan Dunivan – drums
- Mike McWilliams – bass, vocals
- Jarrett "JT Trash" Gardner – rhythm guitar, vocals

== Discography ==
=== EPs ===
==== Heavy Trash Day (1998) ====
- One Hit Records, OHR-002, 1,000 copies pressed
- Produced by Pure Rubbish, recorded at Studio 11 (Houston, Texas), 1998

Personnel

- Willie Dunivan – lead vocals
- Derek Dunivan – lead guitar
- Evan Dunivan – drums
- Morgan "Donor" Thompson – bass

==== Tejas Waste (1999) ====
- One Hit Records, OHR-003, 1,000 copies pressed
- Produced by Daniel Rey, recorded at Baby Monster Studios (New York City), July 1999

Personnel

- Willie Dunivan – lead vocals
- Derek Dunivan – lead guitar
- Evan Dunivan – drums
- Mike McWilliams – bass
- Allan "Al G." Nelson – guitar

==== Pure Rubbish (2001) ====
- Divine/Priority Records, DPRO-81547
- Produced by Mike Clink, mixed by John Travis
- Includes alternate mixes differing from those found on the album, Glamorous Youth

Personnel

- Derek Dunivan – lead vocals, lead guitar
- Evan Dunivan – drums
- Mike McWilliams – bass, vocals
- Jarrett "JT Trash" Gardner – rhythm guitar, vocals

=== Studio albums ===
==== Glamorous Youth (2001) ====
- Divine/Priority Records, 50166-2
- Produced by Mike Clink, mastered by Dave Collins, recorded at Digital Services Recording Studio (Houston, Texas) and Rumbo Recorders (Canoga Park, California), December 2000–March 2001

Personnel

- Derek Dunivan – lead vocals, lead guitar
- Evan Dunivan – drums
- Mike McWilliams – bass, vocals
- Jarrett "JT Trash" Gardner – rhythm guitar, vocals

=== Compilations ===
- "You're Mental" on A Fistful Of Rock 'N' Roll Volume 5 (Tee Pee Records, TP-025, 2000)
- "Kiss Of Death" (live) on Ozzfest 2001 The Second Millennium (Divine/Priority Records, EK-85950, 2001)
- "Electric Heart" on Mad Mike Jones Presents Mototrax 1 (Divine/Sanctuary Records, 84558, 2002)

== Sources ==
- Houston Press (2011).

“Pure Rubbish Reunites For Dads Farewell Show. Retrieved November 24, 2020.

- Houston Press (2002). "Glamorous Youth". Retrieved August 16, 2006.
- Rolling Stone Magazine (2002). "Munchkins In The Land Of Ozz". Retrieved August 16, 2006.
- Houston Press (1997). "Young Punks". Retrieved August 16, 2006.
- Houston Headline (2000). "Pure Rubbish" Retrieved August 16, 2006.
- Houston Headline (2000). "Pure Rubbish" Retrieved August 16, 2006.
- Little Cracked Egg (1998). "This Ain't The Partridge Family, It's Pure Rubbish" Retrieved August 16, 2006.suck
