= Somerset Amphitheater =

- Interactive map of Somerset Amphitheater
- Former names: Float-Rite Park Amphitheatre (1981–2010)
- Address: 715 Spring Street
- Location: Somerset, Wisconsin, U.S.
- Coordinates: 45°07′42.6″N 92°41′07.8″W
- Owner: Matt Mithun
- Capacity: 30,000; 10,000 (The Grove)

Construction
- Opened: 1981
- Expanded: 2011-13

Website
- Venue Website

Somerset Amphitheater is an outdoor amphitheater and campsite located in Somerset, Wisconsin along the St. Croix River. The venue consists of 200 acres of land, and hosts large outdoor concerts, as well as being a popular site for tubing and camping enthusiasts. It is the largest outdoor music venue in the Minneapolis–Saint Paul area, which comprises east-central Minnesota and portions of western Wisconsin.

A typical season runs from May through October with music performances and other events. The layout is flexible, but typically there is seating on the floor and general admission (lawn) that surrounds the stage in a bowl-like fashion. The total capacity ranges from 20,000 to 40,000, depending on the layout.

== About the venue ==
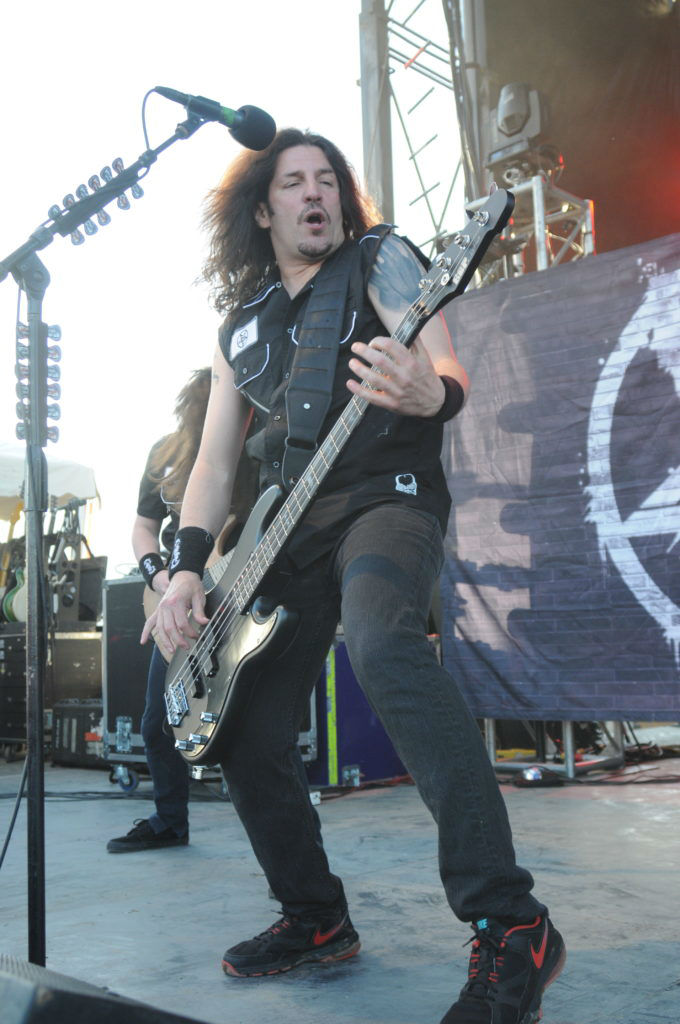
Frank Bello of Anthrax performs at Northern Invasion, May 2015

A concert site since 1981, the venue changed its name to Somerset Amphitheater in 2011 when new owner Matt Mithun (of the Mithun family) took over. Since then many upgrades and improvements have been made to the amphitheater and onsite campgrounds. The amphitheater expanded the removable reserved seating area and built an enclosed Saloon with a bar for a more intimate setting with an approximate capacity of 1,000. In 2013 the Grove stage was added in the valley between the main amphitheater and the North Campground. The Grove has a capacity of approximately 10,000. There are three campgrounds onsite; the North and South Campgrounds, which are both general camping, and the VIP Campground which has electric and water hookups for RVs and permanent bathrooms and showers.

The first concert under new ownership took place at Somerset Amphitheater in 2011 with the Soundtown Music and Camping Festival.[3] Over 30 bands performed across three stages, headlined by the Flaming Lips.

Since its reopening, the amphitheater has hosted many concerts and events, including the touring acts of My Morning Jacket, the first annual Knotfest featuring Slipknot, Summer Set Music and Camping Festival, Northern Invasion, Trampled by Turtles and The Avett Brothers. Besides musical performances, the venue hosted Tough Mudder, a British military style obstacle course and the Border Battle Beer Festival, a friendly rivalry of Minnesota and Wisconsin breweries battling each other for the most favored among taste testers.

== History ==
Before 2011, the venue had music acts varying from the Blues, Country, Bluegrass/Folk, Indie, Classic Rock, Hard Rock, Heavy Metal and Alternative genres perform on the stages. Annual concert festivals included Apple River Country Splash, Ozzfest, and 93X Fest (previously Edgefest). Other music tours featured acts of the Family Values Tour 2007, Projekt Revolution the Vans Warped Tour, Bob Dylan in '03, Soul Asylum in '93, Violent Femmes (from Milwaukee) in '94 and Garbage (from Madison) in '96 (at 93X EdgeFest). It hosted Illinois' REO Speedwagon in '93, and Disturbed and Chevelle in 2016 (at the Northern Invasion festival). The first concert held at the amphitheater was in 1981 with Charlie Daniels.

== Events ==
List of events held at the Amphitheater
Artist	Event	Date	Opening Act(s)
Apple River Country Splash		June 19, 2008	
Apple River Country Splash		June 20, 2008	
Apple River Country Splash		June 21, 2008	
Apple River Country Splash		June 18, 2009	
Apple River Country Splash		June 19, 2009	
Apple River Country Splash		June 20, 2009	
Apple River Country Splash		June 17, 2010	
Apple River Country Splash		June 18, 2010	
Apple River Country Splash		June 19, 2010	
The Avett Brothers	The Carpenter Tour	June 29, 2013	Brandi Carlile, Dr. Dog & Wheeler Brothers
The Black Crowes	2006 Tour	August 6, 2006	Drive-By Truckers & Robert Randolph and the Family Band
Bob Dylan	2003 Never Ending Tour	August 3, 2003	The Dead & Robert Hunter
Family Values Tour		July 21, 2007	
Independence ColorFest		July 4, 2014	
Independence ColorFest		July 5, 2014	
KXXR 93X	93X Festival	May 26, 2000	
KXXR 93X	93X Festival	May 25, 2001	
KXXR 93X	93X Festival	May 24, 2002	
KXXR 93X	93X Festival	May 23, 2003	
KXXR 93X	93X Festival	May 28, 2004	
KXXR 93X	93X ClamBake	July 28, 2000	
KXXR 93X	EdgeFest	July 24, 1994	
KXXR 93X	EdgeFest	May 28, 1995	
KXXR 93X	EdgeFest	May 25, 1996	
KXXR 93X	EdgeFest	May 24, 1997	
KXXR 93X	EdgeFest	May 23, 1998	
KXXR 93X	EdgeFest	May 30, 1999	
Kid Rock	Cocky Tour	May 26, 2002	
The Kinks	Phobia Tour	August 22, 1993	Kansas
KISS	Rock the Nation Tour	June 26, 2004	Poison & ZO2
Knotfest		August 18, 2012	
Lynyrd Skynyrd	Edge of Forever Tour	June 15, 2002	
Lynyrd Skynyrd	2014 Tour	September 20, 2014	Hitchville & White Iron Band
My Morning Jacket	Circuital Tour	August 10, 2012	Band of Horses & Trampled by Turtles
Northern Invasion		May 9, 2015	Slipknot, Anthrax, Five Finger Death Punch, Live & others
Ozzfest		July 18, 1998	
Ozzfest		July 1, 1999	
Ozzfest		August 12, 2000	
Ozzfest		June 16, 2001	
Ozzfest		August 17, 2002	
Ozzfest		July 19, 2003	
Ozzfest		August 7, 2005	
Ozzfest		July 14, 2006	
Pantera	Far Beyond Driven Tour	August 13, 1994	Sepultura & Prong
Projekt Revolution		August 28, 2004	
REO Speedwagon	1993 Tour	June 20, 1993	.38 Special, Blue Öyster Cult & Foghat
Soundtown Music Festival		August 19, 2011	
Summer Set Music Festival		August 24, 2012	
Summer Set Music Festival		August 25, 2012	
Summer Set Music Festival		August 26, 2012	
Summer Set Music Festival		August 9, 2013	
Summer Set Music Festival		August 10, 2013	
Summer Set Music Festival		August 11, 2013	
Summer Set Music Festival		August 15, 2014	
Summer Set Music Festival		August 16, 2014	
Summer Set Music Festival		August 17, 2014	
Summer Set Music Festival		August 14, 2015	
Summer Set Music Festival		August 15, 2015	
Summer Set Music Festival		August 16, 2015	
Summer Set Music Festival		August 11, 2016	
Summer Set Music Festival		August 12, 2016	
Summer Set Music Festival		August 13, 2016	
Warped Tour		July 18, 1998	
Warped Tour		July 16, 2001	
Warped Tour		June 28, 2003	
Widespread Panic	2014 Tour	June 21, 2014	Galactic, Jerry Joseph and The Jackmormons & Pert Near Sandstone
ZZ Top	Beer Drinkers and Hell Raisers Tour	September 13, 2003	Ted Nugent

== See also ==
- List of contemporary amphitheatres
