= AA= =

Japanese rock solo project

- Origin: Japan
- Genres: Digital hardcore; industrial rock; punk rock
- Years active: 2008–present
- Labels: Commmons; Speedstar Records
- Members: Takeshi Ueda
- Website: aaequal.com

AA= (pronounced "A-A Equal") is a Japanese rock solo project formed in 2008 by musician Takeshi Ueda, the bassist, programmer and principal songwriter of The Mad Capsule Markets. The name AA= is an abbreviation of "All Animals Are Equal", a phrase from George Orwell's novel Animal Farm. Ueda is the project's sole core member, working with a recurring group of vocalists and instrumentalists for recordings and live performances.

AA= combines electronically programmed rhythms and noise with punk, hardcore, metal and hip-hop-influenced grooves. Since its debut album #1 in 2009, the project has released seven numbered studio albums, alongside split, conceptual, live and video releases.

== History ==
=== Formation and early releases ===
Following The Mad Capsule Markets' decision to enter an indefinite hiatus in 2006, Ueda spent approximately two and a half years considering how to continue making music. He explored both conventional band arrangements and music produced entirely on a laptop before deciding to pursue a form that combined the approaches. He began recording as AA= in 2008 with vocalist Takayoshi Shirakawa of Back Drop Bomb and guitarist Minoru Kojima, a former member of The Mad Capsule Markets. Drummer Nobuaki Kaneko of Rize joined them for the project's first concert at Countdown Japan in December 2008.

The first digital single, "Peace!!!", appeared in October 2008, followed by the debut album #1 in February 2009. Tower Records described the album's sound as a mixture of electronic programming, hard guitars, punk and cyber-rock. AA= followed it with #2 in June 2010. Ueda altered his recording methods for the second album to preserve a sense of spontaneity, describing the project as one in which he handled vocals, bass, programming, guitar and production.

=== Development and AA= AiD ===
Work on the third album began before the 2011 Tōhoku earthquake and tsunami, but Ueda said the disaster substantially changed its emotional direction. The resulting #3 was released in December 2011 and was the first AA= album on which he performed all lead vocals.

In April 2011 Ueda also established the relief project AA= AiD. Its recording "We're not alone", featuring guest musicians from the Japanese rock scene, was distributed as a free download to raise funds and awareness for disaster recovery. The campaign concluded in 2021 after raising ¥7,543,286, according to the project's official account.

AA= released the two-part works # and 4 in late 2013, followed by #5 in 2016. The 2018 collection (re:Rec) presented newly recorded versions of earlier material. Ueda described the recording configuration as deliberately flexible: although AA= centers on his songwriting and production, he invites participating musicians to interpret parts freely while retaining final responsibility for the work.

=== Later work ===
The sixth numbered album, #6, was released in August 2019. In an interview marking approximately ten years of AA=, Ueda said that changes in the project's participants did not alter its central identity. Critic Dai Onojima characterized #6 as emphasizing speed, intensity and destructive force while extending the distinctive production style Ueda had developed since The Mad Capsule Markets.

The conceptual work Story of Suite #19 grew from music presented during the 2020 streamed performance Distort Your Home. It was first issued in a limited form in 2021 and received a wider release in 2022. In 2023 Ueda released the cover album Teenage Dreams under his own name, interpreting punk and new-wave songs that influenced him.

AA='s seventh numbered album, #7, was released in April 2025. The album included collaborations with Shige of Wrench and rapper Jubee and drew renewed inspiration from the alternative and heavy music of the late 1990s and early 2000s.

== Musical style and themes ==
AA='s music is built around distorted bass and guitar, electronic programming and abrupt shifts in texture and tempo. Ueda has incorporated elements of punk, hardcore, industrial music, hip hop and the alternative-heavy sound of the late 1990s. He has described AA= compositions as changing direction naturally within individual songs rather than following a single fixed arrangement.

The lyrics frequently address war, political anxiety, social inequality and collective action. Ueda has presented music both as a means of communicating those concerns and as a form of personal and communal release. The phrase "All Are United", used during the #7 period, reflected both these themes and the project's practice of combining musicians and styles around Ueda's central direction.

== Live and recording personnel ==
Ueda performs vocals, bass, guitar, synthesizer and programming and remains AA='s only permanent member. The project's original performance lineup included vocalist Takayoshi Shirakawa, guitarist Minoru Kojima and drummer Nobuaki Kaneko. Other recurring participants have included drummers Zax and Youth-K and manipulator and synthesizer player Kei Kusama. By the #7 touring period, Shirakawa, Kojima and Youth-K continued to appear in the live lineup.

== Discography ==
=== Numbered studio albums ===
- #1 (2009)
- #2 (2010)
- #3 (2011)
- #4 (2014)
- #5 (2016)
- #6 (2019)
- #7 (2025)
