= Germain Amphitheater =

Concert venue in Columbus, Ohio, US

- Interactive map of Germain Amphitheater
- Former names: Polaris Amphitheater (1994-2003)
- Address: 2200 Polaris Parkway; Columbus, Ohio
- Coordinates: 40°08′57″N 82°57′30″W
- Owner: Live Nation (2005-07)
- Capacity: 20,000

Construction
- Opened: June 15, 1994
- Closed: October 5, 2007
- Demolished: 2012
- Cost: In September 1993, plans were announced to build on 80 acres in southern Delaware County, Ohio, according to the local newspaper, The Columbus Dispatch. It was reported that the land was purchased for $50,000 an acre in the future venue's plan to build.

Germain Amphitheater (originally Polaris Amphitheater) was a 20,000-seat outdoor entertainment venue located in Columbus, Ohio, near the suburb of Westerville. The venue opened as part of a large development venture off of Interstate Highway I-71. There were 6,700 seats in an open-air pavilion—much of it under cover—and room for another 13,300 people on general admission lawn seating. The concert season began mid-May, continuing through early October and featured 20-30 concerts per year. At the time it opened, it was the largest and most suitable venue for concerts in central Ohio.

== About ==
The amphitheater opened on June 15, 1994, with a concert by The Moody Blues and the Columbus Symphony Orchestra. Since that time, it hosted some of the largest names in music, including: Rush, Aerosmith, Metallica, Janet Jackson, Phish, Dave Matthews Band, Spice Girls, Farm Aid, and Ozzfest. Toby Keith played the final show on September 16, 2007.

The venue was originally owned by Polaris Amphitheater Concerts, Inc.; a joint partnership between PromoWest Productions, Belkin Productions and Sunshine Promotions. In 1997, ownership was purchased by SFX Entertainment. In 2000, the building was owned by Clear Channel Entertainment, when the company bought out SFX Entertainment. In 2005, Clear Channel was spun off into Live Nation, who owned the building from 2005 until its closing. In February 2003, the Germain Automotive Group purchased a five-year sponsorship, renaming the venue Germain Amphitheater.

On June 17, 1997, at Ozzfest, concert goers began throwing bottles at the stage, others smashed box office windows, started brush fires, kicked over a trash can, and overturned cars outside the amphitheater, after the announcement was made that Ozzy Osbourne would not perform.

On September 7, 2003, the amphitheater was the site of the 16th annual Farm Aid concert. Tickets to the event sold out within two weeks.

== Closing ==
After the 2007 season, the amphitheater closed. According to The Columbus Dispatch, the rising real estate values were the main reason behind the sale. They also speculated that competition from other similarly-sized venues in the area, such as Nationwide Arena, Value City Arena, Columbus Crew Stadium, and Lifestyle Communities Pavilion, along with noise complaints from residents of the nearby communities of Westerville and Genoa Township may have contributed to the decline in the number of shows hosted by Germain Amphitheater in the years leading up to its closure. In 2007, only nine shows were scheduled, the fewest shows at the venue since it opened. Following the 2007 concert season, the facility and property were auctioned for sale, but received no bids from buyers.

After its closure, seats were uprooted, and the venue was extensively looted and vandalized. The site was purchased by Polaris 91 LLC in January 2012 for $5.5 million. The structure was completely demolished by May of that same year. Subsequent considerations for the site included an office complex, retail shopping center or multi-family residential space.

== Redevelopment ==
On June 15, 2014, the twentieth anniversary of the amphitheater's first concert, the Columbus Dispatch reported that site developer NP Limited was seeking state and local funding to build a road connecting the I-71/Gemini Place interchange to Worthington Road, passing through the former amphitheater site, in order to support future commercial and residential development of the 90-acre (360,000 m^{2}) site and alleviate existing traffic congestion on Polaris Parkway.

On January 27, 2015, IKEA announced plans for a store on the western edge of the former amphitheater's parking lot, along I-71. The site plan for the new store also incorporated the previously proposed plan to extend Gemini Place east to Worthington Rd. through the amphitheater complex. IKEA opened in 2017, along the newly extended Gemini Place (named “Ikea Way” between I-71 and Worthington Road). A Topgolf was constructed on the remainder of the property, opening in 2018.

== See also ==
- List of contemporary amphitheatres
