= New religion (disambiguation) =

A new religion is a religious or spiritual group that has modern origins and is peripheral to its society's dominant religious culture.

New religion may also refer to:

- New Religion (film), a 2022 Japanese horror film
- New Religion (album), a 2007 album by Primal Fear
- "New Religion" (Anton Ewald song), 2021
- "New Religion" (Bebe Rexha and Faithless song), 2026
- "New Religion" (Olamide song), 2023
- "New Religion", a song by All Time Low from the 2023 album Tell Me I'm Alive
- "New Religion", a song by Black Veil Brides from the 2011 album Set the World on Fire
- "New Religion", a song by Dhani Harrison from the 2023 album Innerstanding
- "New Religion", a song by Duran Duran from the 1982 album Rio
- "New Religion", a song by Ministry from the 2024 album Hopiumforthemasses
