= Heading for the Light =

- 1988 European single cover

Single by the Traveling Wilburys

from the album Traveling Wilburys Vol. 1
- Released: May 1989
- Recorded: May–June 1988
- Genre: Rock, rhythm and blues
- Length: 3:37
- Label: Wilbury
- Songwriter: Traveling Wilburys
- Producers: Otis Wilbury, Nelson Wilbury

The Traveling Wilburys singles chronology
| "End of the LIne" (1988) | "Heading for the Light" (1989) | "Nobody's Child" (1990) |

"Heading for the Light" is a song by the British–American supergroup the Traveling Wilburys from their 1988 album Traveling Wilburys Vol. 1. It was written primarily by George Harrison but credited to all five members of the band. Harrison sings the song with Jeff Lynne, who also co-produced the track and, with Harrison, formulated the idea for starting the Wilburys. The song was issued as a promotional single in the United States, where it peaked at number 7 on Billboard's Album Rock Tracks chart. The song received a commercial release in Australia in May 1989, where it peaked at number 88 on the ARIA singles chart.

The lyrics convey the singer's return to a sure path after a period of confusion and doubt. In the interpretation of some Harrison biographers, "Heading for the Light" reflects his rediscovery of his spiritual purpose and reconnection with his deity. An upbeat rock track, the recording features saxophone solos played by Jim Horn and recalls the sound of Harrison's 1987 album Cloud Nine, which Lynne also co-produced. Among reviews of the song, it has been seen as a reflection of Harrison's confidence during his successful return to music-making in the late 1980s, as a solo artist and then as the de facto leader of the Traveling Wilburys.

== Background ==
George Harrison and Jeff Lynne first discussed the idea for the Traveling Wilburys in early 1987 when they were recording Cloud Nine, Harrison's first album in five years. When Harrison suggested they should form their "dream" band, Lynne chose Roy Orbison as a potential bandmate, while Harrison's first choice was Bob Dylan. Lynne later said that, although he thought Harrison was "just joking", "Anything could happen with George, everybody loved him." The pair devised the term "wilbury" in response to mishaps occurring during the recording process that led to them having to "bury" the unwanted sound in the mix. (Note: By the time they were preparing an extended version of the album's lead single, "Got My Mind Set on You", in Los Angeles, Harrison had ordered custom-made Traveling Wilburys plectrums.) In April 1988, after Warner Bros. Records had asked Harrison for an additional track for the European release of "This Is Love", the third single from Cloud Nine, he and Lynne, together with Dylan, Orbison and Tom Petty, rush-recorded "Handle with Care". The song was deemed by Warner's to be too good for such a limited release. Mo Ostin, the company's chairman, instead encouraged Harrison to form the group he had long spoken of and record an album.

The band allocated ten days for writing and initial recording of the remaining songs for Traveling Wilburys Vol. 1, due to the restrictions imposed by Dylan preparing to relaunch his live act and by Orbison's touring schedule. The songs were written with all the members as creative equals, and often working from an initial idea by one member. (Note: Orbison described the collaborative process as one in which "there was no ego involved ... everyone would be throwing something in here and something in there.") Lynne recalled that the writing and initial recording of each song was completed in a single day. Harrison wrote "Heading for the Light" – a song that celebrates his return from dark times – with Lynne as his main collaborator. Petty recalled that Harrison was highly confident after the success of Cloud Nine and that, for himself, the Wilburys, and particularly his new friendship with Harrison and Lynne, provided a healing environment after arsonists had burned down his and his family's home in 1987. (Note: Impressed by Cloud Nine, Petty began working on his debut solo album, Full Moon Fever, with Lynne producing, in late 1987.) According to Harrison, although he had hoped to form a band with all the participants, "The [Wilburys] thing happened just by magic, just by circumstances. Maybe there was a full moon that night ... and it was quite a magic little thing, really."

== Composition ==
According to author Ian Inglis, despite the Wilburys' songs being credited to all five members, "Heading for the Light", like the group's singles "Handle with Care" and "End of the Line", has "Harrison's distinctive musical and vocal signature". Author Simon Leng similarly views it as an "obvious Harrisong" in its musical and lyrical themes. The composition is in the key of B major. The time signature throughout is 4/4, played with a fast shuffle beat. Leng describes the song as an "upbeat rocker" and likens its musical form to that of "All Those Years Ago", Harrison's 1981 tribute to John Lennon. According to Inglis, its ascending melody represents a "more mature" version of Harrison's 1966 composition "I Want to Tell You". The verses use a chord pattern comprising B, C♯, E minor and F♯. In the nine-bar bridge that appears twice in the song, the chords G♯ minor, F♯, E and B are used, with the section returning to the verse via C♯7.

The lyrics convey the singer's relief at returning to a path of enlightenment after a period of doubt and confusion. Theologian Dale Allison says that the song serves as a resolution to "Fish on the Sand", a Cloud Nine track in which Harrison admits to religious doubt. In "Heading for the Light", he sings of having been "blue and lonely", "lost in the night" and "close to the edge", while journeying aimlessly and unable to see his deity. In Allison's interpretation, the narrative effect of these and other lyrical images "is as though he were in a confessional, and as though we are his confessor". According to Leng, Harrison's references to his past are ruminations on "his travails as a star, the ennui of fame and fortune ... and the ups and downs of his career". By contrast, his present is portrayed as unbridled by past misfortune; he sings that "All my dreams are coming true" and that, focused on "the sun ahead", "There's nothing in the way to stop me heading for the light".

== Recording ==
The Traveling Wilburys recorded the basic track for "Heading for the Light" between 7 and 16 May 1988 at a makeshift studio in David A. Stewart's house in Los Angeles. Taped in the kitchen, the basic tracks for all the songs on the album typically featured the five band members on acoustic rhythm guitars, accompanied by an Oberheim DMX drum machine. Jim Keltner, who adopted the pseudonym "Buster Sidebury" in keeping with the five bandmates' Wilbury personas, then overdubbed drums on the recordings.

As the group's producers, Harrison and Lynne completed the album during the second round of sessions, held at Harrison's Friar Park studio in Henley in England. In the 2007 documentary on the making of Vol. 1, included in the Traveling Wilburys Collection box set, "Heading for the Light" plays over footage of Harrison and Lynne leaving Los Angeles, and Lynne recalling that they discussed ideas for developing the basic tracks "into records" during the flight. (Note: Lynne also says: "We were so into it. George was so into the Wilburys and so was I – I loved every minute of it ... To me, that's the most fun part ... Taking these rough [performances], loads of guitars all banging away, and making a nice piece out of it.") In Petty's description, this was when the songs "came alive" as they were developed with musical arrangements. The Friar Park sessions featured contributions from saxophonist Jim Horn, percussionist Ray Cooper, and Keltner, all three of whom had been part of the core group of musicians on Cloud Nine. In Leng's description, the song's arrangement includes Harrison's "riffing" lead guitar parts, "ethereal" backing singing by Orbison, and Horn's "rock 'n' roll sax" playing.

The recording includes a false ending, after which the song returns with further soloing from Horn. Authors Chip Madinger and Mark Easter describe the completed track as "effervescent" and a song that would have "fit comfortably" on Cloud Nine. While echoing the latter point, author Elliot Huntley terms "Heading for the Light" "another hook-filled R 'n' B blitzkrieg, absolutely soaked to the skin with Jim Horn's saxophone playing".

== Critical reception ==
As he had cautioned himself years before on "The Lord Loves the One," transformation can only come from within. That is why on "Heading for the Light" he sings of the world remaining the same as he gets back on the road to enlightenment. The message was constant; it was only the medium that had changed.

— Author Simon Leng

In a contemporary review for Rolling Stone, David Wild said that Traveling Wilburys Vol. 1 was "further proof of Harrison's complete return to form" and added: "Throughout, Harrison not only sounds great, he also sounds happy, thrilled to be playing once again with a witty, wonderful band." The same magazine included the album in its list of the 100 best albums of the 1980s, where its editors wrote: "'Heading for the Light,' 'Not Alone Any More' and 'Handle With Care' offer idealistic, romantic messages from a fraternity of rock graybeards. 'Well, it's alright, riding around in the breeze/Well, it's alright, if you live the life you please,' says the opening lyric to 'End of the Line.' It is a comforting notion indeed, as the uptight, conformist Eighties draw to a close."

Reviewing the 2007 box set in Exclaim! magazine, Vish Khanna said that, aside from Lynne's tendency towards "shiny production", "the original records hold up astoundingly" with Harrison "in fine form" on "Heading for the Light". Terry Lawson of the Detroit Free Press wrote that the Wilburys box set "contains some of the best work any of these hale and hearty fellows ever laid down, from the Orbison vocal showcase ['Not Alone Any More'], to Harrison's religiously uplifting 'Heading for the Light,' to Dylan's gorgeous break-up ballad 'Congratulations'". In his review for Noise to Signal, Phil Reed similarly recognised the track as "one of the best songs" of Harrison's career.

Ian Inglis describes "Heading for the Light" as Harrison's "most joyous account to date of the spiritual journey that had saved him from despair", and pairs it with "Handle with Care" as songs that are "suffused with an unadorned enjoyment that is perfectly distilled in Harrison's bright supple vocal". He also highlights the song's "soaring melody" and "ebullient production", saying that these elements create "an exhilarating track that celebrates [Harrison's] current life instead of regretting his past". Simon Leng views it as Harrison's "most uplifting account of his spiritual search". He says that it would have made "a worthy Cloud Nine track" and "is quite explicit in its meaning, but so spirited that most listeners wouldn't have cared".

== Track listing ==
Australian 7" single, cassette single

A "Heading for the Light" – 3:37
B "Rattled" – 3:00

== Personnel ==
Traveling Wilburys

- George Harrison – lead, harmony (bridge) and backing vocals; electric and acoustic guitars
- Jeff Lynne – lead (bridge) and backing vocals; acoustic guitar, bass guitar, keyboards
- Roy Orbison – backing vocals, acoustic guitar
- Tom Petty – acoustic guitar, backing vocals
- Bob Dylan – acoustic guitar, backing vocals

Additional musicians

- Jim Horn – saxophones
- Jim Keltner – drums
- Ray Cooper – percussion

== Charts ==
| Chart (1989) | Peak position |
|---|---|
| Australia (ARIA) | 88 |

== Sources ==
- Allison, Dale C. Jr. (2006). The Love There That's Sleeping: The Art and Spirituality of George Harrison. New York, NY: Continuum. ISBN 978-0-8264-1917-0.
- Amburn, Ellis (1990). Dark Star: The Roy Orbison Story. New York, NY: Carol Publishing Group. ISBN 0-8184-0518-X.
- Badman, Keith (2001). The Beatles Diary Volume 2: After the Break-Up 1970–2001. London: Omnibus Press. ISBN 978-0-7119-8307-6.
- Clayson, Alan (2003). George Harrison. London: Sanctuary. ISBN 1-86074-489-3.
- The Editors of Rolling Stone (2002). Harrison. New York, NY: Rolling Stone Press. ISBN 978-0-7432-3581-5.
- Heylin, Clinton (2011). Bob Dylan: Behind the Shades (20th Anniversary ed.). London: Faber and Faber. ISBN 978-0-571-27240-2.
- Huntley, Elliot J. (2006). Mystical One: George Harrison – After the Break-up of the Beatles. Toronto, ON: Guernica Editions. ISBN 1-55071-197-0.
- Ingham, Chris (2006). The Rough Guide to the Beatles. London: Rough Guides/Penguin. ISBN 978-1-84836-525-4.
- Inglis, Ian (2010). The Words and Music of George Harrison. Santa Barbara, CA: Praeger. ISBN 978-0-313-37532-3.
- Larkin, Colin, ed. (2011). The Encyclopedia of Popular Music (5th edn). London: Omnibus Press. ISBN 978-0-85712-595-8.
- Leng, Simon (2006). While My Guitar Gently Weeps: The Music of George Harrison. Milwaukee, WI: Hal Leonard. ISBN 978-1-4234-0609-9.
- Madinger, Chip; Easter, Mark (2000). Eight Arms to Hold You: The Solo Beatles Compendium. Chesterfield, MO: 44.1 Productions. ISBN 0-615-11724-4.
- Rodriguez, Robert (2010). Fab Four FAQ 2.0: The Beatles' Solo Years, 1970–1980. Milwaukee, WI: Backbeat Books. ISBN 978-1-4165-9093-4.
- Romanowski, Patricia; George-Warren, Holly, eds. (1995). The New Rolling Stone Encyclopedia of Rock & Roll. New York, NY: Fireside/Rolling Stone Press. ISBN 0-684-81044-1.
- Smax, Willy (dir.) (2007). The True History of the Traveling Wilburys (DVD). Traveling Wilburys; Willy Smax and Olivia Harrison (producers). Wilbury Record Co.
- Sounes, Howard (2001). Down the Highway: The Life of Bob Dylan. London: Doubleday. ISBN 0-385-60125-5.
- Tillery, Gary (2011). Working Class Mystic: A Spiritual Biography of George Harrison. Wheaton, IL: Quest Books. ISBN 978-0-8356-0900-5.
- Van der Kiste, John (2015). Jeff Lynne: The Electric Light Orchestra, Before and After. Stroud, UK: Fonthill Media. ISBN 978-1-78155-492-0.
- Zanes, Warren, ed. (2007). Tom Petty and the Heartbreakers: Runnin' Down a Dream. San Francisco, CA: Chronicle Books. ISBN 978-0-8118-6201-1.
- Zollo, Paul (2005). Conversations with Tom Petty. New York, NY: Omnibus Press. ISBN 1-84449-815-8.
