= Beautiful Creatures =

Beautiful Creatures may refer to:

- Beautiful Creatures (2000 film), a 2000 British film
- Beautiful Creatures (novel), a book by Kami Garcia and Margaret Stohl
  - Beautiful Creatures (2013 film), the film adaptation of the 2009 book by Kami Garcia and Margaret Stohl
    - Beautiful Creatures (soundtrack), the soundtrack album of the film
- Beautiful Creatures (band), an American hard rock band
  - Beautiful Creatures (album), debut album of the band

== See also ==
- Beautiful Creature, an album by Juliana Hatfield
