= Innerstanding =

Innerstanding may refer to:

- Innerstanding (Maverick Sabre album), 2015
- Innerstanding (Dhani Harrison album), 2023
