= Yomp (disambiguation) =

Yomp may refer to:

- Yomp, a Royal Marine term for a long-distance march with full kit
- "Yomp", a song by thenewno2 from You Are Here
- Yomp, a 1983 videogame by Virgin Games, Inc.
