= In Parallel (album) =

Studio album by Dhani Harrison
- Released: 6 October 2017
- Genre: Alternative rock; electronic rock; industrial
- Length: 59:01
- Label: BMG Rights Management
- Producer: Dhani Harrison

Dhani Harrison chronology
In Parallel (2017)	Innerstanding (2023)

Singles from In///Parallel
- 1. "All About Waiting" Released: 20 July 2017; 2. "Admiral of Upside Down" Released: 7 September 2017; 3. "Summertime Police" Released: 21 September 2017

In Parallel (stylized as IN///PARALLEL) is the debut solo studio album by English musician Dhani Harrison. It was released by BMG Rights Management on 6 October 2017.

Prior to the album's release, the tracks "All About Waiting", "Admiral of Upside Down" and "Summertime Police" were released as part of its promotion.

== Critical reception ==
Professional ratings
Aggregate scores
Source	Rating
Metacritic	74/100
Review scores
Source	Rating
AllMusic	3.5/5 stars

In///Parallel received generally positive reviews from critics upon release. On Metacritic it received a weighted score of 74/100 based on 7 reviews indicating "generally favorable reviews". Stephen Erlewine from AllMusic gave the album a 3.5/5 stars saying "Harrison exudes a quiet confidence, letting IN///PARALLEL unfold surely and steadily, keeping the music meditative and slightly trippy. By some criteria, the circular melodies could be classified as psychedelic, but Harrison's concerns are in the present, not the past. He layers IN///PARALLEL with all manner of electronics, relying on drum loops and synthesizers to create his darkly alluring pop".

== Track listing ==
In Parallel track listing
No.	Title	Length
1.	"Never Know"	5:23
2.	"#WarOnFalse"	3:57
3.	"Úlfur Resurrection"	7:24
4.	"Downtown Tigers"	6:21
5.	"London Water" (featuring Mereki)	7:52
6.	"Summertime Police"	4:31
7.	"Poseidon (Keep Me Safe)" (featuring Mereki)	6:18
8.	"The Light Under the Door"	6:44
9.	"All About Waiting" (featuring Camila Grey)	5:03
10.	"Admiral of Upside Down"	5:28
Total length:		59:01
