= End of the Line (Traveling Wilburys song) =

Single by Traveling Wilburys

from the album Traveling Wilburys Vol. 1
- B-side: "Congratulations"
- Released: 23 January 1989
- Genre: Folk rock, country rock
- Length: 3:30
- Label: Wilbury
- Songwriters: Bob Dylan; George Harrison; Jeff Lynne; Roy Orbison; Tom Petty
- Producers: Otis Wilbury; Nelson Wilbury

Traveling Wilburys singles chronology
"Handle with Care" (1988)	"End of the Line" (1989)	"Heading for the Light" (1990)

Music video
- "End of the Line" on YouTube

"End of the Line" is a song by the British-American supergroup the Traveling Wilburys. It was the final track on their debut album Traveling Wilburys Vol. 1, released in October 1988. It was also issued in January 1989 as the band's second single. The recording features all the Wilburys except Bob Dylan as lead singers; George Harrison, Jeff Lynne and Roy Orbison sing the choruses in turn, while Tom Petty sings the verses. The song was mainly written by Harrison and was assigned to his publishing company, Umlaut Corporation. However, all five members of the group received a songwriting credit in keeping with the collaborative concept behind the Wilburys project.

In the United States, the single peaked at No. 63 on the Billboard Hot 100 chart and at No. 2 on the Album Rock Tracks chart, blocked from the top spot by both "Driven Out" by The Fixx and "Working on It" by Chris Rea. In the United Kingdom, the single peaked at No. 52 on the UK Singles Chart.

== Music video ==
The music video for "End of the Line" was directed by Willy Smax and filmed in Los Angeles in December 1988. Set in a moving passenger carriage pulled by a steam locomotive, it features Dylan, Harrison, and Lynne playing guitar, Petty playing bass, and session musician Jim Keltner (credited as Buster Sidebury on the albums) playing drums with brushes. As Orbison had died after recording his vocals but before the video was shot, his guitar is shown sitting in a rocking chair inside the carriage, and a framed black and white photo of Orbison is shown when his vocals are first heard.

In 2025, the music video was restored in 4K from a new scan of the original 35 mm film footage.

== Legacy ==
Professional ratings
Review scores
Source	Rating
Number One	4/5 stars

The song was played in the final episode of the British sitcom One Foot in the Grave, "Things Aren't Simple Any More", and the final episode of Parks and Recreation, "One Last Ride".

A cover version sung by Dennis Waterman was used as the theme for two episodes of the BBC series New Tricks, then replaced by a close pastiche.

The song was used on the end credits of the 2016 Australian family comedy film Red Dog: True Blue and for an episode of HBO's Crashing in 2018.

The song is used in the 2024 film Sonic the Hedgehog 3 during a flashback scene depicting the friendship between Maria Robotnik and Shadow the Hedgehog. The use of the song is considered an anachronism because the scene is set in 1974, 14 years before the song's release.

== Track listing ==
7" single, cassette single

A "End of the Line" (LP version) – 3:30
B "Congratulations" (LP version) – 3:30

12" single, 3" CD single

A "End of the Line" (extended version) – 5:34
B "Congratulations" (LP version) – 3:29

== Personnel ==
- George Harrison – lead vocals (1st, 4th, and 7th choruses), acoustic guitar, slide guitar, backing vocals
- Tom Petty – lead vocals (verses), acoustic guitar, backing vocals
- Jeff Lynne – lead vocals (2nd, 5th, and 6th choruses), electric guitar, bass and backing vocals
- Roy Orbison – lead vocals (3rd chorus), acoustic guitar and backing vocals
- Bob Dylan – acoustic guitar and backing vocals
- Jim Keltner – drums

Additional musician

- Ray Cooper – tambourine

== Charts ==
=== Weekly charts ===
Chart (1989)	Peak position
Australia (ARIA)	12
Belgium (Ultratop 50 Flanders)	39
Canada Top Singles (RPM)	8
Ireland (IRMA)	14
Italy Airplay (Music & Media)	4
Netherlands (Single Top 100)	50
New Zealand (Recorded Music NZ)	11
UK Singles (Official Charts)	52
US Billboard Hot 100	63
US Adult Contemporary (Billboard)	28
US Album Rock Tracks (Billboard)	2

=== Year-end charts ===
Chart (1989)	Position
Australia (ARIA)	69
Canada Top Singles (RPM)	65

== Certifications ==
Region	Certification	Certified units/sales
United Kingdom (BPI)	Gold	400,000^{‡}
^{‡} Sales+streaming figures based on certification alone.
