= Thenewno2 =

English alternative rock band

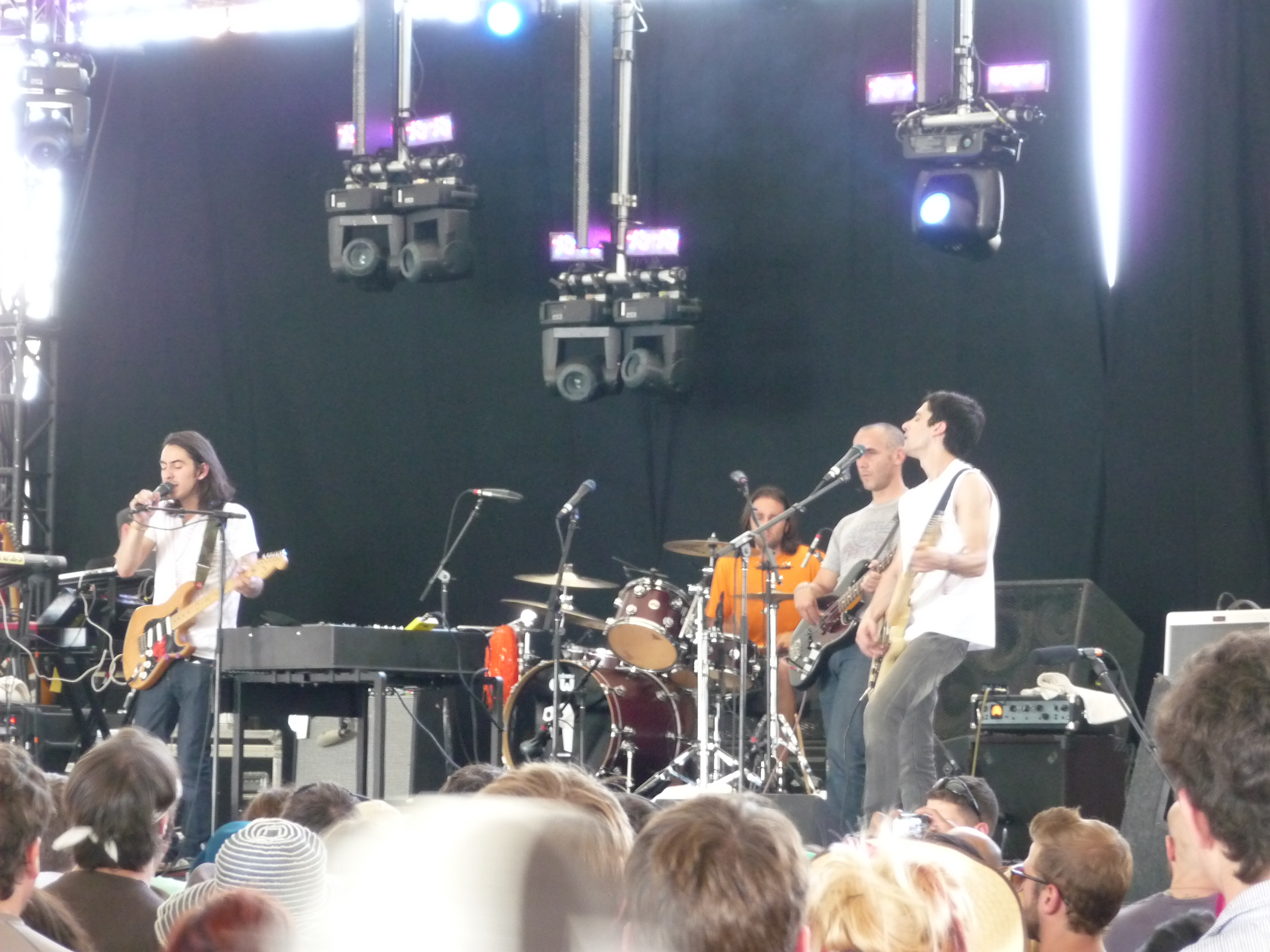
- Thenewno2 at the Coachella Festival

Background information
- Origin: London, England
- Genres: Alternative rock; electronic rock; indie rock; psychedelic rock; art rock; neo-psychedelia
- Years active: 2006–present (inactive since 2014)
- Label: Hot Records
- Members: Dhani Harrison; Paul Hicks; Jonathan Sadoff; Jeremy Faccone; Frank Zummo; Aaron Older
- Past members: Nick Fyffe; Oliver Hecks

Thenewno2 (styled as thenewno2) is an English alternative rock band from London. Originally composed of Dhani Harrison and Oliver Hecks, with Harrison playing lead guitar and singing lead vocals, and Hecks playing drums and synthesizer. As of 2014, the band consisted of Harrison, Jonathan Sadoff, Jeremy Faccone, Paul Hicks, Aaron Older and Frank Zummo. The name "Thenewno2" is a reference to the 1960s British television show The Prisoner. Thenewno2 have been credited with the album design for George Harrison's Brainwashed and Dark Horse Years box set, and for Concert for George, and the menu design for the 2005 Concert for Bangladesh DVD. Hecks was the still photographer for the Concert for George in 2002, and some of his photographs appear in Genesis Publications' limited-edition book from the same event.

Thenewno2 released their debut album, You Are Here, in February 2009. Late Night with Conan O'Brien chose Thenewno2 to be one of the show's final musical guests, a spot that also marked the band's TV debut in the US. Later that spring, Thenewno2 played Coachella, where Spin magazine dubbed their performance one of the "best debut performances of the festival". After concluding a US tour, the band took a break and Harrison focused on his side project, Fistful of Mercy featuring Harrison, Ben Harper and Joseph Arthur. Their debut was released in October 2010 and was named "One of the Best Side Projects of 2010" by NPR.

On 31 July 2012, Thenewno2 released their second album, thefearofmissingout. Rolling Stone listed the band as one of the ten "Must-See Acts" at the 2012 Lollapalooza festival. Thenewno2 scored the music to the 2013 film Beautiful Creatures.

== History ==
=== Formation ===
Thenewno2 formed in London, England in 2006, but Harrison and Hicks had been collaborating since as far back as 2001. Harrison and Hicks chose the name Thenewno2 (pronounced "the new number two"), because they wanted a "faceless entity" that they could use to make music, which would give them a chance to legitimatize without the help of Dhani Harrison's last name and its association with his father, George Harrison. They took the name "Thenewno2" from the British cult classic television series The Prisoner, liking the idea of an anonymous person. As Dhani explains, "I wanted it to be a faceless entity, because I didn’t want to be 'Dhani Harrison and the Uncles', or whatever. There was just too much flak around the name 'Harrison' at the time. I started the band so I could send anyone to a meeting, and when they were asked who they were, they could simply say 'The New No. 2.'"

== In the media ==
The song "Yomp" was released as a downloadable track for the music video game Rock Band on 29 July 2008, and the song "Crazy Tuesday" was released as one of 20 free songs for Rock Band 2. In 2009, Dhani Harrison and Thenewno2 were featured in an issue of Guitar World magazine, discussing their concert experiences and debut album, You Are Here.

On 16 February 2009, Thenewno2 performed the song "Yomp" from the album You Are Here on the American television show Late Night with Conan O'Brien in New York City. On 13 April 2009 they played at the Casbah in San Diego, California. The band played a 30-minute set at the Lollapalooza Festival in Chicago, Illinois on 8 August 2009.

In 2009, Thenewno2 began their first US tour, joined by The Heartless Bastards, and headlined by Wolfmother. The tour began in Dallas, Texas on 29 October running through to Los Angeles, California, on 24 November.

The band agreed to do the soundtrack to the film Beautiful Creatures, and recorded it at Abbey Road Studios.

== Discography ==
=== Albums ===
- You Are Here (2008)
- thefearofmissingout (2012)
- Beautiful Creatures (2013)

=== EPs ===
- EP001 (2006)
- EP002 (2011)

=== Singles ===
- "Another John Doe" (2008)
- "Choose What You're Watching" (2008)
- "One Way Out" (2011)
- "Live a Lie" (2011)

=== Music videos ===
- "Choose What You're Watching" (2008, directed by Oliver Hecks)
- "Another John Doe" (2008, directed by Oliver Hecks)
- "Yomp" (2009, directed by Adria Petty and John Gutierrez)
- "Make It Home" (2012, directed by Liam Lynch)
