= Beautiful Creatures (soundtrack) =

2026 film soundtrack album

Beautiful Creatures (Original Motion Picture Soundtrack)

Film score by thenewno2
- Released: February 12, 2013
- Recorded: Abbey Road Studios, London
- Genres: Film score; pop; rock; alternative rock; swamp rock; swamp blues; blues; electronic; orchestral
- Length: 70:35
- Label: WaterTower Music
- Producer: Mary Ramos

Thenewno2 chronology
The Fear of Missing Out (2012)	Beautiful Creatures (Original Motion Picture Soundtrack) (2013)

Beautiful Creatures (Original Motion Picture Soundtrack) is the film score and soundtrack album to the 2013 film Beautiful Creatures directed by Richard LaGravenese. The soundtrack accompanied original music composed by thenewno2, their first ever contribution for a feature film. The album also accompanied three songs, which was released through WaterTower Music on February 12, 2013.

== Background ==
The original score for Beautiful Creatures was composed by the English alternative rock band thenewno2, which consisted of Jonathan Sadoff, Dhani Harrison and Paul Hicks. The band did a show for NPR which was broadcast on radio and internet, and was witnessed by the film's music supervisor Mary Ramos, who was a friend of Sadoff's. Ramos provided their musical contributions to the editor Carl Kaller, who was searching for bands to contribute the film's music, and had liked their work as they wanted a band who could also write melodies. Though Sadoff had previous film scoring experiences, Harrison and Hicks neither were into film score, however, Hicks had remastered several of the Beatles' albums and owing to the band's production history, LaGravenese realized that they had a whole team of producers, mixers and composers over a band which Harrison attributed to it. Harrison also acknowledged being close with film composer Michael Kamen, which led to him having some kind of scoring experience.

During the initial discussions with LaGravense, Kaller and Ramos, Harrison wanted the score to be a modern-day version of Bernard Herrmann's score but with swampy blues, beats and electronica, which Harrison described it as "swamp-tronica". The three composers divided their duties on scoring the film, with Harrison arranging the bands and wrote several themes solely or with Sadoff, while Hicks handled the programming and electronic atmosphere, and Sadoff taking charge of the orchestra. Besides, Herrmann's influence, Sadoff also went with a traditional Hollywood-esque score, which resembled some of Max Steiner's work. Harrison wrote the initial melodies which Sadoff orchestrated and Hicks programmed and mixed, thereby making a collaborative effort, with each of them shifting their duties, such as Harrison arranging Sadoff's orchestral love theme into rock and alternative rock arrangements, influencing Nirvana and Pixies.

Over 80 minutes of music had been written for the film, with only 65 minutes of their music being compiled into the soundtrack. The team had earlier tuned around 75–80% of the score before being re-edited and that had led them to write even more music for the film. The score was further recorded at the Abbey Road Studios in the Studio 2 lot. A 54–80 piece orchestra was recorded with some wearing a full rock outfit and an electronic ensemble during the course of the music production and recording. Ben Harper served as one of the featured artists who performed theremin on the song "Run to Me". The lead actress, Alice Englert too performed "Needle and Thread" that featured in the end credits.

== Reception ==
Scott Hudson of RAMZine rated 5/10 and wrote "Beautiful Creatures actually doesn't have that much experimenting in terms of different instruments which is a bit of a disappointment considering thenewno2's developing and challenging sound. The instrumentals are good on the whole, there aren't that many that you could relegate to background noise, and the tracks that really stand by themselves are wonderfully emotive." Samaa Hussain of Get Ready to Rock said "Overall, Dhani and his crew have done a brilliant job of creating pieces of music that that can tell both a quietly emotional yet excitingly tense story, and I'd truly be surprised if Beautiful Creatures is anything less than a supernatural epic."

Simon Moore of Live4ever wrote "This music wants to be dangerous, but it also wants to be palatable. And that's just not how a good score works. A good score complements the film; it winds itself around every scene, owns every unforgettable moment, so that you can't even imagine one without the other. It should take risks. It should sound like nothing else out there. You should be coming away humming it; those motifs should be imprinted on your brain." Chris Bumbray of JoBlo.com wrote "there's an ok soundtrack by a presumably fashionable indie band, preciously named Thenewno2 (that's right- no spaces), which, a talkbacker below pointed out, is fronted by Dhanni Harrison, son of late-Beatle George. To me the music was fairly wallpaper-ish, but there were a couple of decent songs."

== Track listing ==
CD version
No.	Title	Featuring artist(s)	Length
1.	"Interception"		1:43
2.	"The Caster Theme"		2:56
3.	"Breaking The Ice"		4:00
4.	"Macon's Magic Wand"		1:25
5.	"Dark Magic"		1:47
6.	"Lena's Magic / The Love Theme"		3:07
7.	"Swamptronica/Voudon"		2:02
8.	"Make It Home" (Ridley's Siren Remix of previously released music)		2:26
9.	"Sarafine At Church"		3:46
10.	"Holidays At Ravenwood"		1:11
11.	"Family Dinner"		2:39
12.	"Ridley's Claiming"		2:27
13.	"The Spell That Left A Curse"		2:58
14.	"Ridley Goes To The Pictures"		0:47
15.	"Other Ways Someone Can Die To Us"		0:57
16.	"Sarafine At The Door / Love Breaks The Spell"		2:41
17.	"The Caster Library"		2:50
18.	"Searching For The Curse"		1:02
19.	"The Burning Sign"		1:28
20.	"The Curse Reveals Itself" (Tragic Love Theme)		4:09
21.	"Sacrifice"		2:23
22.	"Ridley's Swamptronica"		0:51
23.	"The Honey Hill Stomp"		2:19
24.	"Lena Runs To Ethan"		1:36
25.	"Lena's Love Rage / Macon's Addagio"		2:46
26.	"Mother and Daughter"		3:15
27.	"Run To Me"	Ben Harper; Leila Moss	3:49
28.	"Never Too Late"	Moss; Thorunn Antonia	4:08
Total length:			67:28

MP3 and iTunes version
No.	Title	Featuring artist	Length
29.	"Needle and Thread"	Alice Englert	3:07
Total length:			70:35

== Chart performance ==
Chart (2013)	Peak position
US Billboard 200	169
US Top Soundtracks (Billboard)	14
