= Dhani Harrison =

English and American musician (born 1978)

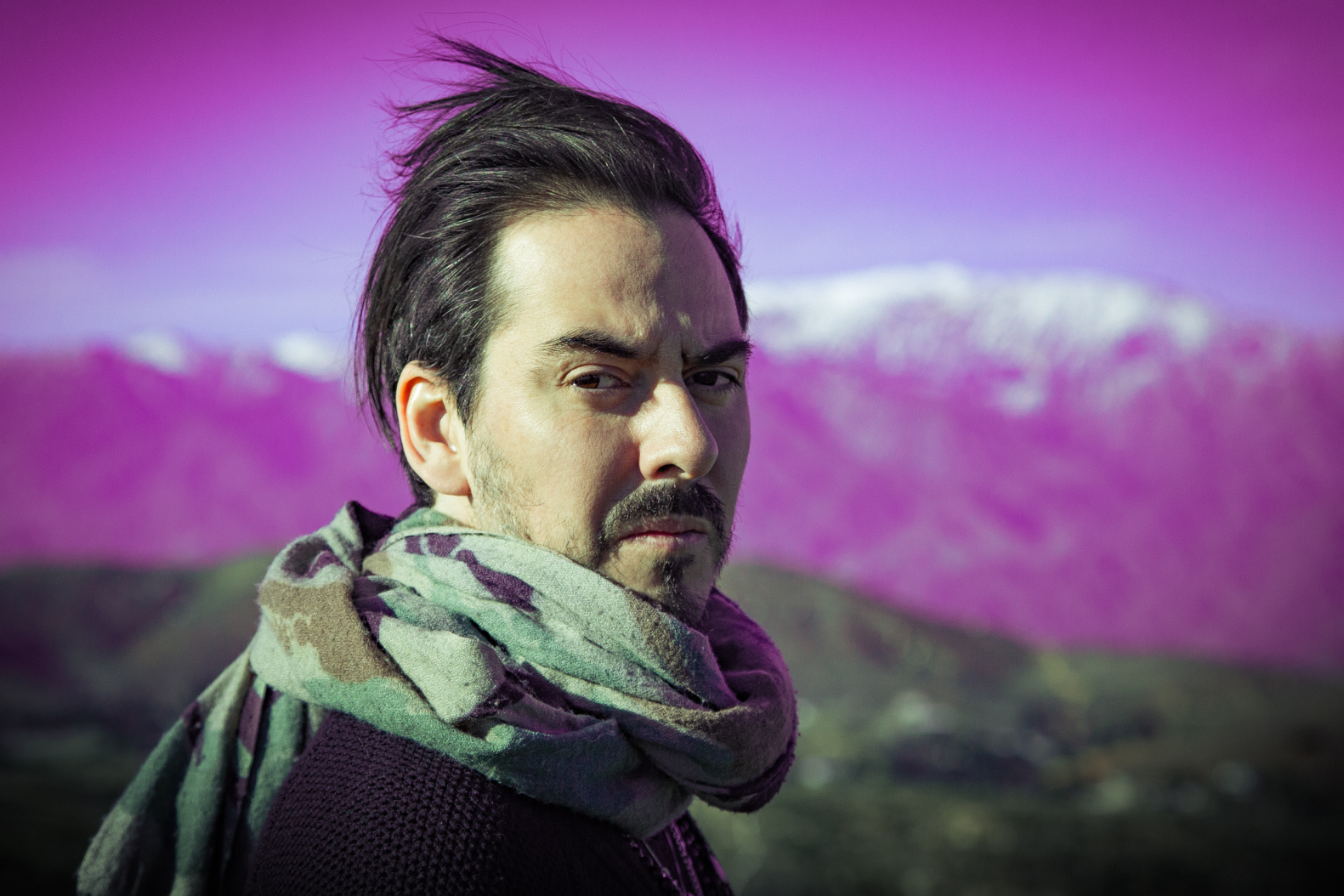
- Harrison in a photo for his album, In Parallel

Background information
- Also known as: Ayrton Wilbury
- Born: 1 August 1978 (age 48); Windsor, Berkshire, England
- Origin: London, England
- Genres: Rock; alternative rock
- Occupations: Singer-songwriter; composer; record producer
- Instruments: Guitar; vocals
- Years active: 2001–present
- Labels: Dark Horse; EMI; HOT Records
- Member of: thenewno2; Fistful of Mercy
- Spouse: Sólveig Káradóttir (m. 2012; sep. 2016)

Dhani Harrison (/ˈdæni/ DAN-ee; born 1 August 1978) is an English and American musician, composer and singer-songwriter. He is the son of George Harrison, lead guitarist of the Beatles, and Olivia Harrison. Dhani debuted as a professional musician when he helped record his father's final album, Brainwashed, which he completed with the assistance of Jeff Lynne after his father's death in November 2001.

Harrison formed his own band, thenewno2, in 2006. In 2017, Harrison released his debut solo album In Parallel. The 2019 film In///Paralive showcases the live version of the album. Harrison's 2019 single, "Motorways (Erase It)", was described by Rolling Stone as "a psychedelic track with a robust beat". Harrison's music collaborations span a diverse range of genres that have seen him tour with Eric Clapton, appear on the Wu-Tang Clan track "The Heart Gently Weeps", and join Pearl Jam live on stage several times over the years. One of Harrison's notable collaborations was in 2004 at the Rock and Roll Hall of Fame, where he appeared alongside Tom Petty, Jeff Lynne, and Prince on "While My Guitar Gently Weeps"; the song was performed to mark the posthumous induction of his father.

In 2013, Harrison launched his career as a composer. Alongside his writing partner Paul Hicks, Harrison scored the Warner Bros. movie Beautiful Creatures. In 2018, Harrison and Hicks received a nomination for Best Music Score at the International Documentary Association Awards for their work on the Sundance Film Festival award-winning documentary Matangi/Maya/M.I.A.

== Early life ==
Harrison was born on 1 August 1978 at HRH Princess Christian's Hospital in Windsor, Berkshire. Harrison is named after the sixth and seventh notes of the Indian music scale, dha and ni. Dhani is also a raga in North Indian classical music.

He grew up with his parents in Henley-on-Thames, in Friar Park, the estate on which his father had lived since 1970. His mother, Olivia Harrison, is an American of Mexican descent. One of Harrison's earliest memories, from the age of six, is receiving a drumming lesson from his father's friend and bandmate "Uncle" Ringo Starr. He recalled that before the lesson, he had been an avid drummer. However, when Starr began to play, the loud noise frightened him so much that he ran out of the room screaming.

Harrison attended Dolphin School near Twyford, a Montessori method school, followed by Badgemore Primary School, Henley-on-Thames. He later attended Shiplake College, also near Henley, where he enrolled in the Combined Cadet Force, and showed a keen interest in rowing, which continued into his later years.

Harrison is an alumnus of Brown University, Rhode Island, where he studied industrial design and physics, earning a bachelor's degree. Harrison pursued a career as a car designer at McLaren Automotive before deciding to follow in his father's footsteps as a professional musician.

== Musical career ==
Harrison assisted his father in home recording sessions, which eventually became part of the Brainwashed album project. In this process, he gained experience in performing and production techniques.

After his father's death in 2001, Harrison, in collaboration with Jeff Lynne, completed his father's final album, Brainwashed, which was released in 2002 and went on to win a Grammy for Best Pop Instrumental Performance, in "Marwa Blues", at the 46th Annual Grammy Awards in 2004. Harrison participated in the Concert for George on the first anniversary of his father's death. The concert was organized by Eric Clapton and featured some of his father's friends and collaborators, including former Beatles bandmates Paul McCartney and Ringo Starr as well as Clapton, Billy Preston, Ravi Shankar, Jeff Lynne, Tom Petty, Jim Keltner, and Joe Brown. Harrison played backup acoustic guitar for most of the concert. Before the finale, Paul McCartney relayed to the audience, "Olivia said that with Dhani up on stage, it looks like George stayed young and we all got old", referencing the physical similarities between father and son.

In 2004, Harrison appeared onstage with Tom Petty, Steve Winwood, Jeff Lynne, Prince, and others for a performance of "While My Guitar Gently Weeps" during his father's induction into the Rock and Roll Hall of Fame.

In March 2006, Harrison made a guest appearance on Liam Lynch's Podcast Video Variety Show Lynchland. They performed a duet that will appear on a Lynch album. He collaborated with Jakob Dylan on the John Lennon song "Gimme Some Truth" for the Lennon tribute album Instant Karma: The Amnesty International Campaign to Save Darfur, which was released on 12 June 2007.

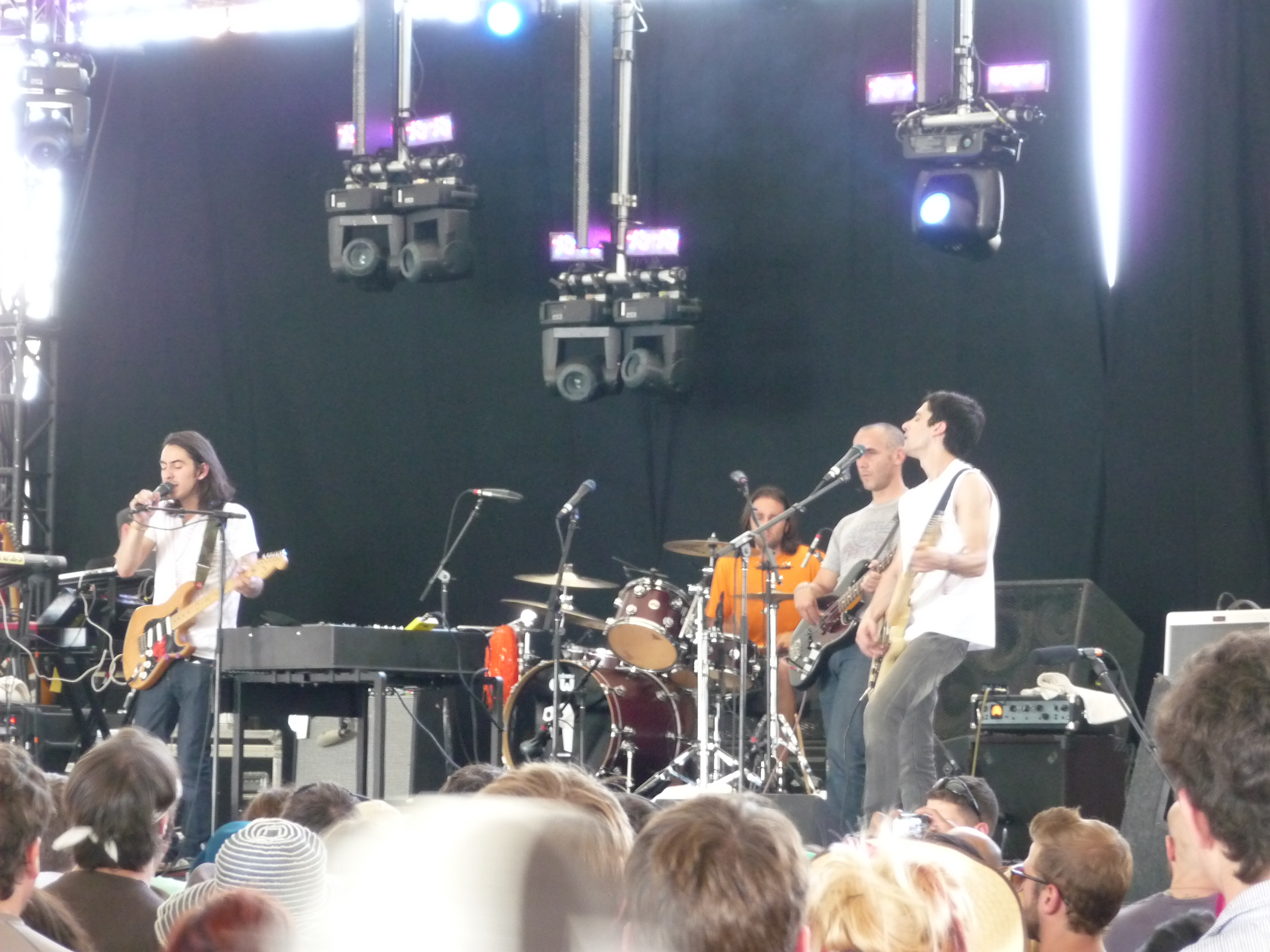
Harrison at the 2009 Coachella Festival.

In April 2006, it was announced that Harrison's band, thenewno2, had begun recording. The band released a music video, "Choose What You're Watching", on its website. thenewno2 features Harrison on lead guitar, synthesiser and vocals and Oli Hecks on drums and synths. He was involved in a re-working of the Beatles' "While My Guitar Gently Weeps" titled "The Heart Gently Weeps", which was the first single on Wu-Tang Clan's album 8 Diagrams, which eas released in December 2007.

Thenewno2's debut album, You Are Here, was released online on 11 August 2008 and in stores on 31 March 2009. The song "Yomp" was featured as a downloadable song for the Rock Band series, and "Crazy Tuesday" was featured as one of the 20 free songs that were downloadable with the purchase of Rock Band 2.

In August 2010, Dhani Harrison, Ben Harper, and Joseph Arthur joined to form Fistful of Mercy.

In 2013, Harrison was the face of Gap's fall global campaign titled "Back to Blue."

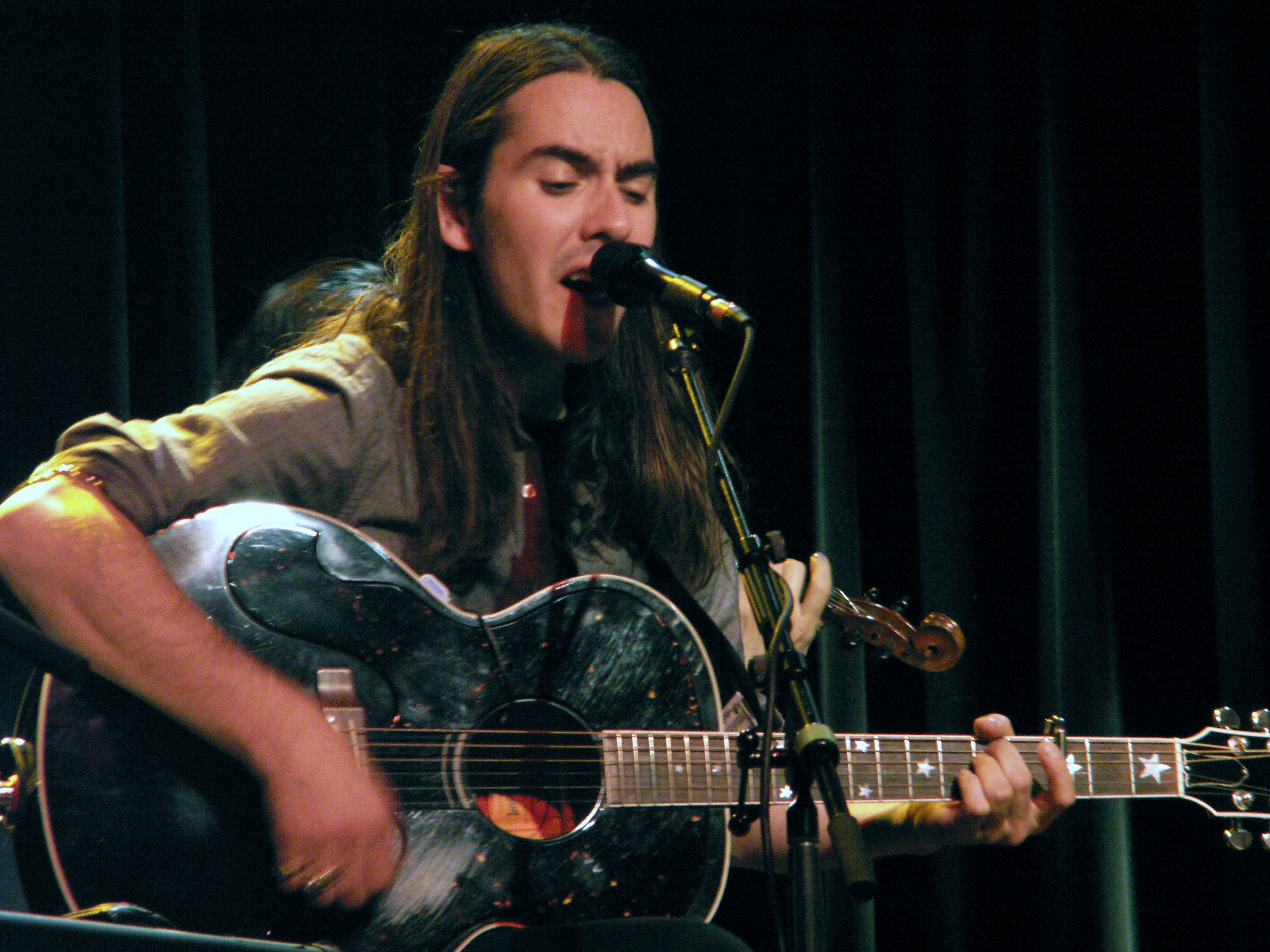
Harrison performing in Seattle, 2010

Harrison's dedication to his father's musical legacy resulted in a week-long run of shows on Conan in September 2014, dedicated to George Harrison, which culminated in a sold-out George Fest event at The Fonda Theatre in Los Angeles, which was later released as an album and documentary. He participated in The Night That Changed America: A Grammy Salute to The Beatles the same year.

Harrison produced George Fest, a live album and concert DVD package documenting the George Fest tribute concert in honor of his father. The tribute was held at the Fonda Theatre in Los Angeles on 28 September 2014. The album and documentary were released on 26 February 2016.

In 2017 Harrison played his first-ever solo show at the Panorama Festival in New York City. Harrison released his first solo album, In Parallel, in October 2017.

In 2019, he toured as the opening act for Jeff Lynne's ELO, and typically performed with the group singing the vocals for the Traveling Wilburys song "Handle with Care."

Following two live performances in Omeara, London, on 18 and 19 October 2023, Harrison's second solo album, Innerstanding, was released on 20 October 2023.

Harrison formed the band Dragonflies with Nigel Godrich after he contacted Godrich for some advice on Innerstanding. The band features Harrison on vocals and guitar, Godrich on production, Joey Waronker on percussion, and string arrangements by David Campbell. They released their debut album on September 18, 2026.

== Film composing ==
In between working on albums, Harrison, along with Paul Hicks, began their film composing partnership scoring the 2013 film Beautiful Creatures. In 2014, they scored the film Learning to Drive and the television series The Divide. In 2016, they composed music for the Amazon Video television series Good Girls Revolt, the film, Seattle Road, and the WGN TV series Outsiders.

In 2018, Harrison and Hicks received a nomination for 'Best Music Score' at the International Documentary Association Awards for their work on the Sundance Film Festival Award-winning documentary Matangi/Maya/M.I.A.

More recently, Harrison wrote and recorded the title song for the Netflix original series Dogs and, along with Paul Hicks, scored the four-part HBO documentary series The Case Against Adnan Syed, the 2020 RZA movie Cut Throat City and the sci-fi romance movie Futra Days in 2024.

== Discography ==
=== Solo ===
==== Albums ====
- In Parallel (2017)
- Innerstanding (2023)

=== With Thenewno2 ===
==== Albums ====
- You Are Here (2008)
- thefearofmissingout (2012)
- Beautiful Creatures (2013)

==== EPs ====
- EP001 (2006)
- EP002 (2011)

=== With Fistful of Mercy ===
==== Albums ====
- As I Call You Down (2010)

=== With Dragonflies ===
==== Albums ====
- Dragonflies (2026)

==== Single ====
- "Slower"

=== Other collaborations ===
- Brainwashed (2002)
- Concert for George (2003)
- Instant Karma: The Amnesty International Campaign to Save Darfur (2007)
- 8 Diagrams (2007)
- George Fest (2016)
- The Road: Part I (2017)
- The Road: Part II / Lost Highway (2019)
- Huun-Huur-Tu / Carmen Rizzo / Dhani Harrison - Dreamers In The Field (2024)
- To Save a Child: An Intimate Live Concert (Eric Clapton album w/"Give Me Love (Give Me Peace On Earth)" feat. Dhani Harrison) (2024)
- Ivan Shopov, Carmen Rizzo & Dhani Harrison (feat. New Bulgarian Voices & Georgi Petkov) - Ascending Into Silence (2025)

== Personal life ==
Harrison married Sólveig "Sóla" Káradóttir in 2012. They announced their separation in 2016. The couple had no children.

As of 2024, Harrison's partner is musician Mereki. Around April of 2025, Mereki gave birth to Dhani’s daughter, Lilou Mizu. This was confirmed by Dhani’s mother, Olivia Harrison, on Rita Wilson’s podcast in late 2025.

== Video games ==
Harrison collaborated in the development of The Beatles: Rock Band, a music video game released on 9 September 2009 on the Xbox 360, PlayStation 3 and Wii gaming platforms. He was instrumental in the creation of the game and urged McCartney and Starr to participate. When asked about the game production Dhani stated, "I took the project to Apple and sort of convinced everybody to have a presentation. My job description is...being enthusiastic. We've been working on it for the past two years. This is the first one that is going to be totally, historically accurate. It's been a real headache, but it's been the most enjoyable work I've done in my life."

To promote the game's release, he appeared on The Tonight Show with Conan O'Brien on 8 September 2009 and at the end of the show they played "Birthday" with Dhani on drums, Conan O'Brien on bass, and Aaron Bleyaert and Mark Pender on guitar.

In 2009, Harrison told the Chicago Tribune in an interview that he was "working on Rock Band 3 and making the controllers more real so people can actually learn how to play music while playing the game".
