= Matangi/Maya/M.I.A. =

- Theatrical release poster
- Directed by: Steve Loveridge
- Produced by: Steve Loveridge; Lori Cheatle; Andrew Goldman; Paul Mezey
- Starring: M.I.A.
- Edited by: Marina Katz; Gabriel Rhodes
- Music by: Dhani Harrison; Paul Hicks
- Production companies: Cinereach; Hard Working Movies; Doc Society
- Distributed by: Dogwoof (United Kingdom); Abramorama (United States)
- Release dates: 21 January 2018 (Sundance); 21 September 2018 (United Kingdom); 28 September 2018 (United States)
- Running time: 97 minutes
- Countries: United Kingdom; United States
- Languages: English; Tamil

Matangi/Maya/M.I.A. is a 2018 biographical documentary film about English rapper and artist M.I.A. Directed by Steve Loveridge, the film follows 22 years in the rapper's life, her rise to fame and her perspective on the controversies sparked over her music, public appearances and political activism.

The film premiered at the 2018 Sundance Film Festival and has appeared at several other international festivals since. It was released in select cinemas in the United Kingdom on 21 September 2018 and in the United States on 28 September 2018. The documentary was well-received, winning the World Cinema Documentary Special Jury Award for Steve Loveridge at the Sundance Film Festival.

== Production ==
The film was in production as early as 2011 by Steven Loveridge, who was a long-term friend of Maya Arulpragasam (stage name M.I.A.). She gave him tapes and footage from her personal collection to build the film.

In July 2013, Loveridge released a teaser video on YouTube and his personal Tumblr page, responding to his dissatisfaction with Interscope Records and legal and funding delays associated with the project. The video was pulled from YouTube after a copyright claim was made by the International Federation of the Phonographic Industry, on behalf of Interscope and Roc Nation, the label representing M.I.A. Loveridge quit the project, stating he would "rather die" than work on it any further. The video had attracted the attention of the production company Cinereach, and in November, Loveridge restarted the project and the UK non-profit documentary support organization BRITDOC Foundation announced funding.

The score was made by Dhani Harrison and Paul Hicks. The music supervisor was Tracy McKnight, and the film features samples of the M.I.A. tracks "Born Free", "Paper Planes", "Bad Girls" and "Borders".

== Release ==
The film premiered at the 2018 Sundance Film Festival on 21 January 2018. The Special Jury Award for the film's category, World Cinema Documentary, was awarded to Loveridge and M.I.A.

In February, it appeared at the 68th Berlin International Film Festival; in March, the True/False Film Festival in Missouri, CPH:DOX in Denmark, and New Directors/New Films Festival in New York; in April, the San Francisco International Film Festival, BAFICI in Argentina, and Sarasota Film Festival; in May, Maryland Film Festival, Hot Docs Canadian International Documentary Festival in Canada, Los Angeles Asian Pacific Film Festival, Beldocs International Documentary Film Festival in Serbia, Docs Against Gravity in Poland, and Seattle International Film Festival; and in June, the Biografilm Festival in Italy, Beat Film Festival in Russia, Encounters Festival in South Africa, Sydney Film Festival (where it was selected for the official competition), Art Film Fest in Slovakia, and AFI Docs Film Festival.

On 1 May, M.I.A. reported that she was blocked from boarding a flight in London to Toronto for the Hot Docs Festival, after immigration officials identified a stamp in her passport. Festival spokespeople said in a statement that M.I.A.'s representatives were working with authorities to resolve the situation. Later, M.I.A. flew to the U.S. and travelled to Canada successfully by land from Buffalo, New York, and attended the festival.

On 20 June, M.I.A. announced that the film would be theatrically released in the United Kingdom on 21 September 2018 and in the United States on 28 September. It also screened at the Melbourne International Film Festival in Australia and Way Out West Festival in Sweden in August 2018. The film was theatrically released in Canada on 5 October 2018.

== Reception ==
After the film's premiere, Loveridge said that his intention with the film was to give background and context to Maya (M.I.A.) as a person, in the current time period where "media moves so fast". He had disagreed with media coverage of her being presented as a "controversial pop star" without an audience understanding her origins. He tried to centre the film more on the backstory of Maya, her upbringing, migration to the United Kingdom and the relationship between her father, his political activism and the civil conflict in Sri Lanka in 2010. This was distinct to the expectations that M.I.A. had for the project, which is that it would become a "tour documentary".

M.I.A. had not seen the film prior to the premiere, suggesting in an interview at the Sundance Film Festival that Loveridge had been absent for the last four years, communicating with her sporadically. Loveridge responded and said during the same time period he had "been drowned in MIA and her story and like my all day every day for the last four years". She remarked to Andreas Hale (Billboard): "[Loveridge] took all the shows where I look good and tossed it in the bin. Eventually, if you squash all the music together from the film, it makes for about four minutes. I didn't know that my music wouldn't really be a part of this. I find that to be a little hard, because that is my life." She later remarked that she felt Loveridge had "boiled the film down to an essence of what people already know about me" but that she "could still make 20 other films and not crossover with what Steve has made". Loveridge said that his film "wasn't about music", and that it was necessary to keep distance between himself and the artist during the editing process, and avoid the subject of the film influencing their portrayal as any documentary filmmaker would.

The film has an 88% approval rating on Rotten Tomatoes and a weighted average of 70/100 on Metacritic, with the former site reporting the critical consensus as, "Matangi/Maya/M.I.A. makes up in energy and ambition what it lacks in objective distance, offering fans a personal perspective on a singular career." Reviewers praised its candid portrayal of M.I.A. with the film's focus being weighted towards its subject's life, identity and ideas, but gave mixed opinions on the storytelling threads presented by Loveridge using archival material. Spencer Kornhaber (The Atlantic) wrote that the film is a "fantastic and kinetic fulfillment of Maya Arulpragasam's desire, back then, to be heard as more than an entertainer". Charlie Phillips (The Guardian) criticised that M.I.A. received no directorial credit, given that from her own footage is where the film "sources its greatest energy" but that "for once [M.I.A.] truly gets to control her own narrative". However, the visual quality of the footage used concerned other critics. Simran Hans (Sight & Sound) suggested that the "blurry and shakily shot [...] images suffer when blown up to the cinema screen", but praised M.I.A. as "an artist who documents things as they happen, rather than shooting material that slots neatly into a shiny, predetermined PR narrative". There was fault found with Matangi/Maya/M.I.A. for lacking exploration of M.I.A.'s musical process, style or production, atypical of biographical documentaries in the music genre. Being a biography, Sam Mac (Slant Magazine) remarked that Loveridge's approach to editorial portrayal of the artist was "empathetic, admiring but critical", but noted that he had elided some details in the retelling of events, like that M.I.A. "crossed a line" by tweeting a journalist's phone number in response to the negative press story published by The New York Times.

== Awards ==
Award	Category	Nominee	Result
2018 Sundance Film Festival	World Cinema Documentary Special Jury Award	Steve Loveridge; M.I.A.	Won
