= Congratulations (Traveling Wilburys song) =

Song by Traveling Wilburys

from the album Traveling Wilburys Vol. 1
- A-side: "End of the Line"
- Released: 18 October 1988
- Recorded: May–June 1988
- Genre: Ballad
- Length: 3:30
- Label: Wilbury
- Songwriter: Traveling Wilburys
- Producers: Otis Wilbury, Nelson Wilbury

"Congratulations" is a song by the English-American supergroup Traveling Wilburys. It features member Bob Dylan singing lead vocals.

== Background ==
I think the tune on that one was, we worked out the tune straight off, but Bob [Dylan] basically had the idea. [...] The difference was, the rest of us had more time but Bob [Dylan] had to go on the road, and we knew he couldn't come over and do more vocals again, so we had to get his immediately.

— George Harrison, 1990

The song was primarily written by Bob Dylan. Don Smith, an engineer who worked with Tom Petty, recalled the recording of the track: "We were right in the middle of getting the sounds for 'Last Night,' and Bob starts coming up with the rhythm for 'Congratulations,'"

== Reception ==
According to author Oliver Trager: "At first glance, 'Congratulations' comes off as one of the Wilburys' bleaker songs—until the humor is heard, that is. A repeated listen or two reveals a composition in which the narrator seems to be actually telling the person he’s congratulating to screw off." Stephen Thomas Erlewine stated in a review for Traveling Wilburys Vol. 1 on AllMusic that it was a "offhand heartbreak tune" Matthew Greenwald stated in a review for the song on AllMusic that "Although it's a sad song about the disintegration of a romance, there is a sense of humor here, and this removes the stigma of the heavy expectations that the group no doubt faced during their formation." and that "Some excellent harmony vocals from George Harrison and Jeff Lynne cap the arrangement, adding to the overall camaraderie that is prevalent throughout the album."

== Personnel ==
According to Olof Björner, a researcher on Bob Dylan: the (?)s indicate that the song has alternate personnel credits for the instrument listed on the Jeff Lynne Song Database.

- Bob Dylan – lead vocals, acoustic guitar,
- Roy Orbison – acoustic guitar, backing vocals
- George Harrison – acoustic guitar, backing vocals
- Tom Petty – acoustic guitar, backing vocals
- Jeff Lynne – guitars, bass, synthesizer, keyboards, backing vocals
- Drum machine – drums(?)
- Jim Keltner – drums(?)
- Ray Cooper – percussion

== Sources ==
- Leng, Simon (2006). While My Guitar Gently Weeps: The Music of George Harrison. Milwaukee, WI: Hal Leonard. ISBN 978-1-4234-0609-9.
- Smax, Willy (dir.) (2007). The True History of the Traveling Wilburys (DVD). Traveling Wilburys; Willy Smax and Olivia Harrison (producers). Wilbury Record Co.
- Trager, Oliver (2004). Keys to the Rain: The Definitive Bob Dylan Encyclopedia. Billboard Books. ISBN 0-8230-7974-0.
- Zollo, Paul (2005). Conversations with Tom Petty. New York, NY: Omnibus Press. ISBN 1-84449-815-8.
