= The Fear of Missing Out =

thefearofmissingout

Studio album by thenewno2
- Released: 31 July 2012
- Studios: FPSHOT & H.O.T. West
- Genre: Alternative rock
- Length: 45:58
- Label: H.O.T. Records Ltd.
- Producer: pHd

Thenewno2 chronology
EP002 (2011)	thefearofmissingout (2012)	Beautiful Creatures (2013)

Dhani Harrison chronology
As I Call You Down (2010)	thefearofmissingout (2012)	Beautiful Creatures (2013)

Professional ratings
Review scores
Source	Rating
Rolling Stone	3/5 stars

The Fear of Missing Out (stylised as thefearofmissingout) is the second studio album by the alternative rock group thenewno2. H.O.T. Records released it on 31 July 2012. The album was produced by band members Dhani Harrison and Paul Hicks using the name "pHd".

As part of the promotion for the album, thenewno2 released the track "Make It Home" on the band's Facebook page as well as to members of the band's website e-mail listing, with the publication Rolling Stone additionally receiving the single. The album received generally positive reviews. Greg Kot of the Chicago Tribune described its music as "appropriately fidgety and restless, a beehive of sound that almost subliminally coalesces into songs".

== Track listing ==
No.	Title	Featuring	Length
1.	"Station"	Holly Marilyn	5:04
2.	"Wide Awake"		4:41
3.	"Timezone"		3:44
4.	"I Won't Go"		4:05
5.	"Hanging On"	Thorunn Antonia	5:53
6.	"Looking Beyond"		3:06
7.	"thewaitaround"	RZA, The Black Knights	3:40
8.	"Staring Out to Sea"	Ben Harper, Thorunn Antonia	6:30
9.	"Make It Home"		3:17
10.	"The Number"	Thorunn Antonia	5:58
Total length:			45:58
