= Traveling Wilburys Vol. 1 =

Studio album by Traveling Wilburys
- Released: October 18, 1988
- Recorded: April–May 1988
- Studios: FPSHOT, Lucky Studios, Dave Stewart Studios
- Genres: Folk rock, country rock
- Length: 36:22
- Label: Warner Bros.
- Producers: Nelson Wilbury; Otis Wilbury

Traveling Wilburys chronology
Traveling Wilburys Vol. 1 (1988)	Traveling Wilburys Vol. 3 (1990)

Singles from Traveling Wilburys Vol. 1
- 1. "Handle with Care" Released: 17 October 1988; 2. "End of the Line" Released: 23 January 1989; 3. "Heading for the Light" Released: May 1989

Traveling Wilburys Vol. 1 is the debut studio album by the English-American supergroup Traveling Wilburys, comprising George Harrison, Jeff Lynne, Bob Dylan, Roy Orbison and Tom Petty. It was released in October 1988 to commercial success and critical acclaim. Although Harrison had long planned to start such a band, the project came about through happenstance. Harrison was in Los Angeles and in need of a B-side for a single from his album Cloud Nine, which resulted in the participants collaborating informally on the song "Handle with Care" at Dylan's home.

Adopting alter egos as the five Wilbury brothers, they then recorded a full album, produced by Lynne and Harrison (under the pseudonyms Otis and Nelson Wilbury respectively). It was the only Wilburys album to feature Roy Orbison and the final album featuring Orbison to be released during his lifetime - he died suddenly of a heart attack less than two months after its release. The group continued as a four-piece after his death.

The Traveling Wilburys Vol. 1 was nominated for the Album of the Year award at the 1990 Grammy Awards (which was won by Bonnie Raitt's Nick of Time) and helped revitalise the careers of Dylan and Petty. It has been certified triple platinum by the Recording Industry Association of America.

== Background ==
In early April 1988, George Harrison was in Los Angeles and needed to record a B-side for a European 12-inch single. Jeff Lynne was also in Los Angeles writing and producing some tracks for Roy Orbison on his album Mystery Girl (released posthumously), as well as Tom Petty’s first solo album, Full Moon Fever. While having dinner with Lynne and Orbison, Harrison related how he needed to record a new track and wanted to do it the next day. Harrison asked if Lynne would help, and Orbison offered his old friend his hand as well, seeing how fun it would be. Needing a studio at short notice, Harrison called Bob Dylan, who agreed to let them use his garage studio. After dinner, Harrison stopped by Petty’s house to pick up a guitar he had left there, and invited Petty along as well. Gathering at Dylan’s Malibu home the following day, Harrison, Lynne, Orbison and Petty worked on a song that Harrison had started writing for the occasion, "Handle with Care". At first, Dylan's role was that of a host, maintaining a barbecue to feed the musicians; at Harrison's invitation, Dylan then joined them in writing lyrics for the song. The ensemble taped the track on Dylan's Ampex recording equipment, with all five sharing the vocals.

"Handle with Care" was considered too good to be used as a B-side, so Harrison decided to form a band and record another nine songs for an album. The group got together again for nine days in May, recording the basic tracks and vocals at Dave Stewart’s home studio in Los Angeles. Overdubs and mixing were carried out in England at Harrison’s home studio, FPSHOT (short for Friar Park Studio, Henley-on-Thames).

Masquerading as the Wilbury brothers, the participants would be known as Nelson (Harrison), Otis (Lynne), Lucky (Dylan), Lefty (Orbison), and Charlie T. Jr. (Petty) Wilbury, with drummer Jim Keltner credited as Buster Sidebury. Harrison was no stranger to the use of alternate identities, as he had adopted them with Sgt. Pepper's Lonely Hearts Club Band and with his plethora of pseudonyms as a session musician, including L'Angelo Misterioso, George O'Hara and Hari Georgeson. During the Beatles' first tour of Scotland, in 1960, he had used the pseudonym "Carl Harrison", in reference to one of his favourite musicians, Carl Perkins. With the Traveling Wilburys, this concept was taken a step further, since the participants' real names do not appear anywhere on the album, liner notes, or the songwriting credits.

With Harrison having the greatest claim to the band, he signed them to Warner Bros. Records, which distributed his solo recordings, and incorporated their own Wilbury Records label, in addition to producing the sessions with Lynne that spring. Petty subsequently signed to Warner Bros. himself as a solo artist, and one of the company's subsidiaries, Reprise Records, released Lynne's solo album Armchair Theatre in 1990.

== Songwriting ==
According to statements by Harrison in the documentary The True History of the Traveling Wilburys (filmed in 1988 about the making of the album and re-released on the bonus DVD included in The Traveling Wilburys Collection), the whole band gave various contributions to all songs, although each song was mainly written by a single member; the joint songwriting credit came from the fact that giving individualised credits looked egotistical.

Lynne commented that the songwriting process was relaxed and enjoyable:

We would arrive about twelve or one o'clock and have some coffee. Somebody would say, 'What about this?' and start on a riff. Then we'd all join in, and it'd turn into something. We'd finish around midnight and just sit for a bit while Roy would tell us fabulous stories about Sun Records or hanging out with Elvis. Then we'd come back the next day to work on another one. That's why the songs are so good and fresh—because they haven't been second-guessed and dissected and replaced. It's so tempting to add stuff to a song when you've got unlimited time.

However, the publishing credits on the Collection book are more revealing about the lead songwriters, as each of the credited publishers belongs to a single member:

- Harrison's Umlaut Corporation (formerly Ganga Publishing) is credited for "Handle with Care", "Heading for the Light", "End of the Line" and the bonus track "Maxine", identifying him as the main writer of those songs. In a behind-the-scenes interview included among the bonus features on the 2003 DVD release of the 2002 tribute Concert for George, Petty recalls that the lyrics to "Handle with Care" were the result of a game held by Harrison during a barbecue outside his home studio, with all of the band members (including himself) shouting out lines and Harrison keeping the ones that stuck and writing them in a notebook. According to Petty, the line "Oh, the sweet smell of success" is his.
- Dylan, credited via his Special Rider Music publisher, wrote "Dirty World" (according to Harrison and Lynne's recollections on the documentary, Dylan and all the other band members gave their input to the song by pitching in funny lines to complete the lyric line "He loves your ..."), the long narrative of "Tweeter and the Monkey Man" (which was apparently intended as either a parody of or tribute to Bruce Springsteen's early, verbose songs), "Congratulations", and the other bonus track "Like a Ship".
- Petty, published by Gone Gator Music, wrote "Last Night" (again, with substantial lyrical contributions from the entire band) and "Margarita".
- Lynne's publisher, Shard End Music (named after his birthplace), identifies him as the main writer of "Rattled" and "Not Alone Any More".

The separation was not repeated for the publishing credits of Traveling Wilburys Vol. 3, which show all songs as being published by all four publishers.

== Release and aftermath ==
Professional ratings
Review scores
Source	Rating
AllMusic	4.5/5 stars
Blender	4/5 stars
Christgau's Record Guide: The '80s	A−
The Encyclopedia of Popular Music	4/5 stars
Entertainment Weekly	A−
Houston Chronicle	3.5/5 stars
Mojo	5/5 stars
Q	4/5 stars
Rolling Stone	4/5 stars
Uncut	5/5 stars

Released on October 18, 1988, in the US, Volume One became a surprise commercial success, reaching number 3 in the US and selling 2 million copies there within six months. It was released on October 24 in the UK, where it reached number 16. With over 50 weeks on the US charts, The Traveling Wilburys Vol. 1 was later certified triple-platinum by the Recording Industry Association of America. While Harrison and Petty had recent successes, Dylan, Orbison (who died of a sudden heart attack on December 6, 1988) and Lynne had not seen an album climb that high in several years. At the time, no Dylan album had ever achieved two million in sales. As one critic put it, it was "one of the great commercial coups of the decade". The single "Handle with Care" was a significant hit in the UK charts, peaking at number 21, and an even bigger hit in Australia (number 3) and New Zealand (number 4), though it stalled at number 45 on the US Billboard Hot 100.

Most critics said the group's modest ambitions were fresh and relaxing. During 1989 and 1990 the album won many accolades, including a Grammy for Best Rock Performance by a Duo or Group. The album was also nominated for Album of the Year. In his book The Encyclopedia of Popular Music, Colin Larkin describes the Traveling Wilburys as "the last of the great supergroups" and writes of the band's accidental origins: "This wonderful potpourri of stars reintroduced 'having a good time' to their vocabulary and the result was not a Harrison solo album but the superb debut of the Traveling Wilburys. The outing proved to be a major success, bringing out the best of each artist; in particular, this [album] proved to be the marvellous swan song for Roy Orbison who tragically died soon afterwards."

After Harrison’s distribution deal with Warner Bros. expired in 1995, ownership of the Dark Horse Records catalogue as well as the two Traveling Wilburys albums reverted to Harrison and the albums went out of print. On June 12, 2007, Volume One and Vol. 3 were reissued by Rhino Records as The Traveling Wilburys Collection, packaged together with bonus tracks and a DVD. The box set debuted at number 1 on the UK Albums Chart and number 9 on the US Billboard 200.

== Track listing ==
All tracks are written by Traveling Wilburys.

Side one
No.	Title	Lead vocals	Length
1.	"Handle with Care"	George Harrison, Roy Orbison	3:19
2.	"Dirty World"	Bob Dylan with Harrison, Orbison, Jeff Lynne and Tom Petty	3:30
3.	"Rattled"	Lynne with Petty, Harrison and Orbison	3:00
4.	"Last Night"	Petty with Orbison	3:48
5.	"Not Alone Any More"	Orbison	3:24

Side two
No.	Title	Lead vocals	Length
6.	"Congratulations"	Dylan	3:30
7.	"Heading for the Light"	Harrison with Lynne	3:37
8.	"Margarita"	Dylan and Petty with Lynne	3:15
9.	"Tweeter and the Monkey Man"	Dylan	5:30
10.	"End of the Line"	Harrison, Lynne and Orbison with Petty	3:30

Bonus tracks on the 2007 CD reissue
No.	Title	Lead vocals	Length
11.	"Maxine"	Harrison	2:49
12.	"Like a Ship"	Dylan	3:31

== Personnel ==
Traveling Wilburys

- Nelson Wilbury (George Harrison) – electric and acoustic guitars, slide guitar, Dobro, lead and backing vocals
- Otis Wilbury (Jeff Lynne) – electric and acoustic guitars, bass, keyboards; drums and cowbell on "Handle with Care", lead and backing vocals
- Charlie T. Wilbury Jr (Tom Petty) – acoustic guitar, lead and backing vocals
- Lefty Wilbury (Roy Orbison) – acoustic guitar, lead and backing vocals
- Lucky Wilbury (Bob Dylan) – 12-string acoustic guitar, harmonica on "Handle with Care", lead and backing vocals

Additional musicians

- Buster Sidebury (Jim Keltner) – drums (all tracks except "Handle with Care")
- Jim Horn – saxophones
- Ray Cooper – percussion
- Ian Wallace – tom-toms on "Handle with Care"

Production

- Otis Wilbury – production
- Nelson Wilbury – production
- Bill Bottrell – engineering (Los Angeles)
- Don Smith – engineering (Los Angeles)
- Richard Dodd – engineering (Henley)
- Phil McDonald – engineering (Henley)
- Michael Palin (as Hugh Jampton, E.F. Norti-Bitz Reader in Applied Jacket) – album liner notes
- David Costa – original art direction for Wherefore Art?
- Neal Preston – sleeve photography
- Gered Mankowitz – sleeve photography
- Chris Smith – sleeve photography

== Accolades ==
=== Grammy Awards ===
Year	Nominee / work	Award	Result
1990	The Traveling Wilburys Vol. 1	Best Rock Performance by a Duo or Group with Vocal	Won
1990	The Traveling Wilburys Vol. 1	Album of the Year	Nominated

=== American Music Awards ===
Year	Nominee / work	Award	Result
1990	Traveling Wilburys (performer)	Favorite Pop/Rock New Artist	Nominated

== Charts ==
=== Weekly charts ===
Chart (1988–89)	Peak position
Australian ARIA Albums Chart	1
Austrian Albums Chart	3
Canadian RPM 100 Albums	1
Canadian The Record Top Albums	1
Dutch Mega Albums Chart	33
Japanese Oricon Albums Chart	46
New Zealand Albums Chart	2
Norwegian VG-lista Albums	2
Swedish Albums Chart	2
Swiss Albums Chart	6
UK Albums Chart	16
US Billboard 200	3
US Cash Box Top 200 Albums	1
West German Media Control Albums	10

=== Year-end charts ===
Chart (1988)	Position
Dutch Albums Chart	99
UK Albums Chart	78

Chart (1989)	Position
Australian Albums Chart	1
Austrian Albums Chart	25
Canadian RPM Year-End	3
Swiss Albums Chart	20
UK Albums Chart	99
US Billboard 200	8

== Certifications ==
Region	Certification	Certified units/sales
Australia (ARIA)	6× Platinum	420,000^{^}
Canada (Music Canada)	6× Platinum	600,000^{^}
Germany (BVMI)	Gold	250,000^{^}
Sweden (GLF)	Gold	50,000^{^}
Switzerland (IFPI Switzerland)	Gold	25,000^{^}
United Kingdom (BPI)	Platinum	300,000^{^}
United States (RIAA)	3× Platinum	3,000,000^{^}
^{^} Shipments figures based on certification alone.
