= EP001 =

EP by Thenewno2
- Released: 28 August 2006; 1 February 2007 (iTunes)
- Genre: Indie rock
- Length: 17:39
- Label: HOT Records Ltd.
- Producer: Thenewno2

Thenewno2 chronology
EP001 (2006)	You Are Here (2008)

EP001 is the debut release by Thenewno2, a band composed of Dhani Harrison and Oliver Hecks. Originally released as a promotional single on 28 August 2006, the EP was released on the iTunes Store in early February 2007. The songs on the EP feature female vocals by Amanda Butterworth.

== Distribution ==
Leftover copies of the EP were initially made available for purchase on 24 October 2006. On 29 November 2006, Thenewno2 announced that it could also be purchased at Amoeba Music, 6400 Sunset Blvd. Hollywood, CA. As time went by Dhani and Oli realised that they were unable to keep up with the constant demand for more copies of their CD EP001 being pressed and so on 6 February 2007 they announced that their EP could now be purchased via download at iTunes.

== In film ==
Thenewno2's track "People" was featured in the 90 second short film Now You Don't Know What To Think. Their track "Truly" appears in the Warren Miller film Playground. The track can be heard in the section about Speedriding. Playground had scheduled showings in cinemas in Canada in November–December 2007, and also was shown in the UK.

== Track listing ==
All songs written and performed by Dhani Harrison and Oliver Hecks and published by Harrisongs Ltd.

1. "Say" – 3:51
2. "Out of Mind" – 4:15
3. "Lord Lord" – 5:00
4. "Truly" – 4:33
  - Strings on "Truly" by Paul Hicks.

== Personnel ==
- Dhani Harrison – Lead Vocals, Guitars, Synthesizers, Ukulele, Bass, Programming
- Nick Fyfe – Bass
- Oliver Hecks – Synthesizers, Drums, Percussion, Programming
