= Mereki =

Australian pop musician

Mereki Rose Beach
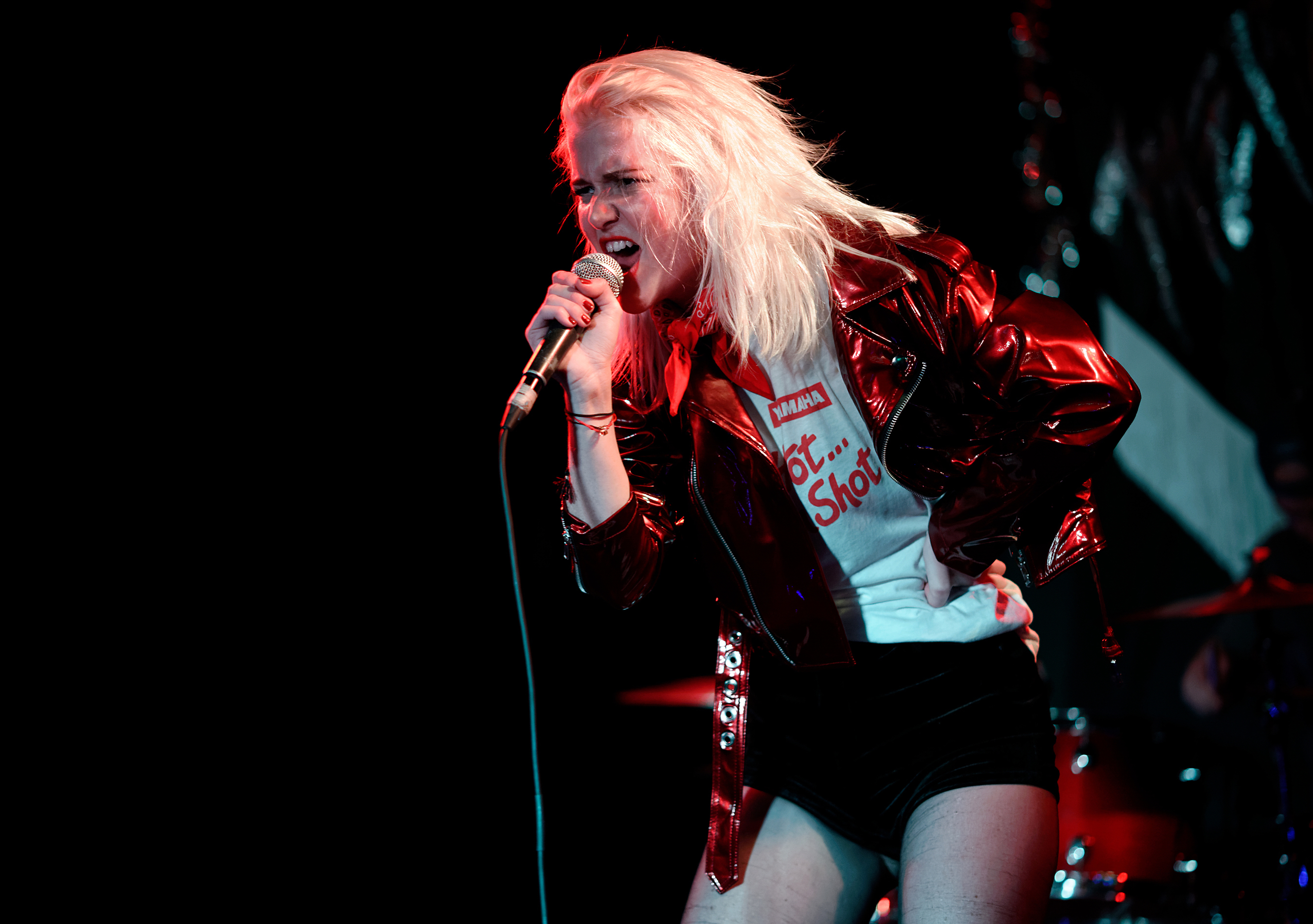
- Mereki in 2015

Background information
- Also known as: Mereki
- Genre: Indie pop
- Occupations: Musician, singer-songwriter
- Years active: 2012–present
- Website: https://www.merekimusic.com/

Mereki Rose Beach, better known by her stage name Mereki, is an Australian singer-songwriter.

== Early life and education ==
From an early age, Mereki participated in school choir. During her university years in Melbourne, she joined her first band, which marked the beginning of her path as a singer-songwriter.

== Career ==
Mereki has lived in London, Scotland, Melbourne, and New York City before settling in Los Angeles, where her career developed.

She started her career as a singer, but began writing and releasing professional music with Grammy Award-winning producers Dan Nigro, Justin Raisen, and SADPONY. She was spotted by Ariel Rechtshaid, prompting their collaboration on "Golden Boy", recorded by Kylie Minogue in 2014.

Mereki has writing credits with Phantogram, and Atrak, and guest artist and co-writer credits on tracks with Dhani Harrison, Basenji, Flight Facilities, Holychild, and Goldroom. While fronting Goldroom, she performed across the US and internationally, before going on to perform with electronic act Flight Facilities as their featured vocalist on the duo's sold-out North American tour.

In 2013 DCUP released "Don't Be Shy" remix, feat. Mereki. A music video to accompany the track, directed and executive produced by Australian director Tim White and starring Japanese fashion model Kozue Akimoto, was released to accompany the single.

Mereki's debut solo single "Blue Lake" was released in 2014. Mereki released a few singles that landed her music in a Victoria's Secret commercial. In 2017, Mereki released her EP Beach. The songs on Beach have Mereki's signature style, a distinctly pop-feel with positive messaging, while tracks like "Spiritual", "French Kissing" and "Got It All" also hold an ethereal, dreamy quality.

She made her live solo UK debut at the Glastonbury Festival 2022 and followed this up with another performance at the festival in 2023.

In 2022 Mereki released her single "Presence" and the follow-up track, "Twin Flame", in 2023. Her debut full-length solo album, Death of a Cloud was released on 24 March 2023, via BMG and her own label BUNBUN Records.

In 2025 Mereki released her single "Truv Luv" and the follow-up track "Hollywood Sign". Mereki released her second album, Buttercup, on September 19, 2025 on BunBun Records. It was mixed and mastered by Grammy-winner Paul Hicks and features musicians such as Dhani Harrison, Fred Armisen, Sam Stewart.

== Other activities ==
In 2016 Mereki created Mereki's Clubhouse, a pop-up event platform with a focus on kindness and creating spaces to give a voice to up-and-coming female artists. The Clubhouse motto "Be Kind" grew into a non-profit organisation of the same name, which then held an annual Holiday Benefit Concert – the last event selling out the legendary Troubadour in 2019. Past participants include Sharon Van Etten, John C. Reilly, and Jim James.

== Personal life ==
As of 2024, Mereki's partner is musician Dhani Harrison.

== Discography ==
Year	Song	Notes
2014	Blue Lake	
2015	Jenny (feat. Kitten)	
2015	Sirens	
2017	French Kissing	
2017	Got It All	
2017	Friend Again	
2017	It Will	
2017	I'll Be Yours Tonight (Merry Christmas)	
2018	Spiritual	
2022	Presence	
2023	Twin Flame	
2023	Wake Up Dead	
2023	Lilies of the Valley	
2023	Phone Call	
2023	Wasted Love	
2023	The Garden	
2023	Purple Moons	
2023	End of the World	
2023	In Everything	
2025	Tru Luv	
2025	Hollywood Sign	
2025	Sunflower Smile	
2025	Honey Hurricane	
2025	Real Real Love	
2025	Bunny Soft	
2025	Save Yourself	
2025	Miracle	
2025	Stuck In Paradise	
2025	Aeroplane Mode	

== As a guest artist ==
Year	Song	Notes
2012	Next To Mexico (Good Night Keaton feat. Mereki)	
2013	Only You Can Show Me (Goldroom feat. Mereki)	
2013	Don't Be Shy (DCUP feat. Mereki)	
2014	Run This World (That's Nice Mix) (Keljet feat. Mereki)	
2014	Real deal (banvox feat. Mereki)	
2014	Sun Is Mine (Futurecop! feat. Mereki)	
2015	BAD THINGS (KSUKE feat. Mereki)	
2015	Gossamer (Chants feat. Mereki)	
2015	All Underwater (Chants feat. Mereki)	
2016	Not Invited (HOLYCHILD feat. Mereki)	
2017	Don't Let Go (Basenji feat. Mereki)	
2019	Yellow Flowers (Goldroom feat. Mereki)	
2019	You're Incredible (Goldroom feat. Mereki)	
2019	London Water (Dhani Harrison feat. Mereki)	
2019	Trust (Goldroom feat. Mereki)	
2021	Poseidon (Keep Me Safe) (Dhani Harrison feat. Mereki)	
2023	I Think (Goldroom feat. Mereki)	
2023	Wolves Around The City (Dhani Harrison feat. Mereki)	
2023	The Dancing Tree (Dhani Harrison feat. Mereki)	

=== Albums ===
- Death of a Cloud (2023)
- Buttercup (2025)

=== EP ===
- Beach (2017)
- Friar Park Sessions (2024)
