= You Are Here (Thenewno2 album) =

Studio album by Thenewno2
- Released: 1 August 2008
- Recorded: FPSHOT
- Genre: Indie rock
- Length: 49:47
- Label: HOT Records Ltd.
- Producer: Thenewno2

Thenewno2 chronology
EP001 (2006)	You Are Here (2008)	EP002 (2011)

Singles from You Are Here
- 1. "Another John Doe" Released: 31 March 2008

Professional ratings
Review scores
Source	Rating
Rolling Stone	3/5 stars

You Are Here is the debut album by Thenewno2. It was released online on 1 August 2008 and in stores on 31 March 2009. The album was written, produced, and performed by Dhani Harrison and Oliver Hecks. The album was recorded and mixed by Paul Hicks. "Another John Doe", a single from the album, was released via iTunes on 31 March 2008. The iTunes edition includes the two bonus tracks "Jokes On You" and "You Gotta Wait".

Two tracks from the album, "Crazy Tuesday" and "Another John Doe", were played on radio station 103.1 on 19 June and 20 June 2008. The song "Yomp" was featured as a downloadable song for the Rock Band series, and "Crazy Tuesday" was featured as one of the 20 free songs that were downloadable with the purchase of Rock Band 2. The rest of the album was announced to be released on Rock Band on Dhani Harrison's MySpace bulletin, though the rest of the album remains unreleased in the game.

In an interview about the album, Dhani stated "I started off with a few demos and Oli had a few demos. When I was working on them there was a clear laptop sound that we were doing. Once I saw that happening, I took all of Oli’s songs and put them into the same format. I went back to England to engineer it. After I sort of got all our ducks in a row, it became clear what we had. Oli came out and we recorded some stuff, and I stayed with Paul Hicks and kind of produced the whole thing from an album point of view. We worked on the consistency of the sound."

== Track listings ==
=== 2008 digital download ===
1. "So Vain" – 4:43
2. "Another John Doe" – 4:03
3. "Back to You" – 4:48
4. "Give You Love" – 4:25
5. "Bluesy" – 4:59
6. "Yomp" – 3:33
7. "Hiding Out" – 3:30
8. "Crazy Tuesday" – 3:52
9. "Idle Lover" – 4:50
10. "Shelter" – 5:54
11. "Wind Up Dead" – 5:06

2009 iTunes Bonus tracks (not available on UK iTunes store)

12. "Jokes On You" – 3:35
13. "You Gotta Wait" – 4:03

Both UK and US iTunes include a digital booklet

=== 2009 CD ===
1. "So Vain" – 4:43
2. "Back to You" – 4:48
3. "Give You Love" – 4:25
4. "Bluesy" – 4:59
5. "Yomp" – 3:33
6. "Hiding Out" – 3:30
7. "Crazy Tuesday" – 3:52
8. "Idle Lover" – 4:50
9. "Shelter" – 5:54
10. "Wind Up Dead" – 5:06
11. "People" – 5:28
12. "Another John Doe" – 4:03
13. "Jokes On You" – 3:35
14. "You Gotta Wait" – 4:03
15. "Life Off" – 5:08

== Personnel ==
Thenewno2

- Dhani Harrison – lead vocals, guitar, synthesizer, ukulele, bass, programming
- Oliver Hecks – synthesizers, drums, percussion, programming
- Nick Fyffe – bass

Additional musicians

- Josh Lopez – rhythm guitar on "Travelation"
- Marc Mann – acoustic guitars, music transcriptions
- Tom Hammons – cello
- Bryony Atkinson – backing vocals on "Wind Up Dead"
- Paul Hicks – programming

Production

- Paul Hicks – Engineer, Mixing
- Sean Magee – Mastering
- Tony Berg – Engineer
- Shawn Everett – Engineer
- Scott Seiver – Engineer

Artwork

- Drew Lorimer – Design
- Oliver Hecks & Robin Surtees – Photography
