= New Religion (film) =

2022 film directed by Keishi Kondo

- Film poster
- Japanese: ニューレリジョン
- Directed by: Keishi Kondo
- Written by: Keishi Kondo
- Starring: Kaho Seto
- Release dates: February 19, 2022 (Japan, preview); January 21, 2023 (Slamdance Film Festival)
- Running time: 100 minutes
- Country: Japan
- Language: Japanese

New Religion (Japanese: ニューレリジョン, Hepburn: Nyū Rerijon) is a 2022 Japanese psychological horror film written and directed by Keishi Kondo (in his feature directing debut).

== Premise ==
Miyabi is a sex worker who is mourning the accidental death of her young daughter. A new client of hers is a mysterious man who wants to photograph her body one part at a time.

== Cast ==
- Kaho Seto as Miyabi
- Satoshi Oka as Oka
- Saionji Ryuseigun as The Boyfriend
- Daiki Nunami as Aizawa
- Hanna Nakamoto as Aoi
- Yuki Nagata as Ex-Husband

== Release ==
New Religion was released in Japan on February 19, 2022 and in the United States in 2023 as part of the Slamdance Film Festival.

== Reception ==
On the review aggregator website Rotten Tomatoes, 89% of 9 critics' reviews are positive. Grant Watson, writing for fictionmachine.com, gave the film a highly positive review, saying that it "represents a potentially major new entry onto the J-horror landscape, and something a lot more exciting than yet another moribund retread or sequel." Ard Vijn of ScreenAnarchy called the film "visually interesting" and "a grim look at coping with loss and grief." In a slightly less positive review, James Hadfield of The Japan Times said that he "admired the boldness of Kondo’s aesthetic and the loftiness of his concepts", but that he also found the film "ponderous" and "wearying".
