= Not Alone Any More =

Song by the Traveling Wilburys

from the album Traveling Wilburys Vol. 1
- Released: 18 October 1988
- Recorded: May–June 1988
- Genre: Rock
- Length: 3:24
- Label: Wilbury
- Songwriter: Traveling Wilburys
- Producers: Otis Wilbury, Nelson Wilbury

"Not Alone Any More" is a song by the British–American supergroup the Traveling Wilburys from their 1988 album Traveling Wilburys Vol. 1. It was sung by Roy Orbison and serves as his main contribution to the album. The song was written mainly by Jeff Lynne, although all five members of the Wilburys are credited as songwriters.

A longtime admirer of Orbison, Lynne wrote "Not Alone Any More" as a vehicle for the singer's operatic vocal style. The song's lyrical theme of loneliness similarly recalls Orbison's dark ballads of the early 1960s. On release, the song was much admired by music critics. With the commercial success of the Wilburys, and the recognition afforded Orbison following his death in December 1988, it marked his full return from the career downturn he had experienced since the mid-1960s.

== Background ==
It was just a thrill, really, to write a song with Roy Orbison. It was an ambition that I'd always had and it came true, which was great.

— Jeff Lynne, 1990

George Harrison and Jeff Lynne first discussed the idea for the Traveling Wilburys in early 1987 when they were recording Harrison's album Cloud Nine. Lynne chose Roy Orbison as a potential bandmate, while Harrison's first choice was Bob Dylan. Later that year, Lynne began working in Los Angeles on Orbison's album Mystery Girl. As a result of this collaboration, Orbison, whom Harrison had befriended during a 1963 Beatles tour, joined Harrison, Lynne, Dylan and Tom Petty at the April 1988 recording session for "Handle with Care". The latter was intended as a B-side for Harrison's next single but instead led to the formation of the Wilburys and the decision to record an album together. Mo Ostin, the record company executive who encouraged Harrison to form the group, later said that, while there was mutual admiration among all the participants, "Roy Orbison was somebody they all idolized ... it was Roy who gave the project that special glow from rock 'n' roll's early formative years."

The band allocated ten days for writing and initial recording of the remaining songs for the album, due to the restrictions imposed by Dylan preparing to relaunch his live act and by Orbison's touring schedule. (Note: Dylan's tour, beginning on 18 June, became the start of his Never Ending Tour. Orbison said he rued having to depart for his US concerts and "couldn't wait to get back" and complete the Wilburys' album.) The songs were written quickly, with all the members as creative equals, and often working from an initial idea by one member. Lynne recalled that the writing and recording of each song was completed in a single day, which would usually end with Orbison regaling his bandmates with stories about Elvis Presley and Sun Records, where Orbison had begun his recording career in 1956. Although he contributed the least as a writer, Orbison described the collaborative process as one in which "there was no ego involved ... everyone would be throwing something in here and something in there." His principal contribution as a singer was on "Not Alone Any More".

Harrison said that they had considerable difficulty writing a song that suited Orbison, given that his best songs from the 1960s contained unusual elements in their composition and structure. Initially, "Not Alone Any More" was "simple beyond belief", according to Lynne, and had just three chords. In its completed form, the song was written mainly by Lynne. Petty recalled in 2012: "['Not Alone Any More'] was really Jeff and Roy's song. I mean, we all contributed a little bit, but in the end, they had the handle on that one ... the rest of us kind of backed off and let them go."

== Composition and lyrics ==
The composition is in the key of D major, with its verses using a chord pattern comprising D, B minor, F♯ minor, G and A. In the four-bar instrumental passage that opens the song, however, which is then repeated as a link between the first two verses, the D chord is followed by a change to C. The time signature throughout is 4/4, played to a moderate beat.

The lyrics evoke the forlorn romantic style typical of Orbison's work. According to Orbison biographer Ellis Amburn: "['Not Alone Any More'] is a variation on the theme of his old songs, such as 'Blue Angel'. A sensitive lover offers a woman sympathy for her heartbreak and suffering, thinking that this will make her love him. She, however, has found herself another man, and she's no longer in need of a shoulder to cry on." In music critic Jim Beviglia's interpretation:

The lyrics are straightforward and simple, the tale of a guy whose negligence cost him true love and whose ignorance won't let him believe she might ever find someone new until it's too late. The song is framed around his remembrances of her former predictions, every one of which comes true in the worst possible way for him. 'You always said that I'd be back again,' he begins. 'That I'd come running to you in the end.' And then: 'You always said that I would know someday / Just how it feels when your love walks away.' Yet even when he admits his part in her leaving, he can't comprehend that she's gone: 'I let you down, I let you go / I lost you, how was I to know.' When the narrator admits, 'I never could see past yesterday,' in the final verse, he is at least finally seeing the error of his ways, although that can provide him no consolation.

== Recording ==
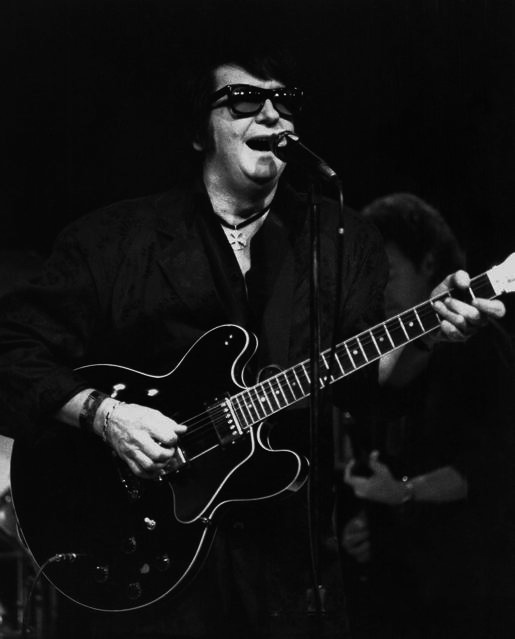
Orbison performing in New York in 1987

The Traveling Wilburys recorded the basic track for "Not Alone Any More" between 7 and 16 May 1988 at a makeshift studio in David A. Stewart's house in Los Angeles. Set up in the kitchen, the five band members typically played acoustic guitars, accompanied by a drum machine. Orbison recorded his vocal in a room in the house allocated for the band's vocals. The group were in awe of Orbison's prowess as a singer. Lynne recalled of the sessions: "Everybody just sat there going, 'Wow, it's Roy Orbison!'... Even though he's become your pal and you're hanging out and having a laugh and going to dinner, as soon as he gets behind that [mic] and he's doing his business, suddenly it's shudder time." Lynne biographer John Van der Kiste describes "Not Alone Any More" as a "soaring ballad" and "a perfect showcase for Roy's unmistakable vocal".

As the group's producers, Harrison and Lynne completed the album during the second round of sessions, held at Harrison's Friar Park studio in Henley in England. Up to this time, the two of them, and Petty also, were unimpressed with the track; Lynne said "it was driving me nuts 'cause it wasn't really doing Roy justice." (Note: Petty recalled that "No one was really happy with it" and they were considering writing a new song for Orbison.) According to Lynne, he returned to the studio one night, accompanied by Harrison's engineer, Richard Dodd, and overdubbed new guitar chords played on a Fender Telecaster. In the process, Lynne removed the previously recorded guitar parts, leaving just Orbison's vocal and the drum backing. He later said that while the melody remained unchanged, "suddenly the tune jumped into life and Roy's singing had much more meaning to it." When the others arrived, "[they] heard it as this new thing – as the same tune with different chords – and they all loved it." (Note: Lynne denied that he rewrote the song. He told disc jockey Roger Scott in early 1989: "It was everybody's song ... I didn't really [re]write the tune, I just changed the chords ... the whole chords under his voice. Left his tune the same.")

According to the recording notes, Lynne added guitar, bass guitar and a backing vocal on 23 May, and tom-toms were overdubbed during a session with drummer Jim Keltner on 16 June. (Note: Final recording and mixing for Mystery Girl was also carried out at Friar Park. Along with Petty's Full Moon Fever and Lynne's Armchair Theatre, Orbison's album was one of several projects to feature multiple members of the Wilburys.) In author Alan Clayson's description, the production represented a "do-it-yourself" version of Orbison hits such as "Running Scared" and "It's Over", from the singer's years as a Monument Records artist in the early 1960s. (Note: Orbison's most successful period, this also included "Only the Lonely" and "Crying" among chart hits that, in Rolling Stone's description, established his "brooding-loner persona".) Clayson says that, whereas those earlier recordings featured dramatic orchestral arrangements and "wailing chorale", the effect was achieved on "Not Alone Any More" through the inclusion of "chugging guitars, Jeff's one-finger, crash-diving fairground organ, some staccato sha-la-la-las and a secondary riff of unison piano and guitar". Beviglia also comments on the effectiveness of an arrangement that features "a churning rhythm section, [Lynne] and Harrison's aching backing vocals, and a downward spiraling synthesizer riff that mirrors the crash and burn of the protagonist", saying that it "leaves enough space for Orbison to work his melancholy magic". Beviglia concludes of Orbison's performance on the song: "As he repeats the closing word 'anymore', drums come crashing down around him, just as the narrator's word crumbles at his feet. But Orbison keeps going higher and higher, projecting infinite sorrow and anguish."

== Release and reception ==
I put everything I had into the project. But the other guys had visions of what I should sound like or what I should sing, and things like that, so we didn't question each other – we just went right ahead.

— Roy Orbison, 1988

Traveling Wilburys Vol. 1 was released on 18 October 1988 with "Not Alone Any More" sequenced as the final track on side one of the LP and cassette. Keen to maintain the group identity, the songs were credited to all five band members, although the allocation of each composition's publishing rights reflected its principal composer. In the case of "Not Alone Any More", the song was assigned to Lynne's publishing company, Shard End Music. When promoting the album, the band furthered the Wilburys' fictional history created by Derek Taylor, and adapted into a liner note essay by Michael Palin, whereby they were a band of musician brothers, the five sons of the philandering Charles Truscott Wilbury. Orbison adopted the pseudonym Lefty Wilbury in honour of his musical hero Lefty Frizzell. He said in one interview: "Some people say Daddy was a cad and a bounder, but I remember him as a Baptist minister."

The album was a commercial and critical success, and confirmed Orbison's comeback from relative obscurity since the mid-1960s. Author Peter Lehman describes Orbison's inclusion in a band with Dylan and Harrison as arguably the "turning point" in his return to mainstream popularity. In a contemporary review for Rolling Stone, David Wild described "Not Alone Any More" as "Totally boss" and added: "[The song] is a gorgeous pop ballad on which Roy Orbison – assisted by some wonderful backing vocals from Harrison and Lynne – hurts as good as he ever has. It proves that Orbison has lost none of his tremendous vocal prowess, and makes one eager to hear Orbison's upcoming solo album."

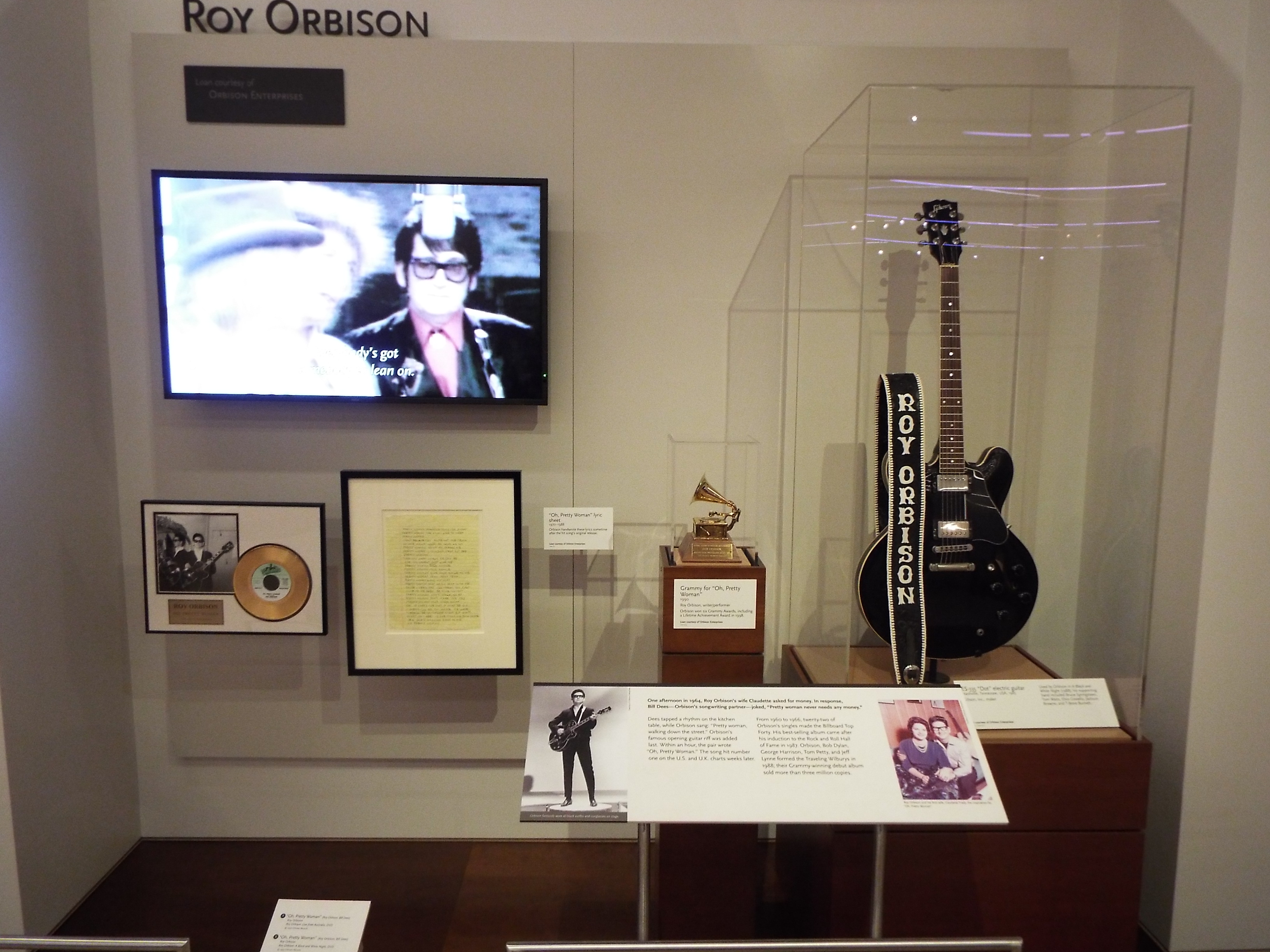
An exhibit dedicated to Orbison in the Musical Instrument Museum in Phoenix. A popular choice on US radio, "Not Alone Any More" served as Orbison's final song before his death in December 1988.

Petty recalled that Orbison was delighted with Vol. 1's reception, particularly following the news that it had been certified platinum for US sales of 1 million. Orbison's death on 6 December, from a heart attack, created further interest in the Wilburys' album. The release of Mystery Girl, led by the single "You Got It", an Orbison–Lynne–Petty collaboration, followed in January 1989 and became Orbison's most successful album.

"Not Alone Any More" received heavy rotation on US radio, although it was not issued as a single. Writing in 2002, music critic Greg Kot described the song as "a prototypical Orbison ballad" and a highlight of an album that "serves as a fitting final showcase for rock legend Orbison". In Rolling Stone's "100 Best Albums of the Eighties" feature, the magazine's editors said: "The five half-brothers of the Wilbury family were hokey but hip, and their individual strengths complemented one another perfectly. There was Orbison (Lefty Wilbury), whose haunting, dynamic vocals are enshrined on the operatic 'Not Alone Any More,' and who reclaimed his former glory only to pass away shortly after the album became a huge hit."

Having been out of print since 1996, Vol. 1 was reissued as part of the 2007 box set The Traveling Wilburys Collection, the vinyl release of which included alternate vocal takes of "Not Alone Any More". Reviewing the box set for Uncut that year, Bud Scoppa described the song as Orbison's "last rock aria" and a performance in which he "absolutely blows the roof off". In his article on the song for American Songwriter in October 2015, Jim Beviglia wrote that Orbison's voice was "perhaps the [Wilburys'] ultimate secret weapon" and the collaboration only fully succeeded through Lynne creating "a stratospheric weeper on the level of Orbison classics like 'Crying' and 'It's Over'". Beviglia concluded by saying that when Orbison died at the age of 52, "he went out at the peak of his powers with 'Not Alone Anymore'" and his legacy remains "greatly [enhanced] by this tear-stained triumph".

Jeff Burger, writing for The Morton Report in 2016, highlighted the song and "Handle with Care" as Vol. 1's fun-filled "ear candy" that "profit from Orbison's inimitable soaring vocals, Harrison's trademark guitar, and Lynne's production". Petty credited Lynne with making Orbison "feel comfortable with recording again" through their collaborations on Traveling Wilburys Vol. 1 and Mystery Girl, and in doing so, he "completely revitalised [Orbison's] career". Petty said of "Not Alone Any More": "[Lynne] completely re-wrote the song around this lead vocal that was down there. And wrote this incredible song, you know, and it's now one of my favorite ones on the album. And there's nobody [else] that could do that."

In September 2016, Legacy Recordings included both "Handle with Care" and "Not Alone Any More" on its Orbison compilation album The Ultimate Collection. Guitarist Adrian Belew covered "Not Alone Any More" on his 1990 album Young Lions. In 2009, Lucy Walsh contributed a recording of the song to the Orbison tribute album Under the Covers.

== Sources ==
- Amburn, Ellis (1990). Dark Star: The Roy Orbison Story. New York, NY: Carol Publishing Group. ISBN 0-8184-0518-X.
- Badman, Keith (2001). The Beatles Diary Volume 2: After the Break-Up 1970–2001. London: Omnibus Press. ISBN 978-0-7119-8307-6.
- Clayson, Alan (1989). Only the Lonely: Roy Orbison's Life and Legacy. London: St. Martin's Press. ISBN 0-312-03961-1.
- Clayson, Alan (2003). George Harrison. London: Sanctuary. ISBN 1-86074-489-3.
- The Editors of Rolling Stone (2002). Harrison. New York, NY: Rolling Stone Press. ISBN 978-0-7432-3581-5.
- Guttenbacher, Patrik; Haines, Marc; von Petersdorff, Alexander (1996). Unexpected Messages: The Story of The Electric Light Orchestra, The Move, Jeff Lynne, Roy Wood, Bev Bevan. FTM. ISBN 9783000006425.
- Heylin, Clinton (2011). Bob Dylan: Behind the Shades (20th Anniversary ed.). London: Faber and Faber. ISBN 978-0-571-27240-2.
- Huntley, Elliot J. (2006). Mystical One: George Harrison – After the Break-up of the Beatles. Toronto, ON: Guernica Editions. ISBN 1-55071-197-0.
- Larkin, Colin, ed. (2011). The Encyclopedia of Popular Music (5th edn). London: Omnibus Press. ISBN 978-0-85712-595-8.
- Lehman, Peter (2010). Roy Orbison: The Invention of an Alternative Rock Masculinity. Philadelphia, PA: Temple University Press. ISBN 978-1-439903896.
- Madinger, Chip; Easter, Mark (2000). Eight Arms to Hold You: The Solo Beatles Compendium. Chesterfield, MO: 44.1 Productions. ISBN 0-615-11724-4.
- Romanowski, Patricia; George-Warren, Holly, eds. (1995). The New Rolling Stone Encyclopedia of Rock & Roll. New York, NY: Fireside/Rolling Stone Press. ISBN 0-684-81044-1.
- Smax, Willy (dir.) (2007). The True History of the Traveling Wilburys (DVD). Traveling Wilburys; Willy Smax and Olivia Harrison (producers). Wilbury Record Co.
- Sounes, Howard (2001). Down the Highway: The Life of Bob Dylan. London: Doubleday. ISBN 0-385-60125-5.
- Traveling Wilburys (2009). The Traveling Wilburys. Guildford, UK: Genesis Publications. ISBN 978-1-905662159.
- Van der Kiste, John (2015). Jeff Lynne: The Electric Light Orchestra, Before and After. Stroud, UK: Fonthill Media. ISBN 978-1-78155-492-0.
- Zanes, Warren, ed. (2007). Tom Petty and the Heartbreakers: Runnin' Down a Dream. San Francisco, CA: Chronicle Books. ISBN 978-0-8118-6201-1.
- Zollo, Paul (2005). Conversations with Tom Petty. New York, NY: Omnibus Press. ISBN 1-84449-815-8.
