= Innerstanding (Dhani Harrison album) =

Studio album by Dhani Harrison
- Released: 20 October 2023
- Length: 54:01
- Label: BMG Rights Management
- Producer: Dhani Harrison

Dhani Harrison chronology
| In Parallel (2017) | Innerstanding (2023) |

Innerstanding is the second solo studio album by English musician Dhani Harrison, released on 20 October 2023 through BMG Rights Management. The album is Harrison's first in six years, following 2017's In Parallel, and includes collaborations with Graham Coxon, Mereki, and Liela Moss from The Duke Spirit. It received positive reviews from critics.

== Critical reception ==
Professional ratings
Aggregate scores
| Source | Rating |
|---|---|
| Metacritic | 71/100 |
Review scores
| Source | Rating |
| AllMusic | 3.5/5 stars |
| Classic Rock | 3.5/5 stars |
| Mojo | 4/5 stars |
| Uncut | 6/10 |

Innerstanding received a score of 71 out of 100 on review aggregator Metacritic based on five critics' reviews, indicating "generally favorable" reception. Stephen Thomas Erlewine of AllMusic called it "an ever-shifting, meditative record occupying a space somewhere between close listening and ambience. Despite its reliance on mood, this is not instrumental music, nor is it all hushed". Mojo felt that "Innerstanding finds Harrison marking out his own territory, sustaining a brooding musical atmosphere and filling it with sterling melodies", and Classic Rock opined that it "maintains In//Parallel's intrinsic style and pan-genre forward momentum, a seamless, pop-literate/prog-friendly fusion positively peppered with an abundance of barbed hooks". Uncut found that "it's only on the lengthy, ambient, vaporous 'La Sirena' and the pretty, dramatic ballad 'ICU' that everything gels together".

== Track listing ==
Innerstanding track listing
| No. | Title | Length |
|---|---|---|
| 1. | "Dangerous Lies" | 5:07 |
| 2. | "New Religion" (featuring Graham Coxon) | 3:57 |
| 3. | "Ahoy There!" (featuring Liela Moss) | 6:36 |
| 4. | "La Sirena" | 5:20 |
| 5. | "Damn That Frequency" | 5:15 |
| 6. | "The Dancing Tree" (featuring Mereki) | 6:17 |
| 7. | "Right Side of History" | 5:17 |
| 8. | "Ghost Garden" | 5:48 |
| 9. | "I.C.U." | 3:54 |
| 10. | "Wolves Around the City" (featuring Mereki) | 8:30 |
| Total length: | | 54:01 |

== Charts ==
Chart performance for Innerstanding
| Chart (2024) | Peak position |
|---|---|
| Scottish Albums (OCC) | 51 |
| UK Independent Albums (OCC) | 20 |
