= Paul Hicks (musician) =

British musician, engineer and mixer

Paul Hicks is a British musician, audio engineer and mixer, who got his start working at Abbey Road Studios in London. Hicks has worked with artists including Coldplay, Elliott Smith, Paul McCartney and Ringo Starr, in addition to his own band thenewno2 with Dhani Harrison. Hicks has also been heavily involved in preserving the recordings of the Beatles, working with Giles Martin in remixing and remastering their entire catalogue. He has won three Grammy Awards for his work on Beatles projects. His father is Hollies guitarist Tony Hicks. Hicks has also worked on former Beatle George Harrison's posthumous releases, including the music for Martin Scorsese's 2011 documentary film George Harrison: Living in the Material World.

In 2013, Hicks, along with his working partner Dhani Harrison, scored the film Beautiful Creatures. In 2014, they scored the film, Learning to Drive, as well as the AMC TV series The Divide. Hicks and Harrison have gone on to score the music for the TV show Good Girls Revolt, the motion picture Seattle Road, and for the Paul Giamatti-produced show, Outsiders. In 2018, Hicks and Harrison received a nomination for 'Best Music Score' at the International Documentary Association Awards for their work on the Sundance Film Festival Award-winning documentary, Matangi/Maya/M.I.A.. Together with Harrison, Hicks has also written the original theme for the Netflix produced documentary show Dogs, scored the four-part HBO documentary series The Case Against Adnan Syed and the 2019 Bill Gates Netflix docuseries Inside Bill's Brain: Decoding Bill Gates.
