= The Traveling Wilburys Collection =

2007 box set by the Traveling Wilburys

Box set by Traveling Wilburys
- Released: 11 June 2007
- Recorded: 1988–1990 (plus overdubs in 2007)
- Genre: Folk rock, rock
- Length: 1:26:46 (2 CD/1 DVD)
- Label: Wilbury Record Co. Rhino Entertainment
- Producer: Nelson Wilbury; Otis Wilbury; Spike Wilbury; Clayton Wilbury

Traveling Wilburys chronology
Traveling Wilburys Vol. 3 (1990)	The Traveling Wilburys Collection (2007)

Professional ratings
Review scores
Source	Rating
All About Jazz	4/5 stars
AllMusic	4/5 stars
The Austin Chronicle	4/5 stars
The A.V. Club	B+
Entertainment Weekly	A−
Mojo	4/5 stars
Pioneer Press	4/5 stars
PopMatters	9/10 stars
Record Collector	4/5 stars
Uncut	5/5 stars

The Traveling Wilburys Collection is a box set compilation album by the British-American supergroup the Traveling Wilburys. It comprises the two studio albums recorded by the band in 1988 and 1990, with additional bonus tracks, and a DVD containing their music videos and a documentary about the group. The box set was released on 11 June 2007 by Rhino, in association with Wilbury Records.

The release was overseen by George Harrison's estate, as the rights holder for the Wilburys' catalogue, and ensured that the band's recordings were available for the first time since they went out of print in the mid 1990s. Two of the bonus tracks were completed for the box set by Jeff Lynne, who co-founded the Wilburys in 1988, and Harrison's son Dhani. The Traveling Wilburys Collection was commercially successful, topping albums charts in Britain, Ireland, Australia and several other countries.

== Track listings ==
=== Disc one: Traveling Wilburys Vol. 1 ===
All songs written by the Traveling Wilburys.

1. "Handle with Care" – 3:20
2. "Dirty World" – 3:30
3. "Rattled" – 3:00
4. "Last Night" – 3:48
5. "Not Alone Any More" – 3:24
6. "Congratulations" – 3:30
7. "Heading for the Light" – 3:37
8. "Margarita" – 3:15
9. "Tweeter and the Monkey Man" – 5:30
10. "End of the Line" – 3:30
11. "Maxine" – 2:49
  - Previously unreleased bonus track, with additional backing vocals by Jeff Lynne and Dhani Harrison and a guitar solo by Jeff Lynne added in 2007.
12. "Like a Ship" – 3:30
  - Previously unreleased bonus track, with additional backing vocals by Jeff Lynne and Dhani Harrison and a guitar solo by Dhani Harrison added in 2007.

=== Disc two: DVD ===
1. The True History of the Traveling Wilburys documentary (24 minutes)
2. "Handle with Care" (video)
3. "End of the Line" (video)
4. "She's My Baby" (video)
5. "Inside Out" (video)
6. "Wilbury Twist" (video)

=== Disc three: Traveling Wilburys Vol. 3 ===
All songs written by the Traveling Wilburys, except where noted.

1. "She's My Baby" – 3:14
2. "Inside Out" – 3:36
3. "If You Belonged to Me" – 3:13
4. "The Devil's Been Busy" – 3:18
5. "7 Deadly Sins" – 3:18
6. "Poor House" – 3:17
7. "Where Were You Last Night?" – 3:03
8. "Cool Dry Place" – 3:37
9. "New Blue Moon" – 3:21
10. "You Took My Breath Away" – 3:18
11. "Wilbury Twist" – 2:56
12. "Nobody's Child" (Cy Coben, Mel Foree) – 3:28
  - Bonus track, previously released on Nobody's Child: Romanian Angel Appeal.
13. "Runaway" (Del Shannon, Max D. Crook) – 2:30
  - Bonus track, originally released as the B-side to "She's My Baby" in the UK. Remixed, with a new clavioline solo replacing the original guitar/harmonica tracks recorded in 1990.

=== Vinyl edition track listings ===
The Vinyl Edition features the originally released Vol. 1 and Vol. 3 plus a bonus 12″ featuring:

Side one

1. "Handle with Care (Extended Version)"
2. "Like a Ship"
3. "Maxine"

Side two

1. "End of the Line (Extended Version)"
2. "Nobody's Child"
3. "Not Alone Any More (Remix)"
4. "Runaway"

== Formats ==
The set is available in four different configurations:

- The standard package features both albums with bonus tracks, a bonus DVD with a 24-minute documentary and the music videos produced by the band, and a 16-page collectible book.
- The deluxe edition set is linen-bound and features both albums with bonus tracks, the bonus DVD, and a 40-page collectible book with photos, original liner notes, and new liner notes. The deluxe edition is limited to 50,000 copies worldwide and includes a uniquely numbered certificate of authenticity.
- A vinyl edition features both albums on vinyl with an additional 12-inch disc featuring bonus tracks, a collectible album-sized book, additional postcards and posters, and an exclusive remix of "Not Alone Any More".
- A digital bundle was also released and features downloadable editions of the albums with bonus tracks, video content and an interactive booklet.

== Personnel ==
Traveling Wilburys

- Nelson/Spike Wilbury (George Harrison) – lead and rhythm guitars, mandolin, sitar, vocals
- Clayton/Otis Wilbury (Jeff Lynne) – guitar, keyboards, bass, vocals, lead guitar on "Maxine", drums and cowbell on "Handle with Care"
- Charlie/Muddy Wilbury (Tom Petty) – guitar, vocals
- Lucky/Boo Wilbury (Bob Dylan) – guitar, harmonica, vocals
- Lefty Wilbury (Roy Orbison; 1988 recordings only) – guitar, vocals

Additional musicians

- Buster Sidebury (Jim Keltner) – drums, percussion
- Jim Horn – saxophones
- Ray Cooper – percussion
- Ian Wallace – tom-toms on "Handle with Care"
- Ken Wilbury (Gary Moore) – lead guitar on "She's My Baby"
- Ayrton Wilbury (Dhani Harrison; 2007 overdubs) – lead guitar on "Like a Ship", backing vocals on "Maxine" and "Like a Ship"

== Charts ==
Though the original issues enjoyed success, this re-release reached even greater heights, quickly topping the UK Albums Chart, the Australian ARIA Charts, Ireland's Albums Chart, New Zealand's Albums Chart, Apple's iTunes, and Amazon's pre-order and sales list. In the United States, the set debuted and peaked at number 9 on Billboard's Billboard 200 album chart, beating the record held by Nirvana's With the Lights Out for the highest debut of a box set, although Nirvana's sold more copies (119,000). It remained on the Billboard 200 for 13 weeks. The album also set the biggest first week UK sales for a box set. Over 1,827,000 copies have been sold worldwide to date.

=== Weekly charts ===
Chart (2007)	Peak position
Australian Albums (ARIA)	1
Austrian Albums (Ö3 Austria)	24
Belgian Albums (Ultratop Flanders)	31
Belgian Albums (Ultratop Wallonia)	70
Canadian Albums (Billboard)	4
Dutch Albums (Album Top 100)	13
Danish Albums (Hitlisten)	1
French Albums (SNEP)	116
German Albums (Offizielle Top 100)	9
Irish Albums (IRMA)	1
Italian Albums (FIMI)	30
New Zealand Albums (RMNZ)	1
Norwegian Albums (VG-lista)	1
Scottish Albums (OCC)	1
Spanish Albums (Promusicae)	9
Swedish Albums (Sverigetopplistan)	2
Swiss Albums (Schweizer Hitparade)	45
UK Albums (OCC)	1
US Billboard 200	9

=== Year-end charts ===
Chart (2007)	Position
Australian Albums (ARIA)	17
New Zealand Albums (RMNZ)	11
Swedish Albums (Sverigetopplistan)	48
UK Albums (OCC)	28

== Certifications ==
Region	Certification	Certified units/sales
Australia (ARIA)	2× Platinum	140,000^{^}
Canada (Music Canada)	Platinum	100,000^{^}
Denmark (IFPI Danmark)	Gold	15,000^{^}
Ireland (IRMA)	2× Platinum	30,000^{^}
New Zealand (RMNZ)	Platinum	15,000^{^}
Sweden (GLF)	Gold	20,000^{^}
United Kingdom (BPI)	Platinum	300,000^{^}
United States (RIAA)	Gold	500,000^{^}
^{^} Shipments figures based on certification alone.
