= Giants Stadium 1987, 1989, 1991 =

Live album and box set by Grateful Dead
- Released: September 27, 2019
- Recorded: July 12, 1987; July 9 – 10, 1989; June 16 – 17, 1991
- Venues: Giants Stadium; East Rutherford, New Jersey
- Genre: Rock
- Label: Rhino
- Producer: Grateful Dead

Grateful Dead chronology
Dave's Picks Volume 31 (2019)	Giants Stadium 1987, 1989, 1991 (2019)	Saint of Circumstance (2019)

Grateful Dead concert box set chronology
Pacific Northwest '73–'74: The Complete Recordings (2018)	Giants Stadium 1987, 1989, 1991 (2019)	June 1976 (2020)

Giants Stadium 1987, 1989, 1991 is a live box set by the rock band the Grateful Dead. It contains five complete concerts on 14 CDs. The shows were recorded at Giants Stadium in East Rutherford, New Jersey on July 12, 1987, July 9 and 10, 1989, and June 16 and 17, 1991. The album also includes a video of the June 17, 1991 performance, on two DVDs or one Blu-ray disc. It was released on September 27, 2019, in a limited edition of 10,000 numbered copies.

The June 17, 1991 concert was also released as a separate album called Saint of Circumstance, on three CDs or five LPs.

The video of the June 17, 1991 concert was shown in theaters on August 1, 2019, as that year's Grateful Dead Meet-Up at the Movies.

Giants Stadium 1987, 1989, 1991 was nominated for a Grammy Award for Best Boxed or Special Limited Edition Package.

== The Giants Stadium concerts ==
The July 12, 1987 concert was part of the Bob Dylan and the Grateful Dead 1987 Tour. The two sets of music by the Grateful Dead included in Giants Stadium 1987, 1989, 1991 were followed at that show by one set by Bob Dylan, performing with the Dead as his backup band. Dylan & the Dead is a live album recorded on that tour.

At the 1989 concerts the opening act was Los Lobos. At the 1991 concerts the opening act was Little Feat.

From 1978 to 1995 the Grateful Dead performed a total of 14 concerts at Giants Stadium.

== Track listing ==
=== July 12, 1987 ===
Disc 1

First set:

1. "Hell in a Bucket" (Bob Weir, Brent Mydland, John Perry Barlow) – 6:25
2. "West L.A. Fadeaway" (Jerry Garcia, Robert Hunter) – 8:11
3. "Greatest Story Ever Told" (Weir, Mickey Hart, Hunter) – 4:24
4. "Loser" (Garcia, Hunter) – 6:46
5. "Tons of Steel" (Mydland) – 6:24
6. "Ramble On Rose" (Garcia, Hunter) – 6:55
7. "When I Paint My Masterpiece" (Bob Dylan) – 4:55
8. "When Push Comes to Shove" (Garcia, Hunter) – 5:07
9. "Promised Land" (Chuck Berry) – 3:54
10. "Bertha" (Garcia, Hunter) – 7:01

Disc 2

Second set:

1. "Morning Dew" (Bonnie Dobson, Tim Rose) – 10:08
2. "Playing in the Band" > (Weir, Hart, Hunter) – 9:12
3. "Drums" > (Hart, Bill Kreutzmann) – 7:14
4. "Space" > (Garcia, Phil Lesh, Weir) – 3:22
5. "The Other One" > (Weir, Kreutzmann) – 6:28
6. "Stella Blue" > (Garcia, Hunter) – 7:34
7. "Throwing Stones" > (Weir, Barlow) – 9:11
8. "Not Fade Away" (Buddy Holly, Norman Petty) – 9:08

=== July 9, 1989 ===
Disc 3

First set:

1. "Shakedown Street" (Garcia, Hunter) – 13:31 (Note: "Addams Family" tuning before "Shakedown Street")
2. "Jack Straw" (Weir, Hunter) – 5:49
3. "West L.A. Fadeaway" (Garcia, Hunter) – 8:26
4. "Victim or the Crime" (Weir, Gerrit Graham) – 7:55
5. "Brown-Eyed Women" (Garcia, Hunter) – 5:56
6. "Queen Jane Approximately" (Dylan) – 6:46
7. "Bird Song" (Garcia, Hunter) – 11:42

Disc 4

Second set:

1. "China Cat Sunflower" > (Garcia, Hunter) – 6:58
2. "I Know You Rider" (traditional, arranged by Grateful Dead) – 6:10
3. "Samson and Delilah" (traditional, arranged by Grateful Dead) – 7:28
4. "Built to Last" (Garcia, Hunter) – 5:29
5. "Truckin'" > (Garcia, Lesh, Weir, Hunter) – 10:55
6. "Drums" (Hart, Kreutzmann) – 10:00

Disc 5

1. "Space" > (Garcia, Lesh, Weir) – 10:06
2. "Gimme Some Lovin'" > (Steve Winwood, Spencer Davis, Muff Winwood) – 5:15
3. "Goin' Down the Road Feeling Bad" > (traditional, arranged by Grateful Dead) – 6:33
4. "Throwing Stones" > (Weir, Barlow) – 10:12
5. "Not Fade Away" (Holly, Petty) – 13:38

Encore:

6. "Brokedown Palace" (Garcia, Hunter) – 5:53

=== July 10, 1989 ===
Disc 6

First set:

1. "Feel Like a Stranger" > (Weir, Barlow) – 8:20 (Note: "Mexican Hat Dance" tuning before "Feel Like a Stranger")
2. "Franklin's Tower" (Garcia, Kreutzmann, Hunter) – 9:13
3. "Walkin' Blues" (Robert Johnson, arranged by Weir) – 7:08
4. "Jack-a-Roe" (traditional, arranged by Grateful Dead) – 4:50
5. "When I Paint My Masterpiece" (Dylan) – 6:59
6. "Tennessee Jed" (Garcia, Hunter) – 8:28
7. "The Music Never Stopped" > (Weir, Barlow) – 6:19
8. "Don't Ease Me In" (traditional, arranged by Grateful Dead) – 3:42

Disc 7

Second set:

1. "Foolish Heart" (Garcia, Hunter) – 11:01
2. "Just a Little Light" (Mydland, Barlow) – 5:16
3. "Playing in the Band" > (Weir, Hart, Hunter) – 6:42
4. "Uncle John's Band" > (Garcia, Hunter) – 12:54
5. "Drums" (Hart, Kreutzmann) – 20:15

Disc 8

1. "Space" > (Garcia, Lesh, Weir) – 10:11
2. "Iko Iko" > (James Crawford) – 8:01 (Note: with The Neville Brothers)
3. "All Along the Watchtower" > (Dylan) – 5:41
4. "Morning Dew" (Dobson, Rose) – 10:43
5. "Sugar Magnolia" (Weir, Hunter) – 10:30

Encore:

6. "Knockin' on Heaven's Door" (Dylan) – 7:58

=== June 16, 1991 ===
Disc 9

First set:

1. "Picasso Moon" (Weir, Barlow, Bob Bralove) – 7:23
2. "Bertha" (Garcia, Hunter) – 7:29
3. "Little Red Rooster" (Willie Dixon) – 9:30
4. "Candyman" (Garcia, Hunter) – 7:33
5. "Stuck Inside of Mobile with the Memphis Blues Again" (Dylan) – 8:46
6. "Stagger Lee" (Garcia, Hunter) – 7:28
7. "Let It Grow" (Weir, Barlow) – 12:43

Disc 10

Second set:

1. "Jack Straw" (Weir, Hunter) – 7:25
2. "Crazy Fingers" (Garcia, Hunter) – 8:32
3. "China Cat Sunflower" > (Garcia, Hunter) – 7:05
4. "I Know You Rider" > (traditional, arranged by Grateful Dead) – 5:37
5. "Drums" (Hart, Kreutzmann) – 12:17

Disc 11

1. "Space" > (Garcia, Lesh, Weir) – 13:47
2. "I Need a Miracle" > (Weir, Barlow) – 6:35
3. "Black Peter" > (Garcia, Hunter) – 11:35
4. "Throwing Stones" > (Weir, Barlow) – 9:06
5. "Not Fade Away" (Holly, Petty) – 10:37

Encore:

6. "Box of Rain" (Lesh, Hunter) – 6:14

=== June 17, 1991 ===
Disc 12

First set:

1. "Eyes of the World" > (Garcia, Hunter) – 15:26
2. "Walkin' Blues" (Johnson, arranged by Weir) – 7:01
3. "Brown-Eyed Women" (Garcia, Hunter) – 6:10
4. "Dark Star" > (Garcia, Hart, Kreutzmann, Lesh, Ron McKernan, Weir, Hunter) – 1:32
5. "When I Paint My Masterpiece" (Dylan) – 5:28
6. "Loose Lucy" (Garcia, Hunter) – 9:16
7. "Cassidy" (Weir, Barlow) – 7:11
8. "Might as Well" (Garcia, Hunter) – 6:41

Disc 13

Second set:

1. "Saint of Circumstance" > (Weir, Barlow) – 10:55
2. "Ship of Fools" > (Garcia, Hunter) – 8:01
3. "Dark Star" > (Garcia, Hart, Kreutzmann, Lesh, McKernan, Weir, Hunter) – 1:14
4. "Truckin'" > (Garcia, Lesh, Weir, Hunter) – 6:55
5. "New Speedway Boogie" > (Garcia, Hunter) – 9:12
6. "Dark Star" > (Garcia, Hart, Kreutzmann, Lesh, McKernan, Weir, Hunter) – 0:55
7. "Uncle John's Band" > (Garcia, Hunter) – 11:18
8. "Dark Star" > (Garcia, Hart, Kreutzmann, Lesh, McKernan, Weir, Hunter) – 8:05
9. "Drums" (Hart, Kreutzmann) – 12:30

Disc 14

1. "Space" > (Garcia, Lesh, Weir) – 8:47
2. "China Doll" > (Garcia, Hunter) – 5:07
3. "Playing in the Band" > (Weir, Hart, Hunter) – 4:35
4. "Sugar Magnolia" (Weir, Hunter) – 10:53

Encore:

5. "The Weight" (Robbie Robertson) – 6:20

== Personnel ==
Grateful Dead

- Jerry Garcia – guitar, vocals
- Bob Weir – guitar, vocals
- Phil Lesh – bass, vocals
- Bill Kreutzmann – drums
- Mickey Hart – drums
- Brent Mydland – keyboards, vocals (1987, 1989)
- Vince Welnick – keyboards, vocals (1991)
- Bruce Hornsby – keyboards, vocals (1991)

Production

- Produced by Grateful Dead
- Produced for release by David Lemieux
- Associate Producers: Ivette Ramos
- Recording: John Cutler
- Mixing: Jeffrey Norman
- Mastering: David Glasser
- Art direction, design: Lisa Glines, Doran Tyson

== Dylan and the Dead – July 12, 1987 ==
At the July 12, 1987 concert, after the Grateful Dead played two sets of music, Bob Dylan performed a set of songs with the Dead as his backup band. This music is not included in Giants Stadium 1987, 1989, 1991. The song list was:

Third set:

- "Slow Train"
- "Stuck Inside of Mobile with the Memphis Blues Again"
- "Tomorrow Is a Long Time"
- "Highway 61 Revisited"
- "It's All Over Now, Baby Blue"
- "Ballad of a Thin Man"
- "John Brown"
- "The Wicked Messenger"
- "Queen Jane Approximately"
- "Chimes of Freedom"
- "Joey"
- "All Along the Watchtower"
- "The Times They Are a-Changin'"

Encore:

- "Touch of Grey"
- "Knockin' on Heaven's Door"

== Charts ==
Chart (2019)	Peak position
US Billboard 200	118
