= True Confessions Tour =

1986 concert tour by Bob Dylan and Tom Petty and the Heartbreakers

- Tour by Bob Dylan
- Poster to the concerts in New York, USA
- Location: Oceania; Asia; North America
- Start date: February 5, 1986
- End date: August 6, 1986
- Legs: 3
- No. of shows: 15 in Oceania; 4 in Asia; 41 in North America; 60 in total

Bob Dylan concert chronology
- 1984 European Tour (1984); True Confessions Tour (1986); Bob Dylan and the Grateful Dead 1987 Tour (1987)

The True Confessions Tour was a concert tour by Bob Dylan and Tom Petty and the Heartbreakers.

A concert video, Hard to Handle, filmed in Sydney, Australia on February 24 and 25 was directed by Gillian Armstrong. The HBO Special was released on Virgin Music VHS in 1986 and CBS/Fox Video laserdisc in 1988.

== Background ==
The tour started with two concerts in New Zealand and thirteen concerts in Australia before four concerts in Japan. Both Dylan and Petty took a break after this tour before returning to the road in June to perform a forty-one date tour of the United States and Canada. During the tour the pair performed two concerts at RFK Stadium in Washington, DC, three concerts at Madison Square Garden in New York City and two concerts at The Spectrum in Philadelphia. The tour came to a close on August 6 in Paso Robles, California. The pair would tour together the following year on the Temples in Flames Tour.

== Tour dates ==
| Date | City | Country | Venue | Tickets sold / available | Gross revenue |
|---|---|---|---|---|---|
Oceania
| February 5, 1986 | Wellington | New Zealand | Wellington Athletic Park | | |
| February 7, 1986 | Auckland | New Zealand | Mount Smart Stadium | | |
| February 10, 1986 | Sydney | Australia | Sydney Entertainment Centre | | |
| February 11, 1986 | Sydney | Australia | Sydney Entertainment Centre | | |
| February 12, 1986 | Sydney | Australia | Sydney Entertainment Centre | | |
| February 13, 1986 | Sydney | Australia | Sydney Entertainment Centre | | |
| February 15, 1986 | Adelaide | Australia | Memorial Drive Park | | |
| February 17, 1986 | Perth | Australia | Perth Entertainment Centre | | |
| February 18, 1986 | Perth | Australia | Perth Entertainment Centre | | |
| February 20, 1986 | Melbourne | Australia | Kooyong Stadium | | |
| February 21, 1986 | Melbourne | Australia | Kooyong Stadium | | |
| February 22, 1986 | Melbourne | Australia | Kooyong Stadium | | |
| February 24, 1986 | Sydney | Australia | Sydney Entertainment Centre | | |
| February 25, 1986 | Sydney | Australia | Sydney Entertainment Centre | | |
| March 1, 1986 | Brisbane | Australia | Lang Park | | |
Asia
| March 5, 1986 | Tokyo | Japan | Nippon Budokan | | |
| March 6, 1986 | Osaka | Japan | Osaka-jō Hall | | |
| March 8, 1986 | Nagoya | Japan | Aichi Prefectural Gymnasium | | |
| March 10, 1986 | Tokyo | Japan | Nippon Budokan | | |
North America
| June 9, 1986 | San Diego | United States | San Diego Sports Arena | | |
| June 11, 1986 | Reno | United States | Lawlor Events Center | 9,006 / 10,000 | $151,310 |
| June 12, 1986 | Sacramento | United States | Cal Expo Amphitheatre | 12,396 / 12,396 | $216,930 |
| June 13, 1986 | Berkeley | United States | Hearst Greek Theatre | 17,000 / 17,000 | $339,860 |
| June 14, 1986 | Berkeley | United States | Hearst Greek Theatre | 17,000 / 17,000 | $339,860 |
| June 16, 1986 | Costa Mesa | United States | Pacific Amphitheatre | 37,528 / 37,528 | $626,682 |
| June 17, 1986 | Costa Mesa | United States | Pacific Amphitheatre | 37,528 / 37,528 | $626,682 |
| June 18, 1986 | Phoenix | United States | Arizona Veterans Memorial Coliseum | 13,536 / 13,536 | $151,310 |
| June 20, 1986 | Houston | United States | Southern Star Amphitheater | | |
| June 21, 1986 | Austin | United States | Frank Erwin Center | 14,958 / 15,205 | $334,828 |
| June 22, 1986 | Dallas | United States | Reunion Arena | 14,342 / 18,000 | $224,255 |
| June 24, 1986 | Indianapolis | United States | Market Square Arena | 9,125 / 18,000 | $159,687 |
| June 26, 1986 | Minneapolis | United States | Hubert H. Humphrey Metrodome | 50,588 / 53,000 | $1,011,760 |
| June 27, 1986 | East Troy | United States | Alpine Valley Music Theatre | 23,184 / 23,184 | $288,152 |
| June 29, 1986 | Hoffman Estates | United States | Poplar Creek Music Theater | | |
| June 30, 1986 | Clarkston | United States | Pine Knob Music Theatre | | |
| July 1, 1986 | Clarkston | United States | Pine Knob Music Theatre | | |
| July 2, 1986 | Akron | United States | Rubber Bowl | 35,292 / 38,000 | $690,180 |
| July 4, 1986 | Orchard Park | United States | Rich Stadium | 63,850 / 75,000 | $1,277,000 |
| July 6, 1986 | Washington, D.C. | United States | Robert F. Kennedy Memorial Stadium | 108,235 / 130,000 | $2,132,700 |
| July 7, 1986 | Washington, D.C. | United States | Robert F. Kennedy Memorial Stadium | 108,235 / 130,000 | $2,132,700 |
| July 8, 1986 | Mansfield | United States | Great Woods Performing Arts Center | | |
| July 9, 1986 | Mansfield | United States | Great Woods Performing Arts Center | | |
| July 11, 1986 | Hartford | United States | Hartford Civic Center | 15,593 / 15,593 | $269,157 |
| July 13, 1986 | Saratoga Springs | United States | Saratoga Performing Arts Center | 19,290 / 25,000 | |
| July 15, 1986 | New York City | United States | Madison Square Garden | | |
| July 16, 1986 | New York City | United States | Madison Square Garden | | |
| July 17, 1986 | New York City | United States | Madison Square Garden | | |
| July 19, 1986 | Philadelphia | United States | The Spectrum | 37,301 / 37,301 | $585,478 |
| July 20, 1986 | Philadelphia | United States | The Spectrum | 37,301 / 37,301 | $585,478 |
| July 21, 1986 | East Rutherford | United States | Brendan Byrne Arena | 13,507 / 14,638 | $255,519 |
| July 22, 1986 | Mansfield | United States | Great Woods Performing Arts Center | | |
| July 24, 1986 | Bonner Springs | United States | Sandstone Amphitheater | | |
| July 26, 1986 | Morrison | United States | Red Rocks Amphitheatre | 17,668 / 17,668 | $379,943 |
| July 27, 1986 | Morrison | United States | Red Rocks Amphitheatre | 17,668 / 17,668 | $379,943 |
| July 29, 1986 | Portland | United States | Civic Stadium | 18,540 / 18,540 | $334,828 |
| July 31, 1986 | Tacoma | United States | Tacoma Dome | | |
| August 1, 1986 | Vancouver | Canada | BC Place Stadium | 23,164 / 28,000 | $378,017 |
| August 3, 1986 | Inglewood | United States | The Forum | | |
| August 5, 1986 | Mountain View | United States | Shoreline Amphitheatre | | |
| August 6, 1986 | Paso Robles | United States | Paso Robles Mid-State Fairground | | |

== Setlist ==
=== Typical first leg setlist ===
1. Justine
2. Positively 4th Street
3. Clean-Cut Kid
4. I'll Remember You
5. Trust Yourself
6. That Lucky Old Sun
7. Masters of War
8. A Hard Rain's A-Gonna Fall
9. Girl from the North Country
10. It's Alright, Ma (I'm Only Bleeding)
11. I Forgot More Than You'll Ever Know
12. Just Like a Woman
13. I'm Moving On
14. Lenny Bruce
15. When the Night Comes Falling from the Sky
16. Lonesome Town
17. Ballad of a Thin Man
18. Seeing the Real You at Last
19. Rainy Day Women #12 & 35
20. Across The Borderline
21. Like a Rolling Stone
22. I and I
23. In the Garden
24. Blowin' in the Wind
  Encore
25. Rock 'Em Dead
26. Knockin' on Heaven's Door

=== Typical second leg setlist ===
1. So Long, Good Luck and Goodbye
2. Positively 4th Street
3. Clean-Cut Kid
4. I'll Remember You
5. Shot of Love
6. We Had It All
7. Masters of War
8. To Ramona
9. Shake a Hand
10. One Too Many Mornings
11. A Hard Rain's A-Gonna Fall
12. I Forgot More Than You'll Ever Know
13. Band of the Hand
14. When the Night Comes Falling from the Sky
15. Lonesome Town
16. Ballad of a Thin Man
17. Rainy Day Women #12 & 35
18. Seeing the Real You at Last
19. Across the Borderline
20. I and I
21. Like a Rolling Stone
22. In the Garden
  Encore
23. Blowin' in the Wind
24. Knockin' on Heaven's Door
