= Traveling Wilburys Vol. 3 =

Studio album by Traveling Wilburys
- Released: October 29, 1990
- Recorded: March–May and July 1990
- Studios: Wilbury Mountain Studio, Los Angeles; FPSHOT, Oxfordshire
- Genres: Folk rock, pop rock
- Length: 36:13
- Labels: Wilbury; Warner Bros.
- Producers: Spike Wilbury; Clayton Wilbury

Traveling Wilburys chronology
Traveling Wilburys Vol. 1 (1988)	Traveling Wilburys Vol. 3 (1990)	The Traveling Wilburys Collection (2007)

Singles from Traveling Wilburys Vol. 3
- 1. "She's My Baby" Released: 5 November 1990; 2. "Inside Out" Released: February 1991; 3. "Wilbury Twist" Released: 25 March 1991

Professional ratings
Review scores
Source	Rating
AllMusic	3/5 stars
Chicago Tribune	3/4 stars
Christgau's Consumer Guide	B+
DownBeat	4/5 stars
The Encyclopedia of Popular Music	3/5 stars
Entertainment Weekly	B+
Rolling Stone	3.5/5 stars
Uncut	4/5 stars

Traveling Wilburys Vol. 3 is the second and final studio album by the Traveling Wilburys, a group consisting of George Harrison, Jeff Lynne, Bob Dylan and Tom Petty. It was released on October 29, 1990, as the follow-up to their 1988 debut, Traveling Wilburys Vol. 1. The band members again adopted pseudonyms for their contributions, using new names from the fictitious Wilbury brothers.

== History ==
Though it was their second release, the album was mischievously titled Vol. 3 by George Harrison to play a joke on fans. According to Jeff Lynne, "That was George's idea. He said, 'Let's confuse the buggers.'"

As the dynamics within the band had shifted with Roy Orbison's death, the four remaining members all adopted new Wilbury pseudonyms: Spike (George Harrison), Clayton (Jeff Lynne), Muddy (Tom Petty) and Boo (Bob Dylan). With Harrison and Lynne producing again, the sessions were undertaken in March–May and July 1990. An additional track, a cover of "Nobody's Child", was recorded and released in June 1990 as a charity single in aid of Olivia Harrison's Romanian Angel Appeal. The song was also the title track of a multi-artist fundraising album compiled by the Harrisons, Nobody's Child: Romanian Angel Appeal. Traveling Wilburys Vol. 3 was dedicated to the memory of "Lefty Wilbury" (Roy Orbison).

Released on October 29 in the UK, and on October 30 in the US, the album was less positively received than Vol. 1, yet still saw a fair measure of success. In the United States, "She's My Baby" (with guest guitarist Gary Moore) and "Inside Out" became radio hits, charting at number 2 and number 16, respectively, on Billboard's Album Rock Tracks chart. The album peaked at number 14 in the UK and number 11 in the US, where it was certified platinum by the RIAA.

Comparing the two Wilburys albums, a reviewer in The New York Times wrote in November 1990: "The superstar pop group stays close to 50's and 60's rock roots, drawing on blues, doo-wop, rockabilly and Buddy Holly. But their second album is faster, jokier, lighter and meaner than the first." Rolling Stone described the blending of the four participants' musical styles as "seemingly effortless", and said that the album showed they continued to enjoy their collaboration. In the years following Vol. 3, there was speculation about further Wilbury releases. Since Harrison was viewed as the de facto leader of the group, his death in November 2001 ended the possibility of any future projects.

When Harrison's distribution deal with Warner Bros. expired in 1995, ownership of his Dark Horse Records catalog and the two Wilburys albums reverted to him, and the albums went out of print. On June 12, 2007, Vol. 1 and Vol. 3 were reissued by Rhino Records as The Traveling Wilburys Collection, packaged together with bonus tracks and a DVD.

== Track listing ==
All tracks are written by Traveling Wilburys, except "Nobody's Child" written by Cy Coben and Mel Foree; and "Runaway", written by Max Crook and Del Shannon.

Side one
No.	Title	Lead vocals	Length
1.	"She's My Baby"	all	3:15
2.	"Inside Out"	Bob Dylan (Bridge: George Harrison; Chorus: Tom Petty)	3:35
3.	"If You Belonged to Me"	Dylan	3:13
4.	"The Devil's Been Busy"	all (Bridge: Dylan)	3:18
5.	"7 Deadly Sins"	Dylan	3:17
6.	"Poor House"	Jeff Lynne and Petty	3:16

Side two
No.	Title	Lead vocals	Length
7.	"Where Were You Last Night?"	Dylan and Harrison	3:03
8.	"Cool Dry Place"	Petty	3:37
9.	"New Blue Moon"	Harrison, Lynne and Petty (Bridge: Dylan)	3:20
10.	"You Took My Breath Away"	Petty (Bridge: Lynne)	3:18
11.	"Wilbury Twist"	all	2:58

Bonus tracks on the 2007 CD reissue
No.	Title	Lead vocals	Length
12.	"Nobody's Child"	all	3:29
13.	"Runaway"	Lynne	2:31

== Personnel ==
Traveling Wilburys

- Clayton Wilbury (Jeff Lynne) – acoustic and electric guitars, bass, keyboards, lead and backing vocals
- Spike Wilbury (George Harrison) – acoustic, electric and slide guitars, mandolin, sitar, lead and backing vocals
- Boo Wilbury (Bob Dylan) – acoustic guitar, harmonica, lead and backing vocals
- Muddy Wilbury (Tom Petty) – acoustic guitar, lead and backing vocals

Additional personnel

- Buster Sidebury (Jim Keltner) – drums, percussion
- Jim Horn – saxophones
- Ray Cooper – percussion
- Ken Wilbury (Gary Moore) – lead guitar on "She's My Baby"
- Eric Idle (as Prof. "Tiny" Hampton) – liner notes

Production

- Spike Wilbury – production
- Nelson Wilbury – production
- Richard Dodd – engineering
- David Costa – original art direction and design for Wherefore Art?
- Nicky Hames – original art direction and design for Wherefore Art?
- Caroline Greyshock – sleeve photography
- Julian Hawkins – Wilbury Twist photography

== Charts ==
=== Weekly charts ===
Chart (1990–91)	Position
Australian ARIA Albums Chart	14
Austrian Albums Chart	22
Canadian RPM 100 Albums	6
Dutch Mega Albums Chart	55
German Media Control Albums Chart	23
Japanese Oricon Albums Chart	79
New Zealand Albums Chart	19
Norwegian VG-lista Albums Chart	3
Swedish Albums Chart	5
Swiss Albums Chart	18
UK Albums Chart	14
US Billboard 200	11
US Cash Box Top 200 Albums	5

=== Year-end charts ===
Chart (1990)	Position
Canadian Albums Chart	44

Chart (1991)	Position
Canadian Albums Chart	51
US Billboard 200	76

=== Certifications ===
Region	Certification	Certified units/sales
Australia (ARIA)	Platinum	70,000^{^}
Canada (Music Canada)	Platinum	100,000^{^}
United Kingdom (BPI)	Gold	100,000^{^}
United States (RIAA)	Platinum	1,000,000^{^}
^{^} Shipments figures based on certification alone.
