= John Brown (song) =

1962 song by Bob Dylan

Song by Bob Dylan
- Recorded: February 1963
- Studio: Broadside Records, New York City (original studio version)
- Genre: Folk; anti-war song
- Songwriter(s): Bob Dylan

Audio
- "John Brown" (Live at the Gaslight, 1962) on YouTube

"John Brown" is a song by American singer-songwriter Bob Dylan. The song, written in October 1962 was released under his pseudonym "Blind Boy Grunt" on the Folkways Records compilation album Broadside Ballads, Vol. 1 (1963). Live performances have been officially released on MTV Unplugged (1995), Live at The Gaslight 1962 (2005), and Live 1962–1966 – Rare Performances From The Copyright Collections (2018). A demo version was issued on The Bootleg Series Vol. 9 – The Witmark Demos: 1962–1964 (2010).

It is an anti-war song that draws on traditional tunes and themes, and narrates the tale of a mother who is proud to see her son go off to war. He returns badly injured and reflects on how the enemy looks just like him, before dropping his medals into his mother's hands. The song has received a mixed reception from critics, with some finding performances impactful and others criticizing the callowness of the lyrics. According to his official website, Dylan has performed the song in concert 170 times, most recently in 2012. "John Brown" was covered by the Staple Singers for their 1967 album Pray On.

== Composition and recording ==
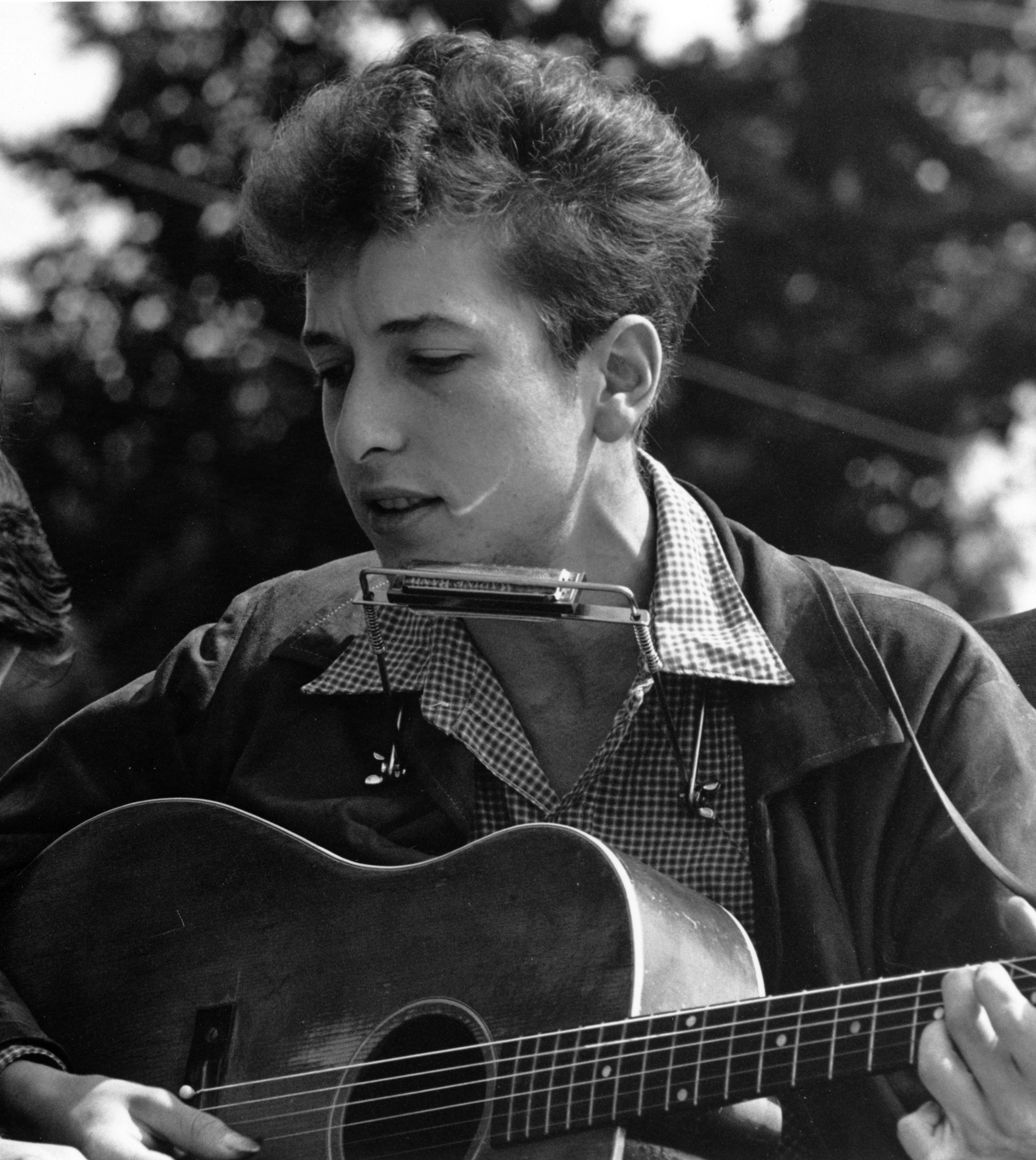
For contractual reasons, Dylan (pictured in 1963) used a pseudonym, "Blind Boy Grunt", for "John Brown" on Broadside Ballads, Vol. 1 (1963).

Bob Dylan wrote "John Brown" in October 1962. Around this time, Dylan often drew on traditional songs when writing his own. While the lyrics to "John Brown" are original, the melody is based on "900 Miles", a well-known song in the US folk music community; (Note: Folklorist Norm Cohen writes that while 900 miles is the most common distance referenced in the traditional song, other distances including 400 miles, 500 miles and 10,000 miles are also used in versions.) about half of that tune is also found in the traditional song "Reuben's Train". When the song was published in Broadside magazine in March 1963, an accompanying note read "Tune, much like '900 Miles'."

"John Brown" is an anti-war song. The lyrics are influenced by "Mrs. McGrath", which relates how a young Irish soldier is maimed after fighting in the British Army against Napoleon's forces, and is met by his mother who asks how he was injured. In Dylan's song, a soldier's mother expresses her pride at him going off to war. He returns home from a war overseas, badly injured and wearing a metal brace around his waist. He tells his mother: "I couldn't help but think, through the thunder rolling and stink / That I was just a puppet in a play". The authors Philippe Margotin and Jean-Michel Guesdon remark that this couplet is echoed in Dylan's "Only a Pawn in Their Game" (1963). The soldier reflects "when my enemy came close / I could see that his face looked just like mine". The song ends with the soldier dropping his medals into his mother's hand. In a live May 1963 radio interview with broadcaster and historian Studs Terkel, during which he performed the song, Dylan said that it was based on the true case of a contemporary soldier, but the historian Sean Wilentz, author of Bob Dylan in America, calls the song "wholly fictional".

A live version recorded during his show at The Gaslight Cafe, New York, in October 1962 was eventually released on Live at The Gaslight 1962 (2005). In response to an open invitation from the folk music Broadside magazine for recordings, Dylan recorded a version of "John Brown" in February 1963 that was released on the compilation album Broadside Ballads, Vol. 1 (1963) and later included on The Best Of Broadside 1962–1988 (2000). Dylan used a pseudonym, "Blind Boy Grunt", due to contractual issues; he was signed to Columbia Records but Broadside Ballads, Vol. 1 was released by Folkways Records. He did not attempt the song at the recording sessions for his album The Freewheelin' Bob Dylan album, which had started in April 1962 and concluded in April 1963. Nor was it included in the recording sessions for its successor The Times They Are a-Changin', which happened in August and October 1963. A demo of the song performed for publishing company M. Witmark & Sons in August 1963 was officially released in 2010 on The Bootleg Series Vol. 9 – The Witmark Demos: 1962–1964. Dylan frequently revises the music and lyrics for his songs both in recording studios and in live performance. The music scholar Todd Harvey compared five performances of "John Brown" from 1962 and 1963 and concluded that after The Gaslight Cafe show, that Dylan maintained a consistent set of lyrics for "John Brown", with the exception of the eighth verse.

== Critical comments ==
In the Vancouver Sun in 1970, the critic Al Rudis referred to "John Brown" as "one of the best yet least known Dylan protest songs", calling the Broadside Ballads version "chilling", and comparing it to the screenwriter Dalton Trumbo's 1939 novel Johnny Got His Gun; both works give a severely-injured soldier's perspective. Dylan's biographer Robert Shelton wrote that "Although the ironies of battlefield heroism are timeworn, the story is effective."

Last verse of "John Brown"

As he turned away to walk, his Ma was still in shock
At seein' the metal brace that helped him stand
But as he turned to go, he called his mother close
And he dropped his medals down into her hand

— Bob Dylan, from his official website

In 1994, Dylan recorded the song for his MTV Unplugged episode. The critic Jim Beviglia considered what he described as the "furious bluegrass" version of "John Brown" the highlight of the Unplugged album. He opined that despite the stark and harsh sentiment of the lyrics, Dylan's capacity for empathy can be detected. The song was also picked as a highlight from the album by Mark Robinson of the Reno Gazette-Journal, who felt it was impactful despite a failure on Dylan's part to deliver the final line about the soldier handing over his medals to his mother as the "brutal punchline" it should have been. Dave Ferman of the Fort Worth Star-Telegram wrote that the song was delivered with a "wonderful, hushed urgency". The critic John Nogowski gave the Unplugged version an A rating, considering it superior to The Bootleg Series Vol. 9 take which he rated as C+.

Authors Philippe Margotin and Jean-Michel Guesdon commented that Dylan, who was 21 when he composed the song, "had little life experience" at that point. The Dylan scholar Michael Gray compared it unfavorably to "Arthur McBride", covered by Dylan on Good as I Been to You (1992), arguing that "John Brown" is "polemical and built upon lurid stereotypes to the exclusion of all real observation". Gray expresses surprise that Dylan had decided to perform "John Brown" in concert in the 1980s and 1990s, dismissing it as "too awful" for inclusion on one of Dylan's official albums, and the "cringe-making" nadir of early Bob Dylan bootleg recordings. The song was denigrated as "crass" by Dylan's biographer Clinton Heylin. The journalist and author Mike Marqusee criticized the quality of the lyrics, but found that the song's "repugnance at jingoism, glancing references to class, filial rage, and anguished opening to an internationalist vision, the song shows Dylan working to synthesize something new, a contemporary folk music that was emotionally raw and politically uncompromising".

== Live performances ==
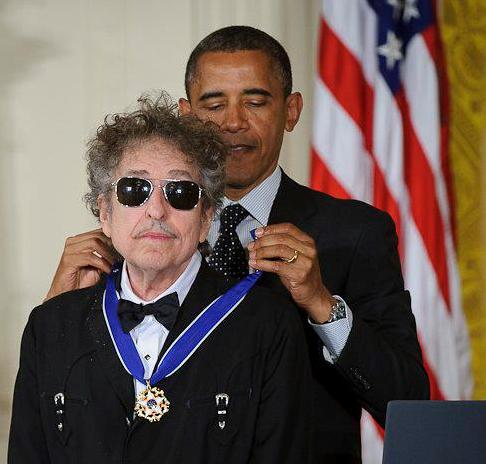
Dylan, pictured being presented with a Presidential Medal of Freedom by Barack Obama, last performed "John Brown" in concert in 2012.

According to Bob Dylan's official website, he has performed "John Brown" in concert 180 times. The website lists the 1962 Gaslight Cafe performance as the live debut, followed by a second live rendition at the Town Hall, New York, in April 1963. The latter performance was due to be included on Bob Dylan in Concert, an album planned for 1964 but never issued. It was, however, included on Live 1962–1966 – Rare Performances From The Copyright Collections (2018).

The song was absent from Dylan's live sets from around 1964 until 1987. During rehearsals for the Bob Dylan and the Grateful Dead 1987 Tour, Jerry Garcia of the Grateful Dead had suggested that they play the song. Dylan continued to include the song in some setlists on his 1987 Temples in Flames Tour with Tom Petty and the Heartbreakers, and on the Never Ending Tour from 1988. The Unplugged version recorded in 1994 was included on his MTV Unplugged album, and the video release of the show, in 1995. As of September 2023, his most recent live performance of the song was in October 2012.

== Credits and personnel ==
=== Witmark Studio recording, August 1963 ===
Musicians

- Bob Dylan – vocals, rhythm guitar

Technical personnel

- Ivan Augenblink – sound engineering

=== MTV Unplugged ===
Musicians

- Bob Dylan – vocals, rhythm guitar
- Tony Garnier – bass
- John Jackson – guitar
- Bucky Baxter – pedal steel or dobro
- Winston Watson – drums
- Brendan O'Brien – Hammond organ

Technical personnel

- Greg Calbi – mastering
- Ed Cherney – mixing
- Randy Ezratty – engineering
- Scott Hull – mastering
- Jeff Rosen – executive producer
- Don Was – mixing

== Cover versions ==
The Staple Singers covered "John Brown" on their 1967 album Pray On. The Los Angeles Times critic Pete Johnson praised the lead vocals for "achiev[ing] a delicate balance between pathos and understatement". (Note: Johnson identifies Roebuck Staples as the lead singer, but Greg Kot writes that it was Pervis Staples.) A 2021 Variety listing of "The 80 Best Bob Dylan Covers" included it, with the critic Chris Morris describing the cover as a "restrained, haunting treatment". The Staple Singers version influenced Maria Muldaur's cover on her 2008 album Yes We Can!, which was described by Andrew S. Hughes of the South Bend Tribune as a "chilling, visceral rendition". Muldaur told Hughes that Dylan was her favorite songwriter, and praised Dylan's "John Brown", "Masters of War" (1963) and "License to Kill" (1983) as "eloquent expressions of the anti-war sentiment".

== See also ==
- List of Bob Dylan songs based on earlier tunes
- List of anti-war songs
