= Saint of Circumstance =

Live album by Grateful Dead
- Released: September 27, 2019
- Recorded: June 17, 1991
- Venues: Giants Stadium; East Rutherford, New Jersey
- Genre: Rock
- Label: Rhino
- Producer: Grateful Dead

Grateful Dead chronology
Giants Stadium 1987, 1989, 1991 (2019)	Saint of Circumstance (2019)	Dave's Picks Volume 32 (2019)

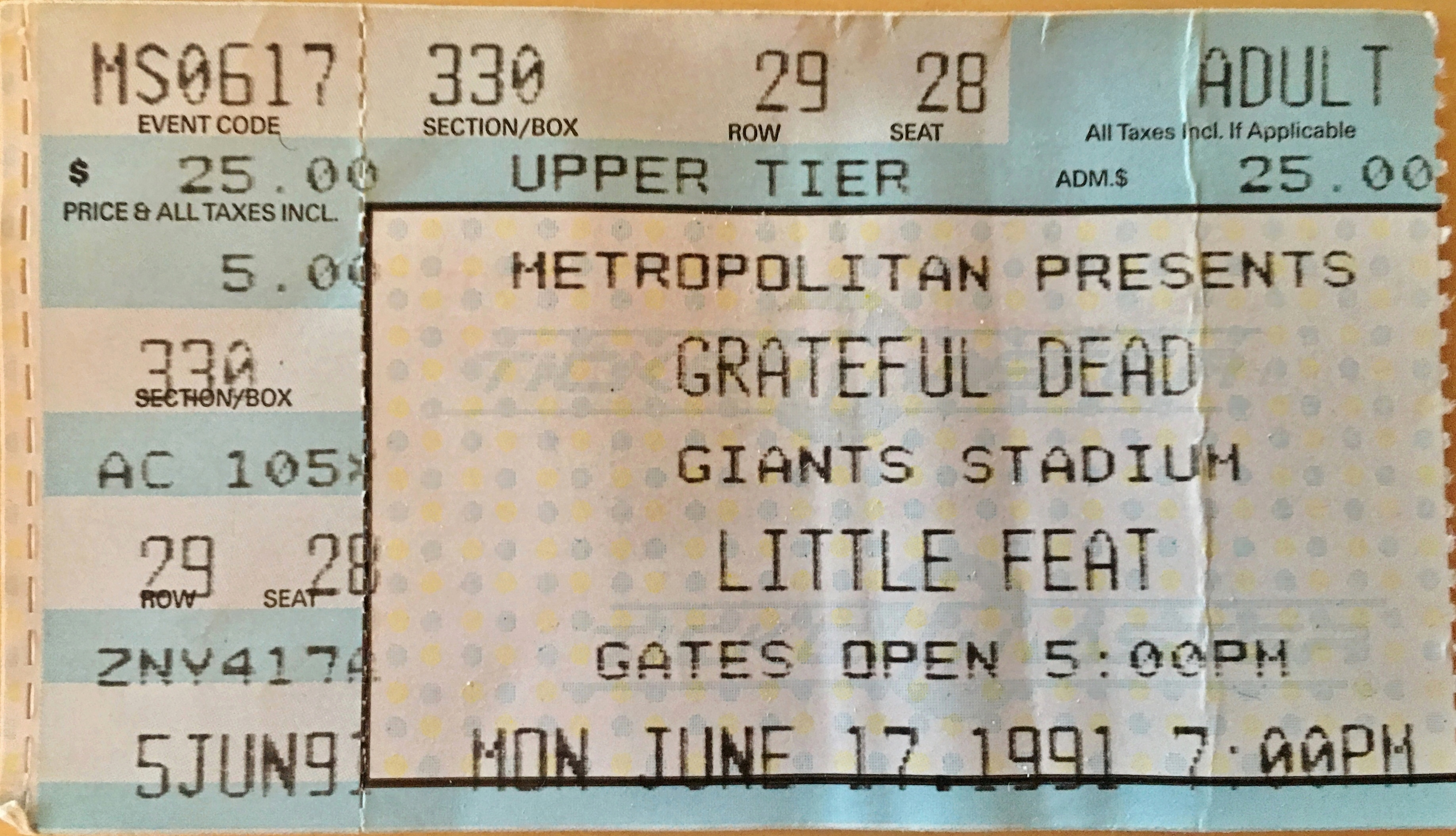
Ticket stub from the concert

Saint of Circumstance is a live album by the rock band the Grateful Dead. It contains the complete concert recorded at Giants Stadium in East Rutherford, New Jersey on June 17, 1991. It was released on September 27, 2019, on three CDs or five LPs. The same recording was also released the same day as part of the 14-CD album Giants Stadium 1987, 1989, 1991.

A video of this concert was shown in theaters on August 1, 2019, and on August 8 and 10, 2026, for the Grateful Dead Meet-Up at the Movies.

== Critical reception ==
Professional ratings
Review scores
Source	Rating
All About Jazz	4/5 stars
AllMusic	3.5/5 stars

On AllMusic, Timothy Monger wrote, "A somewhat legendary taper's classic, the band's second night at New Jersey's 80,000 capacity Giants Stadium in the summer of 1991 was a predictably unpredictable behemoth lauded more for its oddities than overall cohesion. Boasting the relatively short-lived two-man keyboard battery of Bruce Hornsby (piano, accordion) and Vince Welnick (synths), the show's lush tonal palette was a hallmark of this era.... ["Dark Star"] seems to exist as more of a spiritual undercurrent, spurring on other improvisations, some of which get quite heady."

Doug Collette of All About Jazz commented: "Garcia's guitar playing is pointed and precise, while his navigation of the ensemble is careful, purposeful and rife with surprise in both selection of song(s) and the segues between them." He noted: "this setlist is full of material through which the late cultural icon speaks or tenders implicit personal observation that add weight even to otherwise slight songs like 'Loose Lucy'."

== Track listing ==
Disc 1

First set:

1. "Eyes of the World" > (Jerry Garcia, Robert Hunter) – 15:26
2. "Walkin' Blues" (Robert Johnson, arranged by Bob Weir) – 7:01
3. "Brown-Eyed Women" (Garcia, Hunter) – 6:10
4. "Dark Star" > (Garcia, Mickey Hart, Bill Kreutzmann, Phil Lesh, Ron McKernan, Weir, Hunter) – 1:32
5. "When I Paint My Masterpiece" (Bob Dylan) – 5:28
6. "Loose Lucy" (Garcia, Hunter) – 9:16
7. "Cassidy" (Weir, John Perry Barlow) – 7:11
8. "Might as Well" (Garcia, Hunter) – 6:41

Disc 2

Second set:

1. "Saint of Circumstance" > (Weir, Barlow) – 10:55
2. "Ship of Fools" > (Garcia, Hunter) – 8:01
3. "Dark Star" > (Garcia, Hart, Kreutzmann, Lesh, McKernan, Weir, Hunter) – 1:14
4. "Truckin'" > (Garcia, Lesh, Weir, Hunter) – 6:55
5. "New Speedway Boogie" > (Garcia, Hunter) – 9:12
6. "Dark Star" > (Garcia, Hart, Kreutzmann, Lesh, McKernan, Weir, Hunter) – 0:55
7. "Uncle John's Band" > (Garcia, Hunter) – 11:18
8. "Dark Star" > (Garcia, Hart, Kreutzmann, Lesh, McKernan, Weir, Hunter) – 8:05
9. "Drums" (Hart, Kreutzmann) – 12:30

Disc 3

1. "Space" > (Garcia, Lesh, Weir) – 8:47
2. "China Doll" > (Garcia, Hunter) – 5:07
3. "Playing in the Band" > (Weir, Hart, Hunter) – 4:35
4. "Sugar Magnolia" (Weir, Hunter) – 10:53

Encore:

5. "The Weight" (Robbie Robertson) – 6:20

== Personnel ==
Grateful Dead

- Jerry Garcia – guitar, vocals
- Bob Weir – guitar, vocals
- Phil Lesh – bass, vocals
- Bill Kreutzmann – drums
- Mickey Hart – drums
- Vince Welnick – keyboards, vocals
- Bruce Hornsby – keyboards, vocals

Production

- Produced by Grateful Dead
- Produced for release by David Lemieux
- Recording: John Cutler
- Mixing: Jeffrey Norman
- Mastering: David Glasser
- Engineering: Dave Hewitt, Dave Roberts, Jamie Howarth
- Art direction, design: Lisa Glines, Doran Tyson, Steve Vance
- Photos: David Rae Morris, James R. Anderson, Bob Minkin

== Charts ==
Chart (2019)	Peak position
Hungarian Albums (MAHASZ)	19
