= Inside Out (Traveling Wilburys song) =

- German picture sleeve

Single by the Traveling Wilburys

from the album Traveling Wilburys Vol. 3
- Released: February 1991
- Genre: Pop rock, jangle pop
- Length: 3:35
- Label: Wilbury
- Songwriter: Traveling Wilburys
- Producers: Spike Wilbury, Clayton Wilbury

The Traveling Wilburys singles chronology
"She's My Baby" (1990)	"Inside Out" (1991)	"Wilbury Twist" (1991)

Music video
- "Inside Out" on YouTube

"Inside Out" is a song by the British–American supergroup the Traveling Wilburys from their 1990 album Traveling Wilburys Vol. 3. It was written by all the members of the band, which had been reduced to a foursome following the death of Roy Orbison in December 1988, and it was the first song they worked on for the album. The lyrics address environmental issues and describe a world turned yellow.

Recording for the track began at a private studio in Bel Air in Los Angeles, in April 1990, and was completed three months later at George Harrison's Friar Park studio in England. The song was released on a commercial single in selected countries in February 1991, backed by an instrumental version of the Vol. 3 track "New Blue Moon". The single peaked at number 50 on Canada's RPM chart and 117 on the ARIA singles chart.

== Composition and recording ==
"Inside Out" was the first song written and recorded for the Traveling Wilburys' second album, which they jokingly titled Vol. 3. Reduced to a four-piece following the death of Roy Orbison in December 1988, the group gathered at a private house they dubbed "Camp Wilbury", at the top of Coldwater Canyon in Bel Air, in April 1990, for the writing and initial recording sessions. George Harrison recalled that he, Tom Petty, Jeff Lynne and Bob Dylan had the musical part of the song finished "within an hour" of starting work. He said this encouraged him to realise that the band would be able to continue as before, despite the loss of Orbison.

The song addresses ecology and environmental issues. The lyrics refer to a world where the sky, the grass and drain water have all mysteriously turned yellow. Harrison said in a 1990 interview:

Bob or Tom came up with the idea: "Look out your window, the grass ain't green ..." and I said, "It's kinda yellow ..." then somebody else said, "See what I mean?" So then we got the next bit: "Look up your chimney, the sky ain't blue, it's kinda yellow ..." It became a joke almost every time the third line came, it kept being "yellow". It's quite funny because the last words are, "Look into the future in your mystic crystal ball, see if it ain't yellow ... see if it's there at all."

The principal singers are Dylan and Petty, with Harrison taking over in the bridge. Author Ian Inglis identifies the main narrative as a seemingly "private … joke" between Dylan and Petty, whereas Harrison's section provides a welcome element of musical and lyrical intrigue in which, "stressing the need to be watchful, he warns that 'something's happening out there.'" BBC Radio presenter Bob Harris said of the song: "Though jokey in spirit, 'Inside Out' did have a serious message about damage being done to the environment."

The Wilburys, together with their drummer, Jim Keltner, recorded the basic track for "Inside Out" in Bel Air. As with all the songs on the album, other instrumentation and the vocals were overdubbed at Harrison's Friar Park studio in July.

== Release ==
The song was sequenced as the second track on Vol. 3, between "She's My Baby" and "If You Belonged to Me". The album was released on the band's Wilbury record label on 29 October 1990 in the UK and 6 November in the United States.

Authors Chip Madinger and Mark Easter describe "Inside Out" as arguably the most commercial track on Vol. 3. Warner Bros. Records, which distributed Wilbury Records, considered the song for release on a commercial single in the US but, as with "She's My Baby", decided to issue it only as a promotional single there. The band filmed a music video for "Inside Out", in which the four Wilburys and Keltner are seen performing the track. Set on a concert stage, the original clip began with the sound of an orchestra warming up and closed with muted applause.

The song was given a commercial single release in Australia, Canada and Germany, with an instrumental version of the Vol. 3 track "New Blue Moon" as the B-side. The single peaked at number 50 on Canada's RPM 100. In the US, the song reached number 16 on Billboard's Album Rock Tracks chart.

== Critical reception ==
Writing for the website Ultimate Classic Rock, Frank Mastropolo says that Vol. 3 suffered from having its best track, "She's My Baby", sequenced as the album opener, but he includes "Inside Out" among the songs that show that the album was still "not without its moments". He adds that the adoption of shared lead vocals "[echoes] the give-and-take that made the first album so popular". In her album review for New York magazine in 1990, Elizabeth Wurtzel wrote: "The Wilburys deserve praise for delivering songs about the environment ('Inside Out') and other issues with a fun, doo-wop tone that is never preachy but also never downplays the seriousness of the subject matter … Somehow, the combination of talent has allowed them to come up with songs that can be heartbreaking and frightening."

In another contemporary review, Greg Kot of the Chicago Tribune welcomed the song's musical quote from the Byrds' "Chimes of Freedom", pairing it with the Wilburys' rewriting of the standard "Blue Moon" as "7 Deadly Sins", and said that "For all its disposability, this record is loaded with charm." Writing in Rolling Stone in 2002, Kot cited "Inside Out" among examples of Vol. 3's "ingratiating goofiness" and said that, more so than the band's debut, the album demonstrated the Wilburys' embrace of a "common vernacular in the rock & roll of the Fifties and early Sixties". In his review of the 2007 box set The Traveling Wilburys Collection, for Mojo, Phil Sutcliffe said that "Inside Out", "If You Belonged to Me" and "You Took My Breath Away" represented the "engaging sort of pop-rocking" typical of Vol. 3 and that, when played next to Vol. 1, "you can't hear the join."

== Track listing ==
German CD maxi-single

1. "Inside Out" (Album Version)
2. "New Blue Moon" (Instrumental)
3. "Cold Dry Place" (Album Version)

== Charts ==
Chart performance for "Inside Out"
Chart (1991)	Peak position
Australia (ARIA)	117
Canada (RPM)	50

== Sources ==
- Clayson, Alan (2003). George Harrison. London: Sanctuary. ISBN 1-86074-489-3.
- The Editors of Rolling Stone (2002). Harrison. New York, NY: Rolling Stone Press. ISBN 978-0-7432-3581-5.
- Heylin, Clinton (2011). Bob Dylan: Behind the Shades (20th Anniversary ed.). London: Faber and Faber. ISBN 978-0-571-27240-2.
- Huntley, Elliot J. (2006). Mystical One: George Harrison – After the Break-up of the Beatles. Toronto, ON: Guernica Editions. ISBN 1-55071-197-0.
- Inglis, Ian (2010). The Words and Music of George Harrison. Santa Barbara, CA: Praeger. ISBN 978-0-313-37532-3.
- Kozinn, Allan (1992). "Solo Beatles". In DeCurtis, Anthony; Henke, James; George-Warren, Holly; Miller, Jim (eds.). The Rolling Stone Illustrated History of Rock & Roll: The Definitive History of the Most Important Artists and Their Music. New York, NY: Straight Arrow. ISBN 0-679-73728-6.
- Leng, Simon (2006). While My Guitar Gently Weeps: The Music of George Harrison. Milwaukee, WI: Hal Leonard. ISBN 978-1-4234-0609-9.
- Madinger, Chip; Easter, Mark (2000). Eight Arms to Hold You: The Solo Beatles Compendium. Chesterfield, MO: 44.1 Productions. ISBN 0-615-11724-4.
- Romanowski, Patricia; George-Warren, Holly, eds. (1995). The New Rolling Stone Encyclopedia of Rock & Roll. New York, NY: Fireside/Rolling Stone Press. ISBN 0-684-81044-1.
- Van der Kiste, John (2015). Jeff Lynne: The Electric Light Orchestra, Before and After. Stroud, UK: Fonthill Media. ISBN 978-1-78155-492-0.
- Zanes, Warren, ed. (2007). Tom Petty and the Heartbreakers: Runnin' Down a Dream. San Francisco, CA: Chronicle Books. ISBN 978-0-8118-6201-1.
- Zollo, Paul (2005). Conversations with Tom Petty. New York, NY: Omnibus Press. ISBN 1-84449-815-8.
