= Grateful Dead Meet-Up at the Movies =

Annual event at multiple US locations

Film poster for the Grateful Dead Meet-Up at the Movies 2015

Grateful Dead Meet-Up at the Movies is an annual event that began in 2011. At the Meet-Up, concert videos and films of the rock band the Grateful Dead are shown in movie theaters at multiple locations. Each yearly screening occurs only once. The event provides a venue and opportunity for the band's fans, known as Deadheads, to gather in celebration and camaraderie.

From 2011 to 2018, the Grateful Dead Meet-Up at the Movies was shown at movie theaters throughout the United States, and was organized and managed by Fathom Events. The 2019 Meet-Up was shown internationally, with Trafalgar Releasing as the distribution partner.

== 2011 ==
The first Grateful Dead Meet-Up at the Movies, on April 20, 2011, screened The Grateful Dead Movie in U.S. movie theaters. The Grateful Dead Movie is a music documentary that focuses on the band's October 16 to 20, 1974 performances at the Winterland Arena. It also includes interviews with the band members, and archival footage from earlier in their career. Shot on 35 mm film, it was co-directed by Jerry Garcia, and was originally released in theaters in 1977.

== 2012 ==
The 2012 event occurred on April 19 at 7:00 pm local time in selected movie theaters around the U.S., and aired the Grateful Dead's performance of July 18, 1989, at the Alpine Valley Music Theatre near East Troy, Wisconsin. This concert took place one day after the Alpine Valley show documented in the feature-length music video Downhill from Here, which was released in 1997.

== 2013 ==
The 2013 event occurred on August 1 and featured the music documentary film Sunshine Daydream in select U.S. movie theaters. Sunshine Daydream was shot at the concert performed on August 27, 1972 at the Old Renaissance Faire Grounds in Veneta, Oregon, and includes extensive footage of the audience as well as the band. In 2013 the movie was re-edited and restored from the original 16 mm film negatives, and remastered to a high-definition digital projection for the screening. The audio was also completely remastered. The film was shown in about 450 movie theaters in the U.S. The following month, Sunshine Daydream was released on DVD and Blu-ray, packaged together with a three-CD album of the complete Veneta concert.

== 2014 ==
The 2014 meet-up occurred on July 17 in movie theaters nationwide in the United States, and aired the Grateful Dead's performance of April 21, 1972, at the Beat Club television studio in Bremen, West Germany. The screenings began at 7:30 pm local time nationwide. The presentation was prepared from restored video from the original Beat Club broadcast and re-mastered audio from the original analog magnetic tapes. It also included a behind-the-scenes look at the production of an upcoming Grateful Dead release, with Bob Weir on guitar and vocals, and Jeffrey Norman performing mixing and mastering.

== 2015 ==
Grateful Dead Meet-Up at the Movies 2015 occurred on May 4, 2015, with the presentation of a previously unreleased video of the Grateful Dead concert performed at the Alpine Valley Music Theatre near East Troy, Wisconsin on July 19, 1989. The performance lasted approximately 160 minutes. This was the show performed the night after the one shown at the 2012 meet-up. The 2015 event took place in over 400 movie theaters in the United States. Screenings began nationwide at 7:00 pm local time. The concert was recorded in analog video format using multiple cameras, and the sound in movie theaters was in Dolby Stereo. Some of the content aired included additional content that was exclusive to the cinema presentations, which was previously unreleased. The concert was also aired on YouTube, but the additional exclusive content played only in cinema presentations was not included in the YouTube presentation.

== 2016 ==
The 2016 Meet-Up featured a previously unreleased video of the Grateful Dead concert performed on July 2, 1989, at Sullivan Stadium in Foxborough, Massachusetts. The concert was screened on May 11, 2016.

== 2017 ==
The Meet-Up for 2017 took place on August 1, the 75th anniversary of the birth of Jerry Garcia. It featured the Grateful Dead's performance of July 12, 1989, at RFK Stadium in Washington, D.C.

Also in 2017, The Grateful Dead Movie was shown in theaters one time only, on April 20 (4/20). The screening was in honor of the 40th anniversary of that film, which was released in 1977. Also shown was a preview of the then-soon-to-be-released documentary film Long Strange Trip, and a short documentary about the concert recorded in the album Cornell 5/8/77.

== 2018 ==
The 2018 Meet-Up took place on August 1. The theatrical presentation was the July 7, 1989 Grateful Dead concert performed at John F. Kennedy Stadium in Philadelphia. The same concert was released in 2010 as the audio/video album Crimson White & Indigo.

== 2019 ==
The 2019 Grateful Dead Meet-Up at the Movies was on August 1. It featured the band's June 17, 1991 concert at Giants Stadium in East Rutherford, New Jersey. For the first time, the Meet-Up was shown internationally instead of just in the U.S., with Trafalgar Releasing replacing Fathom Events as the distribution partner. A recording of the same concert was released in the albums Giants Stadium 1987, 1989, 1991 and Saint of Circumstance. The former also includes the video of the show.

== 2022 ==
The 2022 Grateful Dead Meet-Up at the Movies took place on November 1, with a second screening on November 5. To commemorate the 50th anniversary of the band's Europe '72 tour, it featured songs selected from their April 17, 1972 concert at the Tivoli Concert Hall in Copenhagen, Denmark, which was broadcast on Danish TV.

== 2023 ==
The 2023 Grateful Dead Meet-Up at the movies took place on June 22 and June 24. It featured the concert video from the band's June 22, 1991 performance at Soldier Field in Chicago, their first concert at that venue.

== 2025 ==
The 2025 Grateful Dead Meet-Up at the Movies took place on August 14, with a showing of The Grateful Dead Movie on regular and IMAX screens. Additional screenings took place on August 13 – 17. This was the first time that a Meet-Up was shown in IMAX format. Following the movie was bonus footage of "China Cat Sunflower" and "I Know You Rider" from the same October 1974 run of shows at Winterland.

== 2026 ==
The 2026 Grateful Dead Meet-Up at the Movies took place on August 8 and 10. The event featured the band's June 17, 1991 concert at Giants Stadium in East Rutherford, New Jersey. The audio for this highly-regarded show was recorded on 48-track analog tape. This is the same concert that was shown at the 2019 Meet-Up, and released as the album Saint of Circumstance.
