= Wilbury Twist =

Single by Traveling Wilburys

from the album Traveling Wilburys Vol. 3
- B-side: "New Blue Moon" (instrumental), "Cool Dry Place"
- Released: March 25, 1991
- Genre: Rock and roll
- Length: 2:56
- Label: Wilbury, Warner Bros.
- Songwriters: George Harrison; Jeff Lynne; Bob Dylan; Tom Petty
- Producers: Spike Wilbury; Clayton Wilbury

Traveling Wilburys singles chronology
"Inside OUt" (1991)	"Wilbury Twist" (1991)

Music Videos
- "Wilbury Twist" on YouTube "Wilbury Twist" (original) on YouTube

"Wilbury Twist" is a song by the British–American supergroup the Traveling Wilburys and is the final track on their 1990 album Traveling Wilburys Vol. 3. The song was also released in March 1991 as the third and final single from that album.

== Music video ==
The original music video featured cameos from many contemporary celebrities including Jimmy Nail, Woody Harrelson, Whoopi Goldberg, Fred Savage, Ben Savage, Kala Savage, Thomas Guzman-Sanchez of Rhythm Tribe, Milli Vanilli, Cheech Marin, John Candy, and Eric Idle. The band and special cameos were shot at the Wilshire Ebell Theatre in Los Angeles. The DVD video in the 2007 box set The Traveling Wilburys Collection retains only a few introductory shots of John Candy and Eric Idle, otherwise simply showing the band members performing the song.

== Track listings ==
- 7" W0018W / 054391933973
1. "Wilbury Twist"
2. "New Blue Moon" (instrumental)
- CD W0018CD / 093624004424, 12" W0018T / 093624004400
1. "Wilbury Twist"
2. "New Blue Moon" (instrumental)
3. "Cool Dry Place"

== Charts ==
Chart (1991)	Peak position
Australia (ARIA)	137
Canadian Singles Chart	86
