= Dave's Picks Volume 32 =

Live album by Grateful Dead
- Released: November 1, 2019
- Recorded: March 24, 1973
- Venues: The Spectrum; Philadelphia, Pennsylvania
- Genre: Rock
- Length: 228:26
- Label: Rhino
- Producer: Grateful Dead

Grateful Dead chronology
| Saint of Circumstance (2019) | Dave's Picks Volume 32 (2019) | Ready or Not (2019) |

Dave's Picks Volume 32 is a 3-CD live album by the rock band the Grateful Dead. It contains the complete concert recorded at the Spectrum in Philadelphia on March 24, 1973. It was released on November 1, 2019 in a limited edition of 20,000 copies.

== Critical reception ==
On AllMusic, Timothy Monger said, "Later [in 1973, the Grateful Dead] would launch their own record label with the release of their sixth studio album, Wake of the Flood, and... [they] were still honing a number of that album's cuts here, including the luminous "Here Comes Sunshine" and the lovely "Stella Blue". An air of poignant uplift surrounds parts this Philadelphia show – included here in its entirety – which took place just a couple of weeks after the death of founding member Ron "Pigpen" McKernan."

In Glide Magazine, Doug Collette wrote, "No inclusions are more striking, however, than the segues of "He’s Gone" > "Truckin'" > "Jam" > "Dark Star" > "Sing Me Back Home".... Concluding the string with the doleful likes of Merle Haggard's song is an ideal set-up for the celebratory air the band conjures up immediately after: "Sugar Magnolia" is a deservedly exhilarating transition at this, one of the group’s favorite venues."

== Track listing ==
Disc 1

First set:

1. "Bertha" (Jerry Garcia, Robert Hunter) – 6:23
2. "Beat It On Down the Line" (Jesse Fuller) – 3:40
3. "Don't Ease Me In" (traditional, arranged by Grateful Dead) – 3:45
4. "The Race Is On" (Don Rollins) – 3:24
5. "Cumberland Blues" (Garcia, Phil Lesh, Hunter) – 6:26
6. "Box of Rain" (Lesh, Hunter) – 5:34
7. "Row Jimmy" (Garcia, Hunter) – 8:24
8. "Jack Straw" (Bob Weir, Hunter) – 5:16
9. "They Love Each Other" (Garcia, Hunter) – 6:00
10. "Mexicali Blues" (Weir, John Perry Barlow) – 3:58
11. "Tennessee Jed" (Garcia, Hunter) – 8:12
12. "Looks Like Rain" (Weir, Barlow) – 7:58
13. "Wave That Flag" (Garcia, Hunter) – 6:19
14. "El Paso" (Marty Robbins) – 4:19

Disc 2

1. "Here Comes Sunshine" (Garcia, Hunter) – 9:14
2. "Me and Bobby McGee" (Kris Kristofferson, Fred Foster) – 5:45
3. "Loser" (Garcia, Hunter) – 7:03
4. "Playing in the Band" (Weir, Mickey Hart, Hunter) – 19:23

Second set:

5. "Promised Land" (Chuck Berry) – 3:22
6. "China Cat Sunflower" > (Garcia, Hunter) – 8:05
7. "I Know You Rider" (traditional, arranged by Grateful Dead) – 5:51
8. "Big River" (Johnny Cash) – 4:41
9. "Stella Blue" (Garcia, Hunter) – 7:44
10. "Me and My Uncle" (John Phillips) – 3:12

Disc 3

1. "He's Gone" > (Garcia, Hunter) – 13:52
2. "Truckin'" > (Garcia, Lesh, Weir, Hunter) – 10:04
3. "Jam" > (Grateful Dead) – 22:30
4. "Dark Star" > (Garcia, Hart, Bill Kreutzmann, Lesh, Ron "Pigpen" McKernan, Weir, Hunter) – 4:10
5. "Sing Me Back Home" > (Merle Haggard) – 10:03
6. "Sugar Magnolia" (Weir, Hunter) – 9:43

Encore:

7. "Johnny B. Goode" (Berry) – 3:55

== Personnel ==
Grateful Dead

- Jerry Garcia – guitar, vocals
- Donna Jean Godchaux – vocals
- Keith Godchaux – keyboards
- Bill Kreutzmann – drums
- Phil Lesh – bass, vocals
- Bob Weir – guitar, vocals

Production

- Produced by Grateful Dead
- Produced for release by David Lemieux
- Associate Producers: Ivette Ramos & Doran Tyson
- Mastering: Jeffrey Norman
- Recording: Rex Jackson, Kidd Candelario
- Art direction, design: Steve Vance
- Cover art: Tyler Crook
- Photos: E.E. Stern

== Charts ==
| Chart (2019) | Peak position |
|---|---|
| US Billboard 200 | 22 |
| US Top Rock Albums (Billboard) | 1 |
