= Bob Dylan and the Grateful Dead 1987 Tour =

1987 concert tour by Bob Dylan and the Grateful Dead

- Tour by Bob Dylan & Grateful Dead
- Poster to the concert in Oakland
- Location: North America
- Start date: July 4, 1987
- End date: July 26, 1987
- Legs: 1
- No. of shows: 6
- Attendance: 344,968
- Box office: $7.063 million ($20.02 million in 2025 dollars)
Bob Dylan tour chronology
True Confessions Tour (1986)	Dylan & the Dead Tour (1987)	Temples in Flames Tour (1987)
Grateful Dead tour chronology
1987 Summer Tour (June 12 – July 2, July 6–8, August 11 – 23, 1987)	Dylan & the Dead Tour (July 4 & July 10–26, 1987)	1987 Fall Tour (September 30 – October 4, 1987)

The Bob Dylan and the Grateful Dead 1987 Tour was a concert tour by Bob Dylan and the Grateful Dead taking place in the summer of 1987 and consisting of six concerts. Each concert began with one or two lengthy sets by the Grateful Dead of their own material (sometime broken into a first and second set, per the Dead's usual practice), followed by a roughly 90-minute set of the Dead acting as Dylan's backup band.

== Tour dates ==
List of tour dates with date, city, country, venue, attendance, gross, references
Date (1987)	City	Country	Venue	Attendance	Gross	Ref(s)
July 4	Foxborough	United States	Sullivan Stadium	61,000 / 61,000	$1,266,111	
July 10	Philadelphia	United States	John F. Kennedy Stadium	71,097 / 90,000	$1,493,037	
July 12	East Rutherford	United States	Giants Stadium	71,598 / 71,598	$1,478,350	
July 19	Eugene	United States	Autzen Stadium	40,470 / 40,470	$809,400	
July 24	Oakland	United States	Oakland–Alameda County Coliseum	53,354 / 55,000	$1,067,800	
July 26	Anaheim	United States	Anaheim Stadium	47,449 / 50,000	$948,980	
TOTAL				344,968 / 368,068 (94%)	$7,063,679	

== Personnel ==
- Bob Dylan — vocals, guitar
- Jerry Garcia — lead guitar, backing vocals
- Bob Weir — guitar, backing vocals
- Brent Mydland — keyboards, backing vocals
- Phil Lesh — bass, backing vocals
- Mickey Hart — drums
- Bill Kreutzmann —drums

== Recordings ==
Dylan & the Dead is a live album released by Bob Dylan and the Grateful Dead in February 1989 by Columbia Records. It consists of seven songs written and sung by Dylan, with the Dead providing accompaniment taken from the Dylan and the Grateful Dead 1987 Tour. The Grateful Dead's July 24 and 26 performances were released on the 2003 album View from the Vault, Volume Four, while their July 12 performance was released on 2019's Giants Stadium 1987, 1989, 1991.
