= Never Ending Tour 1988 =

1988 concert tour by Bob Dylan

- Tour by Bob Dylan
- Poster to the concert in Cuyahoga Falls, USA
- Start date: June 7, 1988
- End date: October 19, 1988
- Legs: 3
- No. of shows: 71

Bob Dylan concert chronology
- Temples in Flames Tour (1987); Never Ending Tour (1988); Never Ending Tour (1989)

The Never Ending Tour is the popular name for Bob Dylan's endless touring schedule since June 7, 1988.

== Background ==
On the first year of the tour he performed 71 concerts. This is the second fewest performances on a 'Never Ending Tour' yearly tour. The 1988 tour stayed within North America, performing 63 concerts in the United States and eight in Canada. He performed in 29 states in the US and six provinces in Canada.

== Set list ==
This set list is representative of the performance on October 16, 1988 in New York City. It does not represent the set list at all concerts for the duration of the tour.

1. "Subterranean Homesick Blues"
2. "I'll Remember You"
3. "John Brown"
4. "Stuck Inside of Mobile with the Memphis Blues Again
5. "Simple Twist of Fate"
6. "Bob Dylan's 115th Dream"
7. "Highway 61 Revisited"
8. "Gates of Eden"
9. "With God on Our Side"
10. "One Too Many Mornings"
11. "Silvio"
12. "In the Garden"
13. "Like a Rolling Stone"

Encore

14. "The Wagoner's Lad"
15. "The Times They Are a-Changin'"
16. "All Along the Watchtower"

== Tour dates ==
Date	City	Country	Venue	Attendance	Box Office
Interstate 88
June 7, 1988	Concord	United States	Concord Pavilion	—	—
June 9, 1988	Sacramento	United States	Cal Expo Amphitheatre	—	—
June 10, 1988	Berkeley	United States	Hearst Greek Theatre	—	—
June 11, 1988	Mountain View	United States	Shoreline Amphitheatre	—	—
June 13, 1988	Salt Lake City	United States	Park West	—	—
June 15, 1988	Greenwood Village	United States	Fiddler's Green Amphitheatre	—	—
June 17, 1988	St. Louis	United States	The Muny	—	—
June 18, 1988	East Troy	United States	Alpine Valley Music Theatre	12,471 / 20,000	$221,203
June 21, 1988	Cuyahoga Falls	United States	Blossom Music Center	—	—
June 22, 1988	Cincinnati	United States	Riverbend Music Center	—	—
June 24, 1988	Holmdel	United States	Garden State Arts Center	15,166 / 18,000	$275,210
June 25, 1988	Holmdel	United States	Garden State Arts Center	15,166 / 18,000	$275,210
June 26, 1988	Saratoga Springs	United States	Saratoga Performing Arts Center	—	—
June 28, 1988	Hopewell	United States	Finger Lakes Performing Arts Center	—	—
June 30, 1988	Wantagh	United States	Jones Beach Marine Theater	18,000 / 20,000	$360,000
July 1, 1988	Wantagh	United States	Jones Beach Marine Theater	18,000 / 20,000	$360,000
July 2, 1988	Mansfield	United States	Great Woods Performing Arts Center	—	—
July 3, 1988	Old Orchard Beach	United States	The Ballpark	—	—
July 6, 1988	Philadelphia	United States	Mann Music Center	9,396 / 13,200	$147,787
July 8, 1988	Montreal	Canada	Montreal Forum	—	—
July 9, 1988	Ottawa	Canada	Ottawa Civic Centre	—	—
July 11, 1988	Hamilton	Canada	Copps Coliseum	8,639 / 11,210	$151,310
July 13, 1988	Charlevoix	United States	Castle Farms Music Theatre	—	—
July 14, 1988	Hoffman Estates	United States	Poplar Creek Music Theater	—	—
July 15, 1988 (Note: The July 15, 1988 concert in Indianapolis, Indiana was part of the Indiana State Fair.)	Indianapolis	United States	Indiana State Fairground Grandstand	—	—
July 17, 1988	Rochester	United States	Meadow Brook Music Theatre	—	—
July 18, 1988	Rochester	United States	Meadow Brook Music Theatre	—	—
July 20, 1988	Columbia	United States	Merriweather Post Pavilion	—	—
July 22, 1988	Nashville	United States	Starwood Amphitheatre	—	—
July 24, 1988	Atlanta	United States	Chastain Park Amphitheatre	12,706 / 12,706	$253,716
July 25, 1988	Atlanta	United States	Chastain Park Amphitheatre	12,706 / 12,706	$253,716
July 26, 1988	Memphis	United States	Mud Island Amphitheatre	—	—
July 28, 1988	Dallas	United States	Coca-Cola Starplex Amphitheatre	—	—
July 30, 1988	Mesa	United States	Mesa Amphitheatre	—	—
July 31, 1988	Costa Mesa	United States	Pacific Amphitheatre	—	—
August 2, 1988	Los Angeles	United States	Greek Theatre	—	—
August 3, 1988	Los Angeles	United States	Greek Theatre	—	—
August 4, 1988	Los Angeles	United States	Greek Theatre	—	—
August 6, 1988	Carlsbad	United States	Sammis Pavilion	—	—
August 7, 1988	Santa Barbara	United States	Santa Barbara Bowl	—	—
August 19, 1988	Portland	United States	Portland Civic Auditorium	—	—
August 20, 1988	George	United States	Champs de Brionne Music Theatre	—	—
August 21, 1988	Vancouver	Canada	Pacific Coliseum	8,320 / 10,000	$173,752
August 23, 1988	Calgary	Canada	Olympic Saddledome	12,893 / 12,893	$270,551
August 24, 1988	Edmonton	Canada	Northlands Coliseum	9,819 / 10,000	$204,722
August 26, 1988	Winnipeg	Canada	Winnipeg Arena	—	—
August 29, 1988	Toronto	Canada	CNE Grandstand	9,551 / 12,000	$192,519
August 31, 1988 (Note: The August 31, 1988 concert in Syracuse, New York was part of the Great New York State Fair.)	Syracuse	United States	New York State Fairground Grandstand	—	—
September 2, 1988 (Note: The September 2, 1988 concert in Middletown, New York was part of the Orange County Fair.)	Middletown	United States	Orange County Fairgrounds	—	—
September 3, 1988	Manchester	United States	Riverfront Park	—	—
September 4, 1988	Bristol	United States	Lake Compounce	—	—
September 7, 1988	Essex Junction	United States	The Champlain Valley Expo	—	—
September 8, 1988	Binghamton	United States	Broome County Veterans Memorial Arena	—	—
September 10, 1988	Stanhope	United States	Waterloo Village	—	—
September 11, 1988	Fairfax	United States	Patriot Center	—	—
September 13, 1988	Pittsburgh	United States	Pittsburgh Civic Arena	—	—
September 15, 1988	Chapel Hill	United States	Dean Smith Center	—	—
September 16, 1988	Columbia	United States	Carolina Coliseum	—	—
September 17, 1988	Charlotte	United States	Charlotte Coliseum	—	—
September 18, 1988	Knoxville	United States	Thompson–Boling Arena	—	—
September 19, 1988	Charlottesville	United States	University Hall	—	—
September 22, 1988	Tampa	United States	USF Sun Dome	—	—
September 23, 1988	Miami	United States	Miami Arena	—	—
September 24, 1988	Gainesville	United States	O'Connell Center	—	—
September 25, 1988	New Orleans	United States	Hibernia Pavilion	—	—
October 13, 1988	Upper Darby Township	United States	Tower Theater	—	—
October 14, 1988	Upper Darby Township	United States	Tower Theater	—	—
October 16, 1988	New York City	United States	Radio City Music Hall	23,025 / 23,496	$549,303
October 17, 1988	New York City	United States	Radio City Music Hall	23,025 / 23,496	$549,303
October 18, 1988	New York City	United States	Radio City Music Hall	23,025 / 23,496	$549,303
October 19, 1988	New York City	United States	Radio City Music Hall	23,025 / 23,496	$549,303

== Personnel ==
- Bob Dylan: Vocals, guitar and harmonica
- G. E. Smith: Guitar and backing vocals
- Kenny Aaronson: Bass
- Chris Parker: Drums
Special guests

Neil Young

- June 7, 1988: Guitar on ten songs
- June 10, 1988: Guitar on six songs
- June 11, 1988: Guitar on six songs

Joe Walsh

- July 26, 1988: Guitar on two songs

Joe Walsh

- July 26, 1988: Guitar on two songs

The Alarm

- August 4, 1988: Mike Peters (shared vocals), Dave Sharp (guitar) and Eddie McDonald & Nigel Twist (backing vocals) on one song.
- August 7, 1988: Mike Peters (shared vocals), Dave Sharp (guitar) and Eddie McDonald & Nigel Twist (backing vocals) on one song.

Tracy Chapman

- August 21, 1988: Co-vocals on one song
- August 23, 1988: Co-vocals on one song
- August 24, 1988: Co-vocals on one song

Doug Sahm

- August 24, 1988: Lead vocals on one song
