= She's My Baby (Traveling Wilburys song) =

Single by Traveling Wilburys

from the album Traveling Wilburys Vol. 3
- B-side: "New Blue Moon" (instrumental), "Runaway"
- Released: November 5, 1990
- Genre: Hard rock; garage rock
- Length: 3:14
- Label: Wilbury
- Songwriters: George Harrison; Jeff Lynne; Bob Dylan; Tom Petty
- Producers: Spike Wilbury; Clayton Wilbury

Traveling Wilburys singles chronology
"Nobody's Child" (1990)	"She's My Baby" (1990)	"Inside Out" (1991)

"She's My Baby" is a song by the British–American supergroup the Traveling Wilburys and the opening track of their 1990 album Traveling Wilburys Vol. 3. The song was written by all four members of the band – George Harrison, Jeff Lynne, Bob Dylan and Tom Petty – and each of them sing a portion of the track. The song was released as the first single from the album, although it was only issued as a promotional single in the United States. The lead guitar part is played by Gary Moore.

The band filmed a music video for the single, which was directed by David Leland and produced by Limelight Films. The clip shows the four Wilburys and drummer Jim Keltner performing the track and a snippet of Dylan riding a bike on the set. The single peaked at number 2 on the Billboard Album Rock Tracks chart peaking there for three weeks behind "Concrete and Steel" by ZZ Top for a week, followed by "Hard to Handle" by the Black Crowes for two additional weeks.

== Track listings ==
- 7" W9523 / 054391952370, Cassette W9523C / 054391944344
1. "She's My Baby"
2. "New Blue Moon" (instrumental)
- CD W9523CD / 075992179928, 12" W9523T / 075992179904
1. "She's My Baby"
2. "New Blue Moon" (instrumental)
3. "Runaway"

== Personnel ==
- Spike Wilbury (George Harrison) – joint lead vocal and acoustic rhythm guitar
- Clayton Wilbury (Jeff Lynne) – joint lead vocal, electric rhythm guitar and bass
- Boo Wilbury (Bob Dylan) – joint lead vocal, acoustic rhythm guitar
- Muddy Wilbury (Tom Petty) – joint lead vocal, electric rhythm guitar

Additional musicians

- Buster Sidebury (Jim Keltner) – drums
- Ken Wilbury (Gary Moore) – lead guitar
- Jim Horn – saxophone
- Ray Cooper – cowbell

== Charts ==
Chart performance for "She's My Baby"
Chart (1990)	Peak position
Australia (ARIA)	58
UK Singles (Official Charts)	79
