= Nobody's Child: Romanian Angel Appeal =

1990 compilation album by various artists

Compilation album by Various Artists
- Released: 23 July 1990
- Recorded: 1976−90
- Genre: Rock
- Length: 1:03:48
- Label: Warner Bros.
- Compiler: George Harrison

Professional ratings
Review scores
Source	Rating
AllMusic	3/5 stars
Entertainment Weekly	B
Select	2/5 medals

Nobody's Child: Romanian Angel Appeal is a charity album released in July 1990 to benefit Romanian orphans, under the auspices of the Romanian Angel Appeal Foundation. It was compiled by English rock musician George Harrison in response to concerns raised by his wife Olivia Harrison, who had visited Romania and witnessed the suffering in the country's abandoned state orphanages following the fall of Communism. The release was preceded by a single, "Nobody's Child", recorded by Harrison's band the Traveling Wilburys. Other artists who donated songs to the album include Stevie Wonder, Paul Simon, Eric Clapton, Duane Eddy, Van Morrison, Guns N' Roses, Ringo Starr, Ric Ocasek and Elton John. Many of the recordings were previously unreleased.

The Romanian Angel Appeal marked a rare foray into the media spotlight by Olivia Harrison, who created the foundation with support from the other wives of the former Beatles – Barbara Bach, Yoko Ono and Linda McCartney. She and her husband promoted the project in the UK with appearances on the television talk show Wogan and in the one-hour Radio 1 documentary Nobody's Child. The album was released by Harrison's record company, Warner Bros. Records, on 23 July 1990. It was preceded by a launch at London's Hyde Park Hotel on 22 July, attended by the Harrisons, and Bach and Starr. The video for the "Nobody's Child" single included animated scenes and footage of the Romanian orphanages.

== Song selection ==
George Harrison's involvement in the project reprised his role in assisting refugees of the 1971 Bangladesh Liberation War, when he staged an all-star benefit concert and oversaw the release of an associated album and documentary film. Aside from the title track, his presence on Nobody's Child was reflected in the recordings submitted by Simon, Clapton and Eddy.

Harrison said in compiling Nobody's Child he was conscious of not making it his album by dominating the content. He said that his request for a live track from Bruce Springsteen went unanswered, and his approach to Michael Jackson became confused in the acrimony taking place between Jackson and Paul McCartney over the ownership of the Beatles' Northern Songs catalogue. Selections by Steve Winwood and Queen arrived too late for inclusion on the album.

== Track listing ==
No.	Title	Writer(s)	Artist	Length
1.	"Nobody's Child"	Cy Coben, Mel Foree	Traveling Wilburys	3:27
2.	"Wonderful Remark" (From the soundtrack to The King of Comedy)	Van Morrison	Van Morrison	3:58
3.	"Medicine Man" (B-side to You Gotta Love Someone single)	Elton John, Bernie Taupin	Elton John	4:24
4.	"This Week"	David A. Stewart	Dave Stewart and the Spiritual Cowboys	3:03
5.	"Homeward Bound" (Performed live on Saturday Night Live, 20 November 1976)	Paul Simon	Paul Simon & George Harrison	2:38
6.	"How Can You Mend a Broken Heart?" (Recorded live on November 17 & 18, 1989 National Tennis Centre, Melbourne, Australia)	Barry Gibb, Robin Gibb	Bee Gees	3:30
7.	"Lovechild"	Billy Idol	Billy Idol	5:40
8.	"Big Day Little Boat"	Edie Brickell	Edie Brickell & New Bohemians	3:34
9.	"Feeding Off the Love of the Land"	Stevie Wonder	Stevie Wonder	5:54
10.	"That Kind of Woman"	George Harrison	Eric Clapton	3:56
11.	"Goodnight Little One"	Ric Ocasek	Ric Ocasek	5:36
12.	"The Trembler"	Ravi Shankar, Duane Eddy	Duane Eddy	3:31
13.	"Ain't That Peculiar" (Performed live on Late Night with David Letterman, April 6, 1989)	William "Smokey" Robinson, Pete Moore, Marv Tarplin, Bobby Rogers	Mike & the Mechanics with Paul Shaffer and The World's Most Dangerous Band	3:23
14.	"Civil War"	Slash, W. Axl Rose, Duff McKagan	Guns N' Roses	7:36
15.	"With a Little Help from My Friends" (Recorded live at The Greek Theatre, Los Angeles, CA, September 3 & 4, 1989)	Lennon–McCartney	Ringo Starr and His All-Starr Band	3:41

=== Vinyl and cassette releases ===
Side one

1. "Nobody's Child"
2. "Wonderful Remark"
3. "Medicine Man"
4. "This Week"
5. "Homeward Bound"
6. "How Can You Mend a Broken Heart?"
7. "Lovechild"
8. "Big Day Little Boat"

Side two

1. "Feeding Off the Love of the Land"
2. "That Kind of Woman"
3. "Goodnight Little One"
4. "The Trembler"
5. "Ain't That Peculiar"
6. "Civil War"

== Notes ==
- On the included performance of "With a Little Help from My Friends", the All-Starr Band consisted of Ringo Starr, Joe Walsh, Nils Lofgren, Billy Preston, Dr. John, Levon Helm, Rick Danko, Garth Hudson, Jim Keltner, Clarence Clemons and Zak Starkey. The song is only on the CD version of the album.
- Aside from his contributions with the Traveling Wilburys and Paul Simon, George Harrison plays guitar on the tracks by Eric Clapton and Duane Eddy.
