= Temples in Flames Tour =

1987 concert tour by Bob Dylan

- Tour by Bob Dylan
- Poster to the concerts in Birmingham, UK
- Location: Europe; Asia
- Start date: September 5, 1987
- End date: October 17, 1987
- Legs: 1
- No. of shows: 30

Bob Dylan concert chronology
- Bob Dylan and the Grateful Dead 1987 Tour (1987); Temples in Flames Tour (1987); Never Ending Tour 1988 (1988)

The Temples in Flames Tour was a concert tour by Bob Dylan. He was supported on the tour by Tom Petty and the Heartbreakers. The tour started with two concerts in Israel and covered various European countries, culminating in four concerts at Wembley Arena in London, England.

Roger McGuinn was the opening act for this tour (who was also supported by Tom Petty and the Heartbreakers).

This was the last time that Dylan toured with Petty, and the last tour before he began the Never Ending Tour. Dylan and Petty briefly united in Holmdel, New Jersey in the summer of 2003. Dylan would also reunite with Mike Campbell and Benmont Tench of the Heartbreakers at Farm Aid, on September 23, 2023.

== Tour dates ==
Date	City	Country	Venue
Asia
September 5, 1987	Tel Aviv	Israel	Yarkon Park
September 7, 1987	Jerusalem	Israel	Sultan's Pool
Europe
September 10, 1987	Basel	Switzerland	St. Jakobshalle
September 12, 1987	Modena	Italy	Area Ex Autodromo
September 13, 1987	Turin	Italy	Turin Palasport
September 15, 1987	Dortmund	West Germany	Westfalenhallen
September 16, 1987	Nuremberg	West Germany	Frankenhalle
September 17, 1987	East Berlin	East Germany	Treptower Park
September 19, 1987	Rotterdam	Netherlands	Rotterdam Ahoy Sportpaleis
September 20, 1987	Hanover	West Germany	Hannover Messehalle
September 21, 1987	Copenhagen	Denmark	Valby-Hallen
September 23, 1987	Helsinki	Finland	Helsinki Jäähalli
September 25, 1987	Gothenburg	Sweden	Scandinavium
September 26, 1987	Stockholm	Sweden	Johanneshovs Isstadion
September 28, 1987	Frankfurt	West Germany	Festhalle Frankfurt
September 29, 1987	Stuttgart	West Germany	Hanns-Martin-Schleyer-Halle
September 30, 1987	Munich	West Germany	Olympiahalle
October 1, 1987	Verona	Italy	Verona Arena
October 3, 1987	Rome	Italy	Roma Palaeur
October 4, 1987	Milan	Italy	Arena Civica di Milano
October 5, 1987	Locarno	Switzerland	Piazza Grande
October 7, 1987	Paris	France	Palais Omnisports de Paris-Bercy
October 8, 1987	Brussels	Belgium	Forest National
October 10, 1987	Birmingham	England	NEC LG Arena
October 11, 1987	Birmingham	England	NEC LG Arena
October 12, 1987	Birmingham	England	NEC LG Arena
October 14, 1987	London	England	Wembley Arena
October 15, 1987	London	England	Wembley Arena
October 16, 1987	London	England	Wembley Arena
October 17, 1987	London	England	Wembley Arena
