= M.I.7 (album) =

2026 studio album by M.I.A.

Studio album by M.I.A.
- Released: 17 April 2026
- Genre: Gospel
- Length: 64:04
- Label: Ohmni

M.I.A. chronology
| Bells Collection (2023) | M.I.7 (2026) |

Singles from M.I.7
- 1. "Everything" Released: 7 April 2026

M.I.7 is the seventh studio album by the English recording artist M.I.A. It was released on 17 April 2026 on M.I.A's own label Ohmni Music, marking her first album release since 2022. The album was recorded in seven different locations around the world. Conceptually, it draws inspiration from M.I.A.'s Christian faith and is built around references to the Book of Revelation, the final book of the Bible. M.I.A.'s mother Kala and the Sunday Service Choir appear as guests on the album. The album received mixed reviews.

== Background ==
M.I.A. released her sixth album, Mata, in October 2022. Over the subsequent four years, she devoted much of her time to launching a clothing line which she contended could block electromagnetic waves such as 5G signals, which she erroneously perceived as harmful. Her only musical releases during the period were a free mixtape entitled Bells Collection in 2023 and the standalone track "Armour" in 2025.

According to M.I.A., the concept for the M.I.7 album "emerged as a vision that revealed itself before the recording process began, which demanded to be followed." The album features seven songs each written over seven days in a different location. (Note: The seven songs exclude the trumpet interludes and the final silent track. "Jesus" and "Sacred Heart" are considered to be two parts of a single song.) It was written and recorded in Ethiopia, Egypt, India, the United Kingdom, Greece, Australia, and the United States. Some of the writing and production occurred at the California-based Shangri-La recording studio of the American producer Rick Rubin.

== Music and lyrics ==
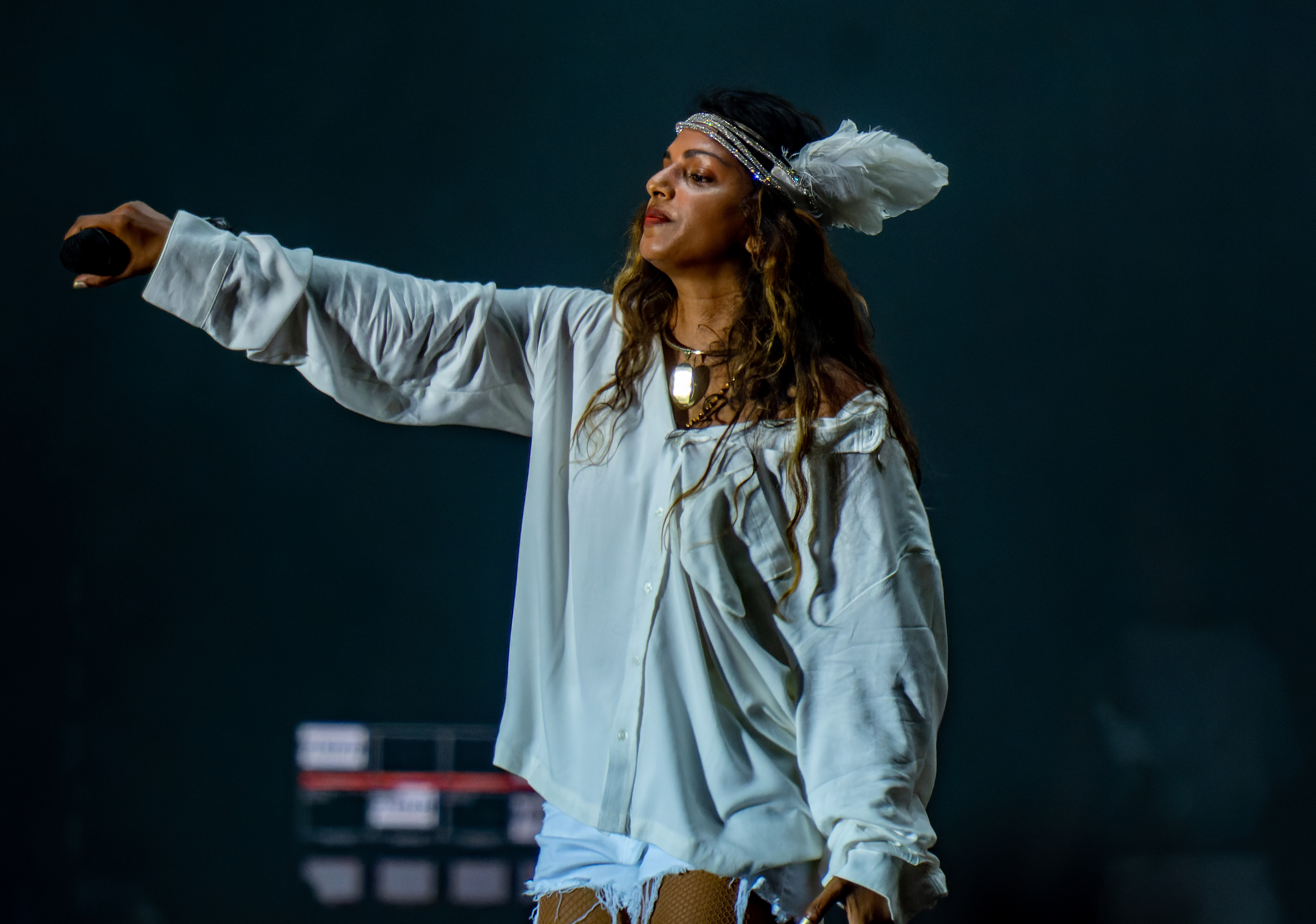
M.I.A. performing in 2022

M.I.7 is generally categorised as a gospel album because of the references to Christianity throughout. M.I.A. had announced in 2022 that she had become a born-again Christian five years earlier. The album's structure was inspired by the seven trumpets and seven seals referenced in the Book of Revelation, the final book of the Bible. The final track, "30 Minutes of Silence", contains no sound for just under half an hour, reflecting the reference in Revelation to there being "silence in heaven for about half an hour" after the opening of the seventh seal.

The first full-length track, "Prayer 777", mixes a breakbeat with strings. "Money" combines Asian and Afrobeat sounds; lyrically it focuses both on financial and spiritual wealth. "Sacred Heart" features M.I.A.'s mother, Kala, singing a Tamil Christian hymn; M.I.A.'s son Ikhyd also appears on the track, playing the tambourine. The tracks "Jesus" and "Calling" feature vocals from the Sunday Service Choir. "Everything" was described by Liberty Dunworth of the NME as "uplifting" and "centred around a high-energy club theme".

== Release and promotion ==
The surprise release of M.I.7 was announced on 7 April 2026; the lead single "Everything" was released on the same day. The album was released nine days later via M.I.A's own label Ohmni Music. In addition to being made available digitally, it was released as a limited edition boxed set of seven 7-inch vinyl records. The artwork for the album's digital release depicts M.I.A. in a gold garment with the hood partially obscuring her face; seven circular symbols are overlaid on the photograph.

M.I.A. joined Major Lazer onstage at the Coachella 2026 festival shortly after the release of M.I.7 to perform her 2007 song "Paper Planes". Earlier in the year, she had been announced as an opener for Kid Cudi's spring 2026 Rebel Ragers tour. During her 2 May set in Dallas, M.I.A. was booed after making a comment about potential illegal immigrants in the audience. On 4 May, Kid Cudi removed M.I.A. from the tour, saying "I won't have someone on my tour making offensive remarks that upsets my fanbase."

== Critical reception ==
Professional ratings
Review scores
| Source | Rating |
|---|---|
| And It Don't Stop | (2-star Honorable Mention) |
| Pitchfork | 7.4/10 |
| Premier Christianity | 2.5/5 stars |
| Slant Magazine | 2.5/5 stars |

Writing for Pitchfork, Chal Ravens gave the album a rating of 7.4, describing it as "an emotional and ecstatic testament to personal salvation". George Luke of Premier Christianity called the album "uplifting, worshipful, thought-provoking, just plain weird" and gave it 2.5 stars out of 5. Slant Magazine's Paul Attard wrote that "while M.I.7 positions itself at the threshold of some spiritual unveiling, the actual music rarely bears it out", criticising the album's lack of lyrical depth and unsatisfying production choices.

== Track listing ==
All track titles are stylised in capital letters. Credits adapted from Apple Music

| No. | Title | Writer(s) | Producer(s) | Length |
|---|---|---|---|---|
| 1. | "Trumpet 1" | Mathangi Arulpragasam; Thom Bridges; Kurtis Wells | Boaz van de Beatz; Bridges^{[c]}; Wells^{[c]} | 1:00 |
| 2. | "Prayer 777" | Arulpragasam; Christopher Selfe; Danny Omerhodic; Bridges; Wells | Selfe; Swick^{[v]}; Bridges^{[v]} | 3:45 |
| 3. | "Trumpet 2" | Arulpragasam; Bridges; Wells | Boaz van de Beatz; Bridges^{[c]}; Wells^{[c]} | 0:28 |
| 4. | "Jesus" (featuring Sunday Service Choir) | Arulpragasam; Selfe; Omerhodic | Swick; Selfe^{[c]} | 3:33 |
| 5. | "Sacred Heart" (featuring Kala) | Arulpragasam; Bridges; Wells | Bridges; Wells | 2:51 |
| 6. | "Trumpet 3" | Arulpragasam; Bridges; Wells | Boaz van de Beatz; Bridges^{[c]}; Wells^{[c]} | 0:27 |
| 7. | "Money" | Arulpragasam; Omerhodic | M.I.A.; Swick | 3:22 |
| 8. | "Trumpet 4" | Arulpragasam; Bridges; Wells | Boaz van de Beatz; Bridges^{[c]}; Wells^{[c]} | 0:41 |
| 9. | "Circle" | Arulpragasam; Bridges; Wells; Omerhodic | M.I.A.; Swick; Bridges^{[a]}; Wells | 2:33 |
| 10. | "Trumpet 5" | Arulpragasam; Bridges; Wells | Boaz van de Beatz; Bridges^{[c]}; Wells^{[c]} | 0:47 |
| 11. | "Calling" (featuring Sunday Service Choir) | Arulpragasam; Bridges; Wells | Bridges; Wells; Jason White^{[v]} | 3:40 |
| 12. | "Trumpet 6" | Bridges; Wells; Arulpragasam | Boaz van de Beatz; Bridges^{[c]}; Wells^{[c]} | 0:49 |
| 13. | "Ride the Sky" | Arulpragasam | M.I.A. | 3:00 |
| 14. | "Trumpet 7" | Arulpragasam; Bridges; Wells | Boaz van de Beatz; Bridges^{[c]}; Wells^{[c]} | 0:43 |
| 15. | "Everything" | Arulpragasam; Selfe; Bridges; Wells | M.I.A.; Selfe; Bridges; Wells^{[a]}; Swick^{[a]}^{[v]} | 3:22 |
| 16. | "30 Minutes of Silence" | Arulpragasam; Omerhodic | M.I.A.; Swick | 33:04 |

Notes

- ^{^[a]} signifies an additional producer
- ^{^[c]} signifies a co-producer
- ^{^[v]} signifies a vocal producer
- "30 Minutes of Silence" contains a hidden track that begins at 29:51.

== Personnel ==
Credits adapted from Apple Music

- M.I.A. – vocals, production (tracks 7, 9, 13, 15, 16)
- Thom Bridges – programming
- Kurtis Wells – programming
- Boaz van de Beatz – programming
- Danny Omerhodic – programming, engineering
- Geoff Pesche – mastering
- Ikhyd Bronfman – tambourine (track 5)
