= M.I.A. (rapper) =

British rapper (born 1975)

M.I.A. MBE
- எம்.ஐ.ஏ.
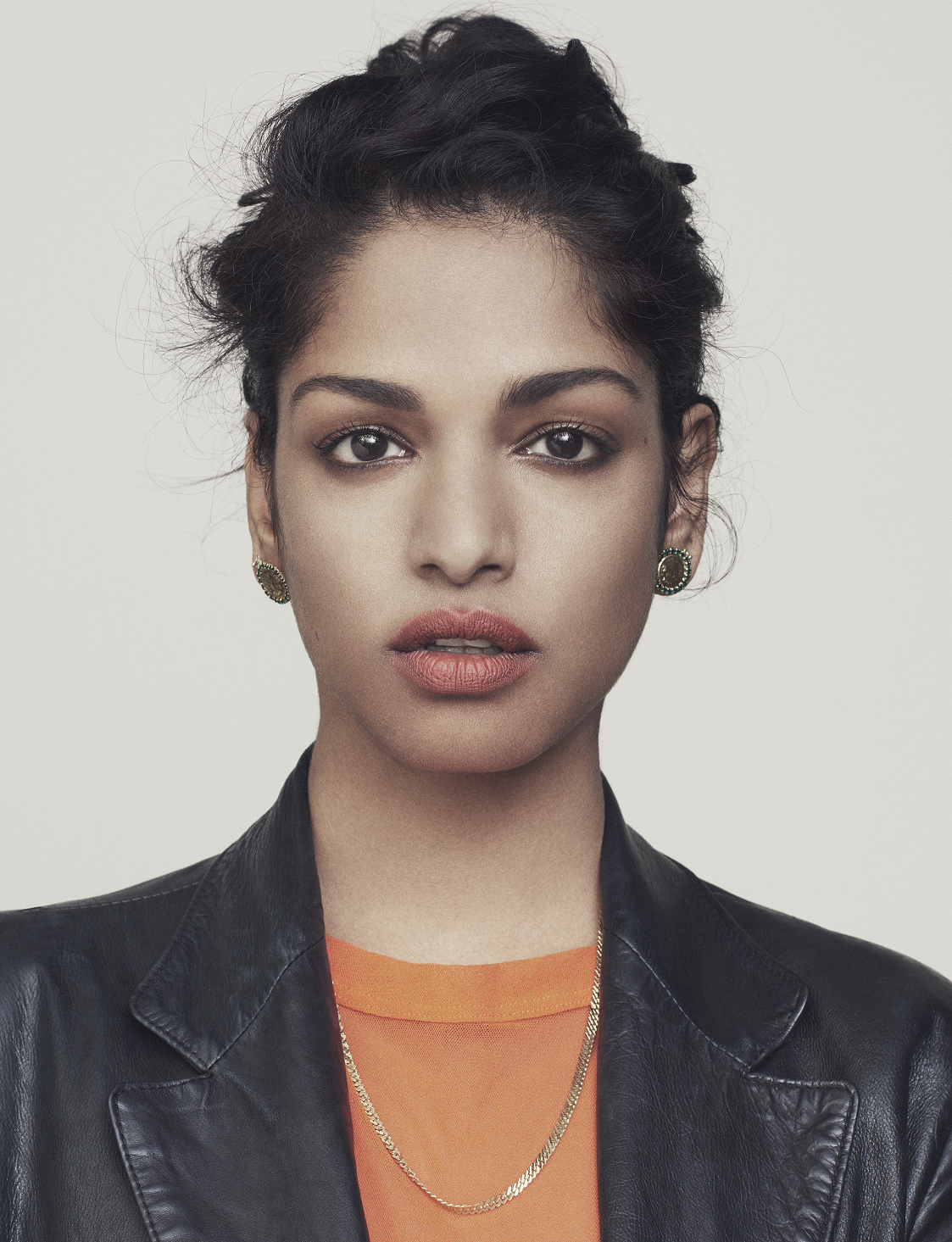
- M.I.A. in 2016
- Born: Mathangi Arulpragasam; 18 July 1975 (age 51); London, England
- Other name: Maya
- Citizenship: United Kingdom; Sri Lanka
- Education: Central Saint Martins, College of Art and Design
- Occupations: Rapper; singer; songwriter; record producer; activist
- Years active: 2000–present
- Partners: Diplo (2003–2008); Benjamin Bronfman (2008–2012)
- Children: 1
- Father: Arul Pragasam
- Relatives: Kali Arulpragasam (sister)
- Awards: Full list
- Musical career
- Genres: Dance; world; hip-hop; pop; progressive rap
- Instrument: Vocals
- Works: M.I.A. discography
- Labels: N.E.E.T.; XL; Mercury; Interscope; Virgin EMI; Showbiz; Polydor; Roc Nation; Island

Mathangi "Maya" Arulpragasam (Tamil: மாதங்கி அருள்பிரகாசம்; born 18 July 1975), known professionally as M.I.A. (Tamil: எம்.ஐ.ஏ.; an initialism for both "Missing in action" and "Missing in Acton"), is a British rapper, singer, songwriter, record producer, and activist. Her music combines elements of alternative, dance, electronic, hip hop and world music with electronic instruments and samples.

Born in London to Sri Lankan Tamil parents, M.I.A. and her family moved to Jaffna in northern Sri Lanka when she was six months old. As a child, she experienced displacement caused by the Sri Lankan Civil War, which made the family return to London as refugees when M.I.A. was 11 years old; the war had a defining influence on M.I.A.'s artistry. She started as a visual artist, filmmaker and designer in 2000, and began her recording career in 2002. One of the first acts to come to public attention through the Internet, she saw early fame as an underground artist in early 2004 with her singles "Sunshowers" and "Galang".

M.I.A.'s first two albums, Arular (2005) and Kala (2007), received widespread critical acclaim for their fusion of hip hop, electronic, and world music influences. The latter's single "Paper Planes" (co-produced by at-the-time partner Diplo) peaked at number four on the US Billboard Hot 100 and received a nomination for the Grammy Award for Record of the Year at the 51st Annual Grammy Awards. Her third album, Maya (2010), was preceded by the single "Born Free" and an accompanying controversial music video/short film. Maya debuted within the top ten of the album charts in the United States, Finland, Norway, Greece and Canada. Her fourth studio album, Matangi (2013), spawned the single "Bad Girls", which won accolades at the MTV Video Music Awards. Her fifth album, AIM (2016), was met with a critical and commercial decline. She guest performed alongside Young Thug on Travis Scott's 2020 single "Franchise", which peaked atop the Billboard Hot 100, and released her sixth studio album Mata (2022) two years later, which spawned the single "The One".

M.I.A.'s accolades include two American Society of Composers, Authors and Publishers (ASCAP) awards and two MTV Video Music Awards. She is the first person of South Asian descent to be nominated for an Academy Award and Grammy Award in the same year. She was named one of the defining artists of the 2000s decade by Rolling Stone, and one of the 100 most influential people of 2009 by Time. Esquire ranked M.I.A. on its list of the 75 most influential people of the 21st century. According to Billboard, she was one of the "Top 50 Dance/Electronic Artists of the 2010s". M.I.A. was appointed Member of the Order of the British Empire (MBE) in the 2019 Birthday Honours for her services to music.

== Life and career ==
=== 1975–1999: Early life ===
M.I.A. was born Mathangi "Maya" Arulpragasam on 18 July 1975, in Hounslow, London. She is the daughter of Arul Pragasam, a Sri Lankan Tamil engineer, writer and activist, and his wife, Kala, a seamstress. M.I.A.'s first name is derived from the Hindu goddess, Matangi. When M.I.A. was six months old, her family moved to Jaffna in northern Sri Lanka, where her brother was born. There, her father adopted the name Arular and became a political activist and founding member of the Eelam Revolutionary Organisation of Students (EROS), a political Tamil group affiliated with the LTTE. The first 11 years of M.I.A.'s life were marked by displacement caused by the Sri Lankan Civil War. Her family went into hiding from the Sri Lankan Army, and she had little contact with her father during this period. She has described her family as living in "big-time" poverty during her childhood but also recalls some of her happiest memories from growing up in Jaffna. She attended Catholic convent schools such as the Holy Family Convent, Jaffna, where she developed her art skills—painting in particular—to work her way up her class.

Due to safety concerns, M.I.A.'s mother moved with her children to Madras in India, where they lived in a derelict house and received sporadic visits from their father, who was introduced to the children as their "uncle" in order to protect them. The family, minus Arular, then resettled in Jaffna temporarily, only to see the war escalate further in northeast Sri Lanka. During this time, the primary school of nine-year-old M.I.A. was destroyed in a government raid.

A week before M.I.A.'s 11th birthday in 1986, she returned with her mother and siblings to London, where they were housed as refugees. Her father arrived on the island and became an independent peace mediator between the two sides of the civil war in the late 1980s–2010. M.I.A. spent the rest of her childhood and teenage years living on the Phipps Bridge Estate in the Mitcham district of south London, where she learned to speak English, while her mother brought the children up on a modest income. M.I.A. entered the final year of primary school in the autumn of 1986 and quickly mastered the English language. Her classmates had difficulty pronouncing her first name so her aunt suggested that she use the nickname "Maya". Hers was one of only two Asian families on the estate at the time, in an atmosphere she has described as "incredibly racist."

While living in England and raising her children, M.I.A.'s mother became a Christian in 1990 and worked as a seamstress for the Royal Family for much of her career. She worked from her home in London's Tooting area. M.I.A. had a difficult relationship with her father, due to his political activities in the 1980s and complete absence during much of her life. Prior to the release of the first album, which M.I.A. had named after her father, he emailed her: "This is Dad. Change the title of your album. I'm really proud. Just read about you in the Sri Lanka Times. Dad." She chose not to change the album title. M.I.A. attended the Ricards Lodge High School in Wimbledon. Following high school, she attended Central Saint Martins, gaining admittance through unconventional means despite not having formally applied, she said "I got the name of the head of the art department and just rang him up every single day." She graduated with a degree in fine art, film and video in 2000.

=== 2000–2002: Visual art and film ===
While attending Central St Martins College, M.I.A. wanted to make films and art depicting realism that would be accessible to everyone, something that she felt was missing from her classmates' ethos and the course criteria. At college, she found the fashion courses "disposable" and more current than the film texts that she studied. She told Arthur magazine "[Students there were] exploring apathy, dressing up in some pigeon outfit, or running around conceptualising ... It missed the whole point of art representing society. Social reality didn't really exist there; it just stopped at theory." She cited "radical cinema" including Harmony Korine, Dogme 95 and Spike Jonze as some of her cinematic inspirations during film school. As a student, she was approached by director John Singleton to work on a film in Los Angeles after he had read a script she had written, though she decided not to take up the offer. For her degree, M.I.A. prepared her departmental honours thesis on the film CB4.

M.I.A. befriended students in the college's fashion, advertising and graphics departments. She met Justine Frischmann, front woman of the British band Elastica, through her friend Damon Albarn at an Air concert in 1999, and Frischmann commissioned M.I.A. to create the cover art for the band's 2000 album, The Menace, and video document their American tour. M.I.A. returned to Jaffna in 2001 to film a documentary on Tamil youth, but was unable to complete the project because she encountered harassment. In 2001, M.I.A.'s first public exhibition of paintings after graduating took place at the Euphoria Shop on London's Portobello Road. It featured graffiti art and spray-paint canvasses mixing Tamil political street art with images of London life and consumerist culture. The show was nominated for an Alternative Turner Prize and a monograph book of the collection was published in 2002, titled M.I.A.. Actor Jude Law was among early buyers of her art.

=== 2003–2005: Musical beginnings and Arular ===
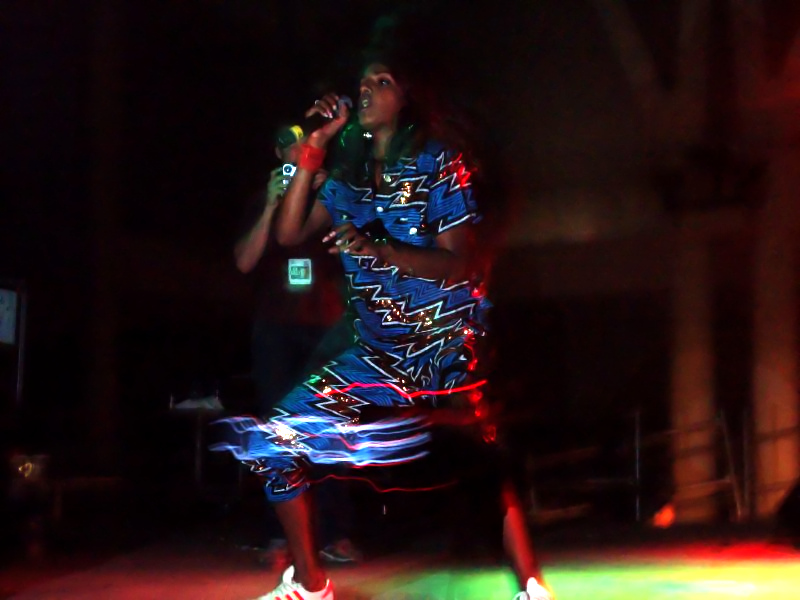
M.I.A. performing at Sónar on her Arular Tour

M.I.A. cites the radio broadcasts she heard emanating from her neighbours' flats in the late 1980s as some of her first exposures to her earliest musical influences. From there, she developed an interest in hip-hop and dancehall, identifying with "the starkness of the sound" in records by Public Enemy, MC Shan and Ultramagnetic MCs; and the "weird, distinct style" of acts such as Silver Bullet and London Posse. In college she developed an affinity for punk and the emerging sounds of Britpop and electroclash. M.I.A. cites The Slits, Malcolm McLaren and The Clash as major influences.

By 2001, M.I.A. designed the cover for Elastica's last single "The Bitch Don't Work", and went on the road with the band to video document their tour. The tour's supporting act, electroclash artist Peaches, introduced M.I.A. to the Roland MC-505 and encouraged her to make music, a medium in which M.I.A. lacked confidence. While holidaying together in Bequia in the Caribbean, M.I.A. began experimenting with Frischmann's MC-505. She adopted her stage name, "M.I.A.", standing for "Missing In Acton" during this time. In her 2012 book she writes, "M.I.A. came to be because of my missing cousin. I wanted to make a film about where he was since he was M.I.A. (Missing in Action) in Sri Lanka. We were the same age, went to the same schools growing up. I was also living in Acton at the time. So I was living in Acton looking for my cousin missing in action." Of her time in Bequia, she said "I started going out to this chicken shed with a sound system. You buy rum through a hatch and dance in the street. They convinced me to come to church where people sing so amazingly. But I couldn't clap along to hallelujah. I was out of rhythm. Someone said, 'What happened to Jesus? I saw you dancing last night and you were totally fine.' They stopped the service and taught me to clap in time. It was embarrassing". Returning to West London, where she shared an apartment with Frischmann, she began working with a simple set-up (a second-hand 4-track tape machine, the MC-505, and a radio microphone), composing and recording a six-song demo tape that included "Lady Killa", "M.I.A.", and "Galang".

In 2003, the independent label Showbiz Records pressed 500 vinyl singles of "Galang", a mix of dancehall, electro, jungle, and world music, with Seattle Weekly praising its a cappella coda as a "lift-up-and-over moment" evoking "clear skies beyond the council flats." File sharing, college radio airplay, and the rise in popularity of "Galang" and "Sunshowers" in dance clubs and fashion shows made M.I.A. an underground sensation. M.I.A. has been heralded as one of the first artists to build a large fanbase exclusively via these channels and as someone who could be studied to re-examine the internet's impact on how listeners are exposed to new music. She began uploading her music onto her MySpace account in June 2004. Major record labels caught on to the popularity of the second song she has written, "Galang", and M.I.A. was eventually signed to XL Recordings in mid-2004. Her debut album, to be titled Arular, was finalised by borrowing studio time.

M.I.A.'s next single, "Sunshowers", released on 5 July 2004, and its B-side ("Fire Fire") described guerrilla warfare and asylum seeking, merging ambiguous references to violence and religious persecution with black and white forms of dissidence. These themes inspired her treatment for the music video, the first she wrote. It was filmed in the jungles of South India, which she has described as her favourite. "Galang" was re-released in 2004. In September 2004, M.I.A. was first featured on the cover of the publication The FADER, in its 24th issue. The music video for "Galang" made in November of that year showed multiple M.I.A.s against a backdrop of militaristic animated graffiti, and depicted scenes of urban Britain and war that influenced her art direction for it. Both singles appeared on international publications' "Best of the Year" lists and subsequently "Best of the Decade" lists. The songs "Pull Up the People", "Bucky Done Gun" and "" were released as 12-inch singles and CDs by XL Recordings, which along with the non-label mashup mixtape of Arular tracks, Piracy Funds Terrorism, were distributed in 2004 to positive critical acclaim.

M.I.A. made her North American live debut in February 2005 in Toronto where concertgoers already knew many of her songs. In March 2005, M.I.A.'s debut album Arular was released worldwide to critical acclaim after several months delay. The album title is the nom de guerre that M.I.A.'s father took when he joined the Tamil independence movement, and many of the songs acknowledge her and her father's experiences in Jaffna. While making Arular in her bedroom in west London, she built tracks off her demos, using beats she programmed on the Roland MC-505. The album experiments with bold, jarring and ambient sounds, and its lyrics address the Iraq War and daily life in London as well as M.I.A.'s past.

"Galang", "Sunshowers", "Hombre" and the funk carioca-inspired co-composition "Bucky Done Gun" were released as singles from Arular. The release of the latter marked the first time that a funk carioca-inspired song was played on mainstream radio and music television in Brazil, its country of origin. M.I.A. worked with one of her musical influences Missy Elliott, contributing to the track "Bad Man" on her 2005 album The Cookbook. Despite initial fears that her dyslexia might pose problems while touring, M.I.A. supported the album through a series of festival and club shows, including the Bue Festival in Buenos Aires, a free headlining show at Central Park Summerstage, the Summer Sonic Fest and the Coachella Valley Music and Arts Festival, where she played an encore in response to crowd enthusiasm, a rare occurrence for the festival generally and the first encore following a tent performance at Coachella. She also toured with Roots Manuva and LCD Soundsystem, and ended 2005 briefly touring with Gwen Stefani and performing at the Big Day Out festival. On 19 July 2005, M.I.A. was shortlisted for the Mercury Music Prize for Arular. According to the music review aggregation Metacritic, it garnered an average score of 88 out of 100, described as "universal acclaim". They reported in 2010 that Arular was the seventh best reviewed album of 2005 and the ninth Best-Reviewed Electronic/Dance Album on Metacritic of the 2000–09 decade. Arular became the second most featured album in music critics' Year-End Top 10 lists for 2005 and was named best of the year by publications such as Blender, Stylus and Musikbyrån.

=== 2006–2008: Kala and world recognition ===
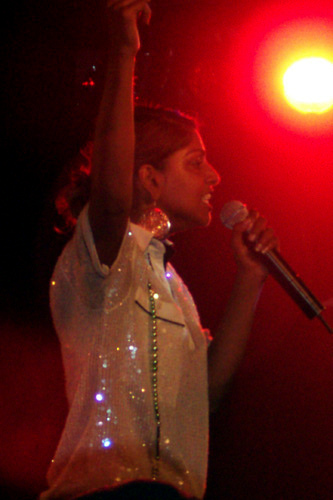
M.I.A. performing at the Prince in Melbourne in February 2006

In 2006, M.I.A. recorded her second studio album Kala, this time named after her mother. Due to visa complications in the United States, the album was recorded in a variety of locations — India, Trinidad, Liberia, Jamaica, Australia, Japan, and the UK. Eventually the album was completed in the US.

Kala featured live instrumentation and layers of traditional dance and folk styles such as soca and the urumee drum of gaana, rave music and bootleg soundtracks of Tamil film music, incorporating new styles into her avant-garde electronic dance music. The songs, artwork and fashion of Kala have been characterised as simultaneously celebratory and infused with raw, "darker, outsider" themes, such as immigration politics, personal relationships and war. In February 2007, the first track from the album to be made available to the public was "Bird Flu", which was posted with an accompanying music video to her MySpace. Later that year, M.I.A. featured in the song "Come Around", a bonus track on Timbaland's 2007 album Shock Value and a track on Kala. The album's first official single "Boyz" was released in June 2007, accompanied by a music video co-directed by Jay Will and M.I.A., becoming M.I.A.'s first top ten charting song. The single "Jimmy", written about an invitation to tour genocide-affected regions in Rwanda that the singer received from a journalist while staying in Liberia, was released next. The single "Paper Planes", described a "satire on immigrant stereotypes", and the EP Paper Planes – Homeland Security Remixes EP were released digitally in February 2008, the single eventually selling three times platinum in the US and Canada, certified Gold in New Zealand, and becoming the 29th most downloaded song in the digital era in the US and earning a Grammy nomination for Record of the Year. "Paper Planes" is to date XL Recordings' second best selling single, and by November 2011 it had sold 3.6 million copies in the US, currently the seventh best-selling song by a British artist in the digital era. In 2007, M.I.A. also released the How Many Votes Fix Mix EP which included a remix of "Boyz" featuring Jay-Z.

Like its predecessor, universal acclaim met Kala's release in August 2007 and the album earned a normalised rating of 87 out of 100 on Metacritic. Kala was a greater commercial success than Arular. To support Kala, M.I.A. performed at a series of music festivals on the Kala Tour featuring performances in Europe, America and Asia. She performed three dates opening for Björk in the US and France. In 2008, M.I.A. provided guest vocals on Buraka Som Sistema's kuduro song "Sound of Kuduro", recorded in Angola with an accompanying video. The same year, M.I.A. and director Spike Jonze filmed a documentary in Woolwich, South London, in which they both appeared with Afrikan Boy, a Nigerian immigrant rapper and she disclosed plans to launch her own record label, Zig-Zag. She ended the year with concerts in the United Kingdom. By year end, Kala was named the best album of 2007 by publications including Rolling Stone and Blender. Metacritic reported in 2010 that Kala was the tenth Best-Reviewed Electronic/Dance Album on the website of the 2000–09 decade, one position below her debut album Arular. M.I.A. performed on the People vs. Money Tour during the first half of 2008. She cancelled the final leg of her tour in Europe through June and July after revealing her intentions to take a career break and work on other art projects, go back to college and make a film.

In 2008, M.I.A. started her independent record label N.E.E.T. Recordings. The first artist signed to the label was Baltimore rapper Rye Rye, who performed with M.I.A. at the Diesel XXX party at Pier 3 in Brooklyn in October 2008 where it was revealed that M.I.A. was pregnant with her first child. During her performance at the 2008 Bonnaroo Music Festival, M.I.A. announced it was her "last show ever", following by cancelling a British tour and saying she would then focus on recording new material. However, a few days afterwards Danny Boyle called her, wanting her to collaborate with A. R. Rahman in the score of his film Slumdog Millionaire. The result was the song "O... Saya", for which M.I.A. was nominated for an Academy Award for Best Original Song and a World Soundtrack Award for Best Original Song Written Directly for a Film for the song. M.I.A. was due to perform at the Oscars ceremony two weeks after her Grammy Award performance, but could not as she had just given birth to her son. M.I.A. is the first person of Asian descent to be nominated for an Oscar and Grammy award in the same year.

=== 2009–2011: Maya ===
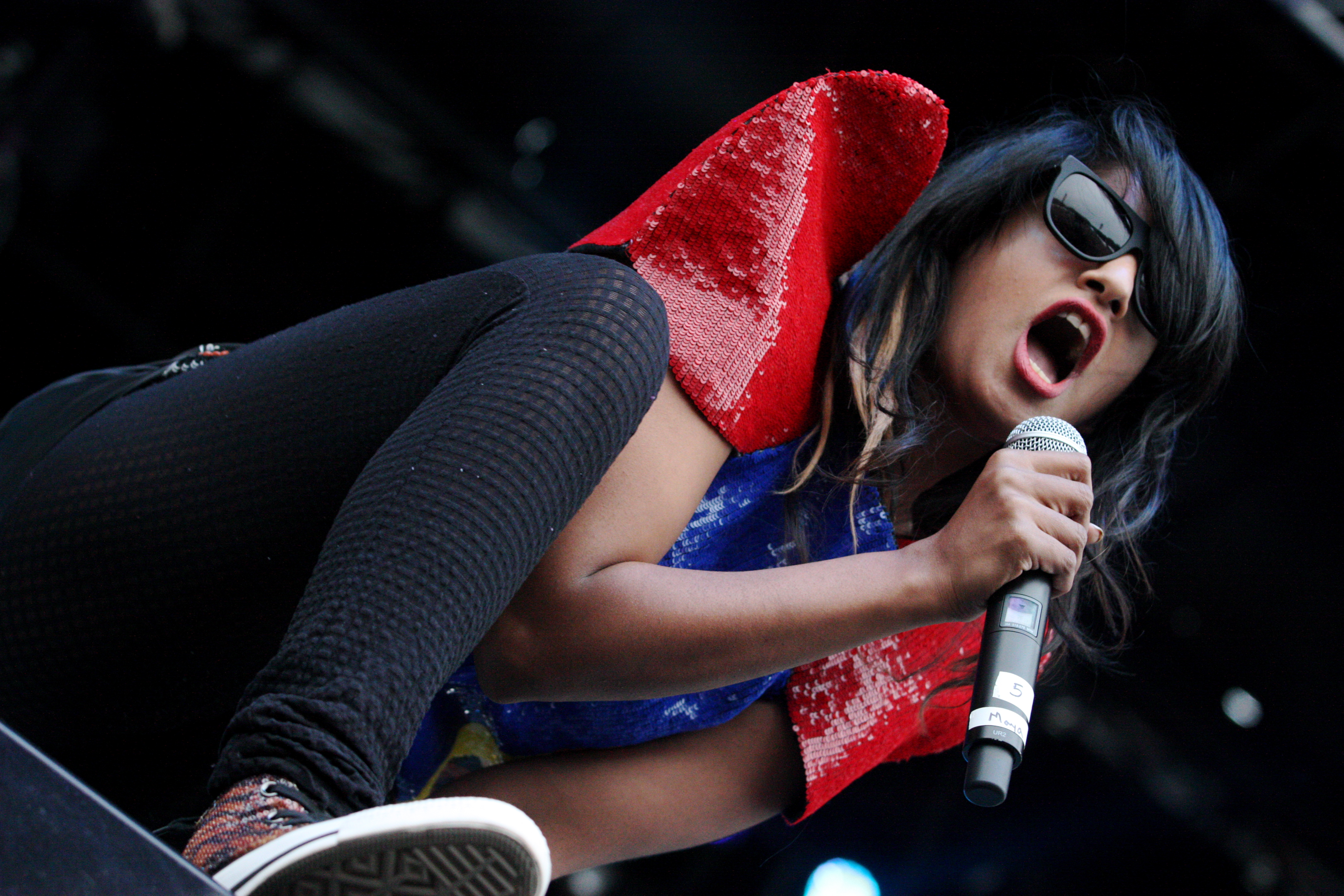
M.I.A. performing at the Outside Lands Music and Arts Festival in August 2009

At the 2009 BRIT Awards in February, M.I.A. was a nominee for Best British Female Artist. Seeking to promote new, underground music with N.E.E.T., M.I.A. signed more bands including Baltimore musician Blaqstarr, indie rock band Sleigh Bells and visual artist Jaime Martinez by late 2009. 3D photographic images of M.I.A. by Martinez were commissioned in April of that year. In August 2009, M.I.A. began composing and recording her third studio album in a home studio section in her Los Angeles house. In January 2010, M.I.A. posted her video for the song "Space". While composing it, she helped write a song with Christina Aguilera called "Elastic Love" for Aguilera's album Bionic. By April 2010, the song and music video/short film "Born Free" were leaked online. The video-film short was directed by Romain Gavras and written by M.I.A., depicting genocide against red-haired adolescents being forced to run across a minefield and caused controversy due to its violent content. The video was removed from YouTube the same day it was released, then reinstated with an age restriction, then removed once more. Although not an official single, the song charted in Sweden and the United Kingdom. M.I.A.'s third album, Maya — stylised as ΛΛ Λ Y Λ — was released on 23 June 2010 in Japan with bonus tracks before its release in other countries. Maya became M.I.A.'s highest charting album globally. Its release in the US was delayed by two weeks. The album garnered a generally favourable, although divided, reception from critics. A more internet-inspired album illustrating how a multimedia artist worked within the music industry, elements of industrial music were incorporated into M.I.A.'s sound for the first time, and it was seen as a stylistic shift towards the more experimental. She described the album in an interview with Dazed & Confused as a mix of "babies, death, destruction and powerlessness".

On 11 May 2010, the first official single from Maya, "XXXO", was released and reached the top forty in Belgium, Spain and the UK. "Steppin' Up", "Teqkilla", and "Tell Me Why" were also released as promotional singles exclusively on iTunes in the days leading to the release of Maya, with "Teqkilla" reaching the top 100 in Canada on digital downloads alone.

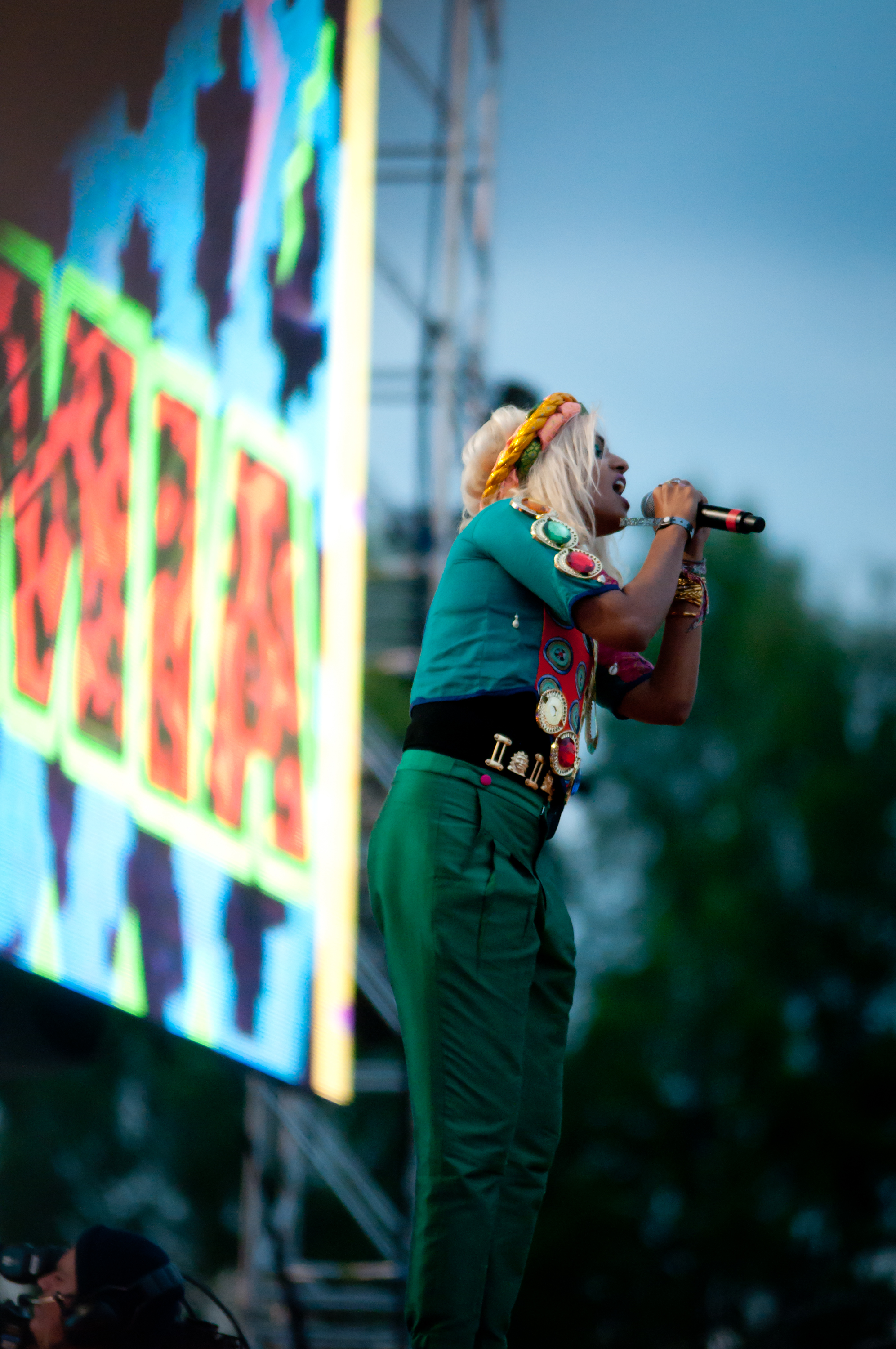
M.I.A. performing at Peace & Love during the Maya Tour, 2011 following the release of her Vicki Leekx mixtape

The video for "XXXO" was released online in August. M.I.A. hinted in an interview to Blitz that a music video is being made with director Spike Jonze for the single "Teqkilla." She completed her live tour dates on the Maya Tour in summer of 2011.

From 2000 until 2010, she directed the video for Elastica single "Mad Dog God Dam" and videos for her songs "Bird Flu", "Boyz", "S.U.S. (Save Ur Soul)", "Space" and "XXXO" as well as personally choosing the directors for the videos of her songs "Galang" and "Sunshowers", which she described in 2005 and again in 2011 as being her favourite video experience and favourite video adaptation of a song of hers, in her words as of 2011, "If you watch only one of my videos, please try "Sunshowers", "Jimmy," "Born Free," and "Bad Girls.", a video inspired by YouTube videos of car stunts and photographs, including one of an Arab female trucker, from the Middle East, which she described as her second favourite music video. She directed a video for Rye Rye's "Bang". She judged in the Music Video category at the inaugural Vimeo Festival & Awards in New York in October 2010.

M.I.A. released her second mixtape, Vicki Leekx, on 31 December 2010, and followed this with Internet Connection: The Remixes, an EP to a bonus track from Maya in January 2011. M.I.A. performed on the song "C.T.F.O." on SebastiAn's album Total. On 21 April 2011, it was reported that M.I.A. had been in the studio with Chris Brown, the Cataracs, Swizz Beatz and Polow da Don. On 24 July 2011, the day after Amy Winehouse's death, M.I.A. uploaded a previously unreleased Maya/Vicki Leekx demo titled "27" to her SoundCloud account. The song was released as a tribute to the 27 Club.

=== 2012–2014: Matangi ===
M.I.A. co-wrote the song "Give Me All Your Luvin'" with Madonna and Nicki Minaj for the album MDNA and performed it at the Super Bowl XLVI halftime show. Controversially, instead of singing the lyric "shit" in the song, M.I.A. extended the middle finger to the camera. The NFL responded by filing a lawsuit suing M.I.A. for millions in damages and demanding a public apology M.I.A. and her legal team responded by saying that the league's claim of "wholesomeness" in the lawsuit is hypocritical, since the NFL itself has had multiple situations of their own players and coaches behaving badly as well as health problems within the league, particularly concussions. In September 2013 M.I.A. released a video statement regarding the lawsuit. In her statement, M.I.A. said, "They're basically [saying] it's OK for me to promote being sexually exploited as a female, than to display empowerment, female empowerment, through being punk rock. That's what it boils down to, and I'm being sued for it." The lawsuit was settled in August 2014; the terms of the settlement remain private.

M.I.A. is also featured in "B-Day Song", another song included on MDNA.

The first buzz track of her fourth album, "Bad Girls", taken from her Vicki Leekx mixtape, premiered on 30 January 2012, was released globally the day after, and was followed by a music video directed by Romain Gavras on 3 February 2012. From her 2018 documentary Matangi/Maya/M.I.A., she revealed that she did not know Madonna planned to release the music video for "Give Me All Your Luvin'", about 10 minutes apart on the same day she would release "Bad Girls" (cited from Matangi/Maya/M.I.A. by Steve Loveridge, 2018, at 1:14:49 ). This received nominations for Video of the Year at the 2012 MTV Video Music Awards and at the 55th Grammy Awards. The song became one of M.I.A.'s most successful singles, charting in the United Kingdom, Australia, France, Canada, United States, Switzerland, South Korea and Belgium. On 29 April 2012 she posted a preview of a new song to YouTube, titled "Come Walk With Me". The full version of Come Walk With Me was shared one and a half year later, in September 2013.

M.I.A. officially signed to Jay-Z's Roc Nation management in May 2012. Rihanna welcomed her to the family, tweeting, "welcome home MIA." She guested during Jay-Z's set at the Radio 1 Festival in Hackney on 23 June 2012.

In October 2012, M.I.A. released an autobiographical book titled M.I.A. documenting "the five years of M.I.A. art that spans across three LPs: Arular, Kala, and Maya." The book contains artwork as well as a foreword by frequent collaborator Steve Loveridge and various essays by M.I.A. On 3 March 2013, she released an 8-minute mix recording as part of a Kenzo fashion show in Paris.

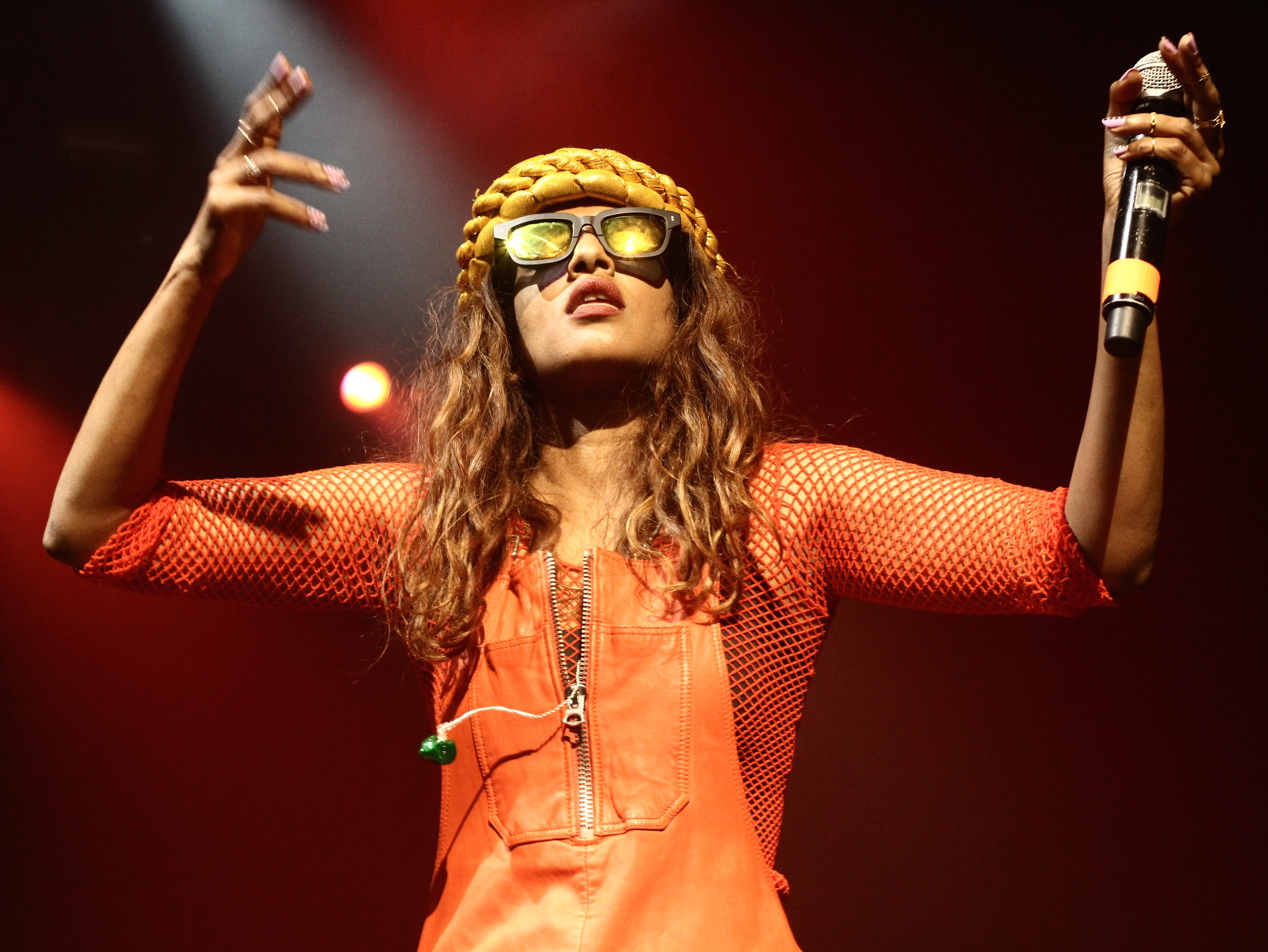
M.I.A. performing at the Zénith de Paris in 2014

Matangi, was recorded across the world with different collaborators. In relation to her previous albums, she described her fourth as "basically all of them together", akin to an anthology. The album was released on Interscope and M.I.A.'s label N.E.E.T. Recordings. Release dates of 31 January 2013 and later, 15 April 2013 were announced, but the album remained unreleased. M.I.A. later revealed that the original project for Matangi was not accepted by Interscope, which claimed that the record was "too positive". "Bring the Noize", produced by French producer Surkin and Switch, was announced as the second single and was released on 17 June 2013. Soon after the single was released, the official video for "Bring the Noize" premiered on 25 June via Noisey. On 9 August 2013, the album received an official release date of 5 November 2013 after M.I.A. threatened to leak the album due to the numerous delays by Interscope.

Matangi received generally positive reviews from music critics. In its first week of release, the album sold 15,000 copies and peaked at number 23 on the Billboard 200, falling to number 90 in its second week.

On 31 December 2013, M.I.A. announced that she was leaving Roc Nation.

=== 2015–2019: AIM and Matangi/Maya/M.I.A ===
On 13 July 2015, M.I.A. released a five-minute video titled "Matahdatah Scroll 01 Broader Than a Border" which features two of her tracks: Matangi's "Warriors" and a new track "Swords". The music is sampled from Yo Yo Honey Singh's Manali Trance. The video was filmed in India and West Africa and shows different forms of dancing in those regions.

On 27 November 2015, M.I.A. released "Borders" as her new single on iTunes, prior to that her new single was announced via her Instagram account. Serving as both a rallying cry and a call for compassion, the track mocks first world problems and shares her views on the escalating global refugee crisis. The self-directed video that accompanied its release shows her joining "those attempting to flee their homes by cramming on boats, wading in the ocean and climbing barbed-wire fences". In January 2016, the French football club Paris Saint-Germain sued M.I.A. for wearing a version of their club's T-shirt in her "Borders" video that changed the words "Fly Emirates" to "Fly Pirates".

In late February 2016, she released "Boom ADD", an expanded version of the "Boom Skit", which appeared on M.I.A.'s fourth studio album Matangi; it is a diss-track to the NFL's lawsuit of her performance at the Super Bowl XLVI. On 9 September 2016, she released her fifth studio album AIM to mixed reviews, with "Poc Still A Ryda", a lyrical mix of the songs on the album, preceding the album's release. On 8 February 2017, she released a new song, along with a music video, entitled "P.O.W.A", a previously unreleased song from her recording sessions for AIM.

In 2018, Matangi/Maya/M.I.A. was released, a 90-minute documentary film chronicling M.I.A.'s rise to fame and political activism surrounding the Sri Lankan Civil War. Directed and produced by Steve Loveridge, the film premiered at the 2018 Sundance Film Festival and later saw a wide release in select theatres in the U.K. and the U.S. in September 2018. The film won the World Cinema Documentary Special Jury Award at Sundance. Following the film's release on digital platforms in December 2018, M.I.A. premiered the official music video for "Reload", a previously unreleased song originally written with Justine Frischmann in 2004 for Arular, which appears on the film's soundtrack.

=== 2020–2025: Mata ===
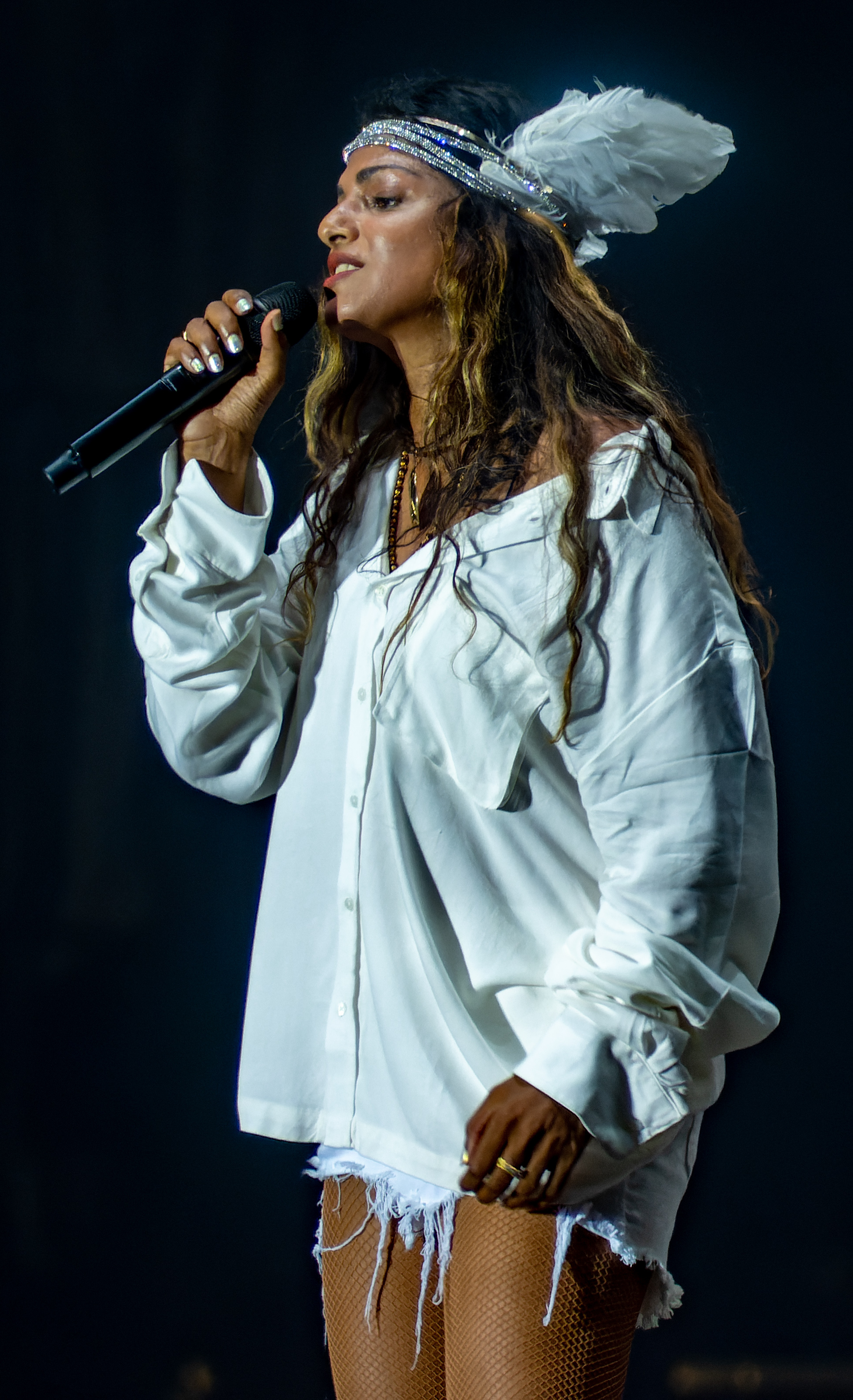
M.I.A. performing at Primavera Sound 2022

On 31 January 2020, M.I.A launched a Patreon page to fund new music, saying that her new album is "nearly finished". On 22 March 2020, M.I.A. released "OHMNI 202091", her first song in three years, and suggested that a new record would arrive the same year. On 9 September, she shared a standalone song titled "CTRL" on her website. She was featured alongside Young Thug on the single "Franchise" by rapper Travis Scott, which was released on 25 September 2020. The song debuted at number one on the US Billboard Hot 100, earning M.I.A. her first number-one single on the chart.

On 1 November 2021, M.I.A. announced in an Instagram post that her sixth album is called Mata. As to the concept of the album, she described it as a way "to reflect who I am, what we want to build."

M.I.A. released a single titled "Babylon" on Friday, 12 November. The single was released alongside the rappers 2010 mixtape Vicki Leekx, sold as NFTs to raise money for the Courage Foundation. An accompanying music video was released on her website ohmni.com and features video footage of M.I.A. earlier in her life.

On 26 May 2022, M.I.A. shared the lead single from Mata on The Zane Lowe Show, titled "The One". The second single from the album, "Popular", was released on 12 August 2022 along with its official music video. Mata was released on 14 October 2022.

In December 2023 the mixtape Bells Collection appeared.

A standalone single, "Armour", was released in January 2025. Another single, "Safe", and its accompanying music video, was released in June 2025.

=== 2026–present: M.I.7 ===
On 7 April 2026, M.I.A. announced that her seventh album, M.I.7, would be released on 17 April and released its lead single "Everything". During her 2 May set in Dallas while opening for Kid Cudi, M.I.A. was booed after calling herself a Republican and making a comment about potential illegal immigrants in the audience. On 4 May, Kid Cudi kicked M.I.A. off the tour, saying "I won't have someone on my tour making offensive remarks that upsets my fanbase."

== Artistry ==
=== Musical style and influences ===
"Galang"
21-second sample of M.I.A.'s single "Galang" from album Arular. First released in 2003, with its mix of 505 beats and claps, edgy vocals and lyrics, it marked M.I.A.'s emergence in underground independent music circles worldwide.

"Bird Flu"
Short clip of "Bird Flu" showing the Gaana-inspired track's use of urumee drums.

M.I.A.'s music features styles such as electro, reggae, rhythm and blues, alternative rock, hip hop, grime, rap ballads and Asian folk and references to her musical influences such as Missy Elliott, Tamil film music, Lou Reed, the Pixies, Timbaland, Beastie Boys, and London Posse. She was a childhood fan of Boney M, composer A. R. Rahman and pop artists Michael Jackson and Madonna, also she has cited Björk as an inspiration and has been influenced by The Slits, Public Enemy, Malcolm McLaren and The Clash. Noting her early inspirations, she said "When I would go to bed, I'd listen to the radio and dream about dancing and Paula Abdul and Whitney Houston, and that's how I fell asleep. When my radio was burgled, I started listening to hip hop". She has revealed her ideal karaoke song would be "Germ-Free Adolescents" by X-Ray Spex. M.I.A. describes her music as dance music or club music for the "other", and has been described as an "anti-popstar" for refusing to conform to certain recording industry expectations of solo artists. M.I.A.'s early compositions relied heavily on the Roland MC-505, while later M.I.A. experimented further with her established sound and drew from a range of genres, creating layered textures of instruments, electronics and sounds outside the traditional studio environment.

Jimmy Iovine, the chairman of M.I.A.'s American distribution label Interscope, compares M.I.A. to Reed and punk rock songwriter Patti Smith, and recalled, "She's gonna do what she's gonna do, I can't tell her shit." "The really left-of-center artists, you really wonder about them. Can the world catch up? Can the culture meet them in the middle? That's what the adventure is. It doesn't always happen, but it should and it could." Richard Russell, head of XL Recordings, states, "You've got to bend culture around to suit you, and I think M.I.A has done that" adding that M.I.A.'s composition and production skills were a major attraction for him. As a vocalist, M.I.A. is recognisable by her distinctive whooping, chanting voice, which has been described as having an "indelible, nursery-rhyme swing." She has adopted different singing styles on her songs, from aggressive raps, to semi-spoken and melodic vocals. She has said of the sometimes "unaffected" vocals and delivery of her lyrics, "It is what it is. Most people would just put it down to me being lazy. But at the same time, I don't want [that perfection]," saying some of the "raw and difficult" vocal styles she used reflected what was happening to her during recording.

== Public image and stage ==
Critic Sasha Frere-Jones, writing for The New Yorker in 2010, praised the self-made "unpretentious, stuck together with Scotch tape" style that M.I.A. achieves with her Roland MC-505 drum machine and keyboard unit, noting that several artists had tried to emulate the style since. Her considerable influence on American hip hop music as an international artist is described by Adam Bradley and Andrew DuBois in The Anthology of Rap as making her an "unlikely" hip hop celebrity, given that the genre was one of several influences behind M.I.A.'s "eccentric and energizing" music and that the musician's unclassifiable sound was one example of how hip hop was changing as it came into contact with other cultures. Similarly, Jeffrey H. Wallenfeldt writes in The Black Experience in America : From Civil Rights to the Present that no single artist may have personified hip hop in the 21st century better than M.I.A., in her "politically radical lyrics drawing from widely diverse sources around the world".

The Guardian critic Hattie Collins commented of M.I.A.'s influence: "A new raver before it was old. A baile funk/pop pioneer before CSS and Bonde do Rolê emerged. A quirky female singer/rapper before the Mini Allens had worked out how to log on to MySpace. Missing In Action (or Acton, as she sometimes calls herself) has always been several miles ahead of the pack." The twisting of western modalities in her music style using multilingual, multiethnic soundscapes to make electroclash-pop albums is noted by Derek Beres in Global beat fusion: the history of the future of music (2005) to defy world music categorisation. In the book Downloading Music (2007), Linda Aksomitis notes the various aspects of peer-to-peer file sharing of music in the rise in popularity of M.I.A., including the advantages and disadvantages of the internet and platforms such as MySpace in the launch of her career. Andy Bennett and Jon Stratton explore in Britpop and the English Music Tradition (2010) how M.I.A. alongside musicians such as Sway and Dizzee Rascal created music that both explored new soundscapes and commented on social issues as well. Bennett and Stratton argue that the innovation that generates new musical genres such as grime and dubstep are, inevitably, political in nature. The success of grime-influenced artists such as M.I.A. is analyzed as a way in which white Britons adapted to the increasingly multicultural musical mix, which they compare with bands of the Britpop genre. Furthermore, her work being used as a global resource for the articulation of differently located themes and its connections to many music traditions is noted by Brian Longhurst in Popular music and society (2007) to illustrate such processes of interracial dialogue. Gary Shteyngart writing in GQ notes that "M.I.A. is perhaps the preeminent global musical artist of the 2000s, a truly kick-ass singer and New York-Londony fashion icon, not to mention a vocal supporter of Sri Lanka's embattled Tamil minority, of which she's a member."

M.I.A.'s stage performances are described as "highly energetic" and multimedia showcases, often with scenes of what Rolling Stone critic Rob Sheffield describes as "jovial chaos, with dancers and toasters and random characters roaming the stage," bringing various crowds with interests in art, music and fashion. Camille Dodero, writing in The Village Voice opined that M.I.A. "works hard to manifest the chaos of her music in an actual environment, and, more than that, to actively create discomfort, energy, and anger through sensory overload." Her role as an artist in and voice lender to the subaltern is appreciated by theorists as having brought such ideas to first world view. USA Today included her on its list of the 100 Most Interesting People of 2007 and she was named one of Time Out's 40th Birthday London Heroes in 2008. The same year, Esquire listed M.I.A. as one of the 75 Most Influential People of the 21st century, describing her as the first and only major artist in world music, and in 2009 she was cited in Time magazine's Time 100 as one of the world's most influential people for her global influence across many genres. In December 2010, USA Today listed M.I.A. at number 63 on its list of the "100 People of 2010". M.I.A. placed number 14 on Rolling Stone's Decade-End Readers' Poll of "Top Artists Of The Decade." Rolling Stone named her one of eight artists who defined the 2000s decade.

=== Themes and artwork ===
M.I.A. integrates imagery of political violence with her music videos and her cover art. Her politically inspired art became recognised while she exhibited and published several of her brightly coloured stencils and paintings portraying the tiger, a symbol of Tamil nationalism, ethnic conflict in Sri Lanka and urban Britain in the early 2000s. Lyrics on Arular regarding her experiences of identity politics, poverty, revolution, gender and sexual stereotypes, war, and the conditions of working class in London were hailed as new and unorthodox, setting her apart from previous artists. The album references the PLO and the Tamil independence movements and features culture jamming, multi-lingual slang, strident and subtle imagery. Her albums' social commentary and storytelling have incited debate on the "invigoratingly complex" politics of the issues she highlighted in the album, breaking taboos while the US Military was engaged in the 2003 Iraq War in the Middle East during the Bush administration. Government visits to her official website following her debut album's release in 2005, and a US refusal to grant M.I.A. a travel visa coupled with her brief presence on the US Homeland Security Risk List in 2006 due to her politically charged lyrics led to her second album Kala being recorded in a variety of locations around the world. The American Civil Liberties Union described the actions as part of a trend of ideological exclusion by the state which was detrimental to democracy by "censoring and manipulating debate". In October 2016, she revealed on her Instagram that she had finally been approved for a US visa.

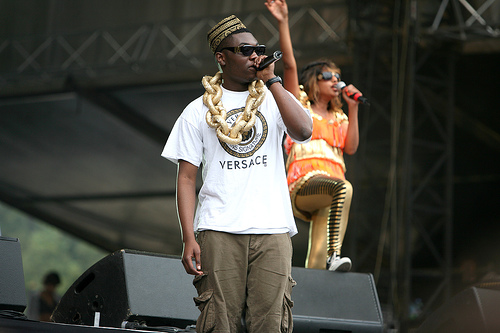
Afrikan Boy, an afrobeats and grime London MC with Nigerian roots supporting M.I.A. at the Rock en Seine Festival, 2007

On Kala, M.I.A.'s songs explored immigration politics and her personal relationships. Many related her experiences during recording sessions in Madras, Angola, Trinidad shantytowns, Liberia and London, and were acclaimed. The album's artwork was inspired by African art, "from dictator fashion to old stickers on the back of cars", which like her clothing range, she hoped would capture "a 3-D sense, the shapes, the prints, the sound, film, technology, politics, economics" of a certain time. I-D magazine described the "bleeding cacophony of graphics" on her website during this time as evoking the "noisy amateurism" of the early web, but also embodying a rejection of today's "glossy, professional site design" which was felt to "efface the medium rather than celebrate it." Jeff Chang, writing for The Nation, described a "Kala for the Nation" and the album's music, lyrics and imagery as encompassing "everywhere—or, to be specific, everywhere but the First World's self-regarding 'here'", stating that against a media flow that suppresses the "ugliness" of reality and fixes beauty to consumption, M.I.A. forces a conversation about how the majority live, closing the distance "between 'here' and everywhere else". He felt that Kala explored poverty, violence and globalisation through the eyes of "children left behind."

Her third album, Maya, tackled information politics in the digital age, loaded with technological references and love songs, and deemed by Kitty Empire writing in The Observer to be her most melancholic and mainstream effort. Her genocide-depicting 2010 video for the single "Born Free" was deemed by Ann Powers writing in the Los Angeles Times to be "concentrating fully" on the physical horror of gun butts and bullets hitting flesh, with the scenes giving added poignancy to the lyrical themes of the song. Interpreted as a comment on the Arizona immigration law, America's military might and desensitised attitudes towards violence, others found that the video stressed that genocide still exists and violent repression remains commonplace. Some critics described the film as "sensationalist". Neda Ulaby of NPR described the video as intended for "shock value" in the service of nudging people into considering real issues that can be hard to talk about. M.I.A. revealed that she felt "disconnected" during the writing process, and spoke of the Internet inspiration and themes of information politics that could be found in the songs and the artwork.

M.I.A. views her work as reflective, pieced together in one piece "so you can acquire it and hear it." She states, "All that information floats around where we are—the images, the opinions, the discussions, the feelings—they all exist, and I felt someone had to do something about it because I can't live in this world where we pretend nothing really matters." On the political nature of her songs she has said, "Nobody wants to be dancing to political songs. Every bit of music out there that's making it into the mainstream is really about nothing. I wanted to see if I could write songs about something important and make it sound like nothing. And it kind of worked." Censorship on MTV of "Sunshowers" proved controversial and was again criticised following the Kala release "Paper Planes". YouTube's block and subsequent age gating/obscuring of the video for "Born Free" from Maya due to its graphic violence/political subtext was criticised by M.I.A. as hypocritical, citing the Internet channel's streaming of real-life killings. She went on to state, "It's just fake blood and ketchup and people are more offended by that than the execution videos", referring to clips of Sri Lankan troops extrajudicially shooting unarmed, blindfolded, naked men that she had previously tweeted. Despite the block, the video remained on her website and Vimeo, and has been viewed 30 million times on the internet. Lisa Weems writes in the book Postcolonial challenges in education how M.I.A. pointed out in her music how immigrants, refugees and persons of the third world can and do resist through economic, political and cultural discursive practices. In light of her influence in modern culture and the historical and political significance embedded in both the instrumental music and lyrics of her songs, J. Gentry of Brown University instructs a course from summer 2012 titled "Music & Politics: From Mozart to M.I.A.", with the objective of academically exploring and examining the political messages and contexts of music and the way "music has consistently participated in and reflected the political debates of its time".

=== Fashion and style ===
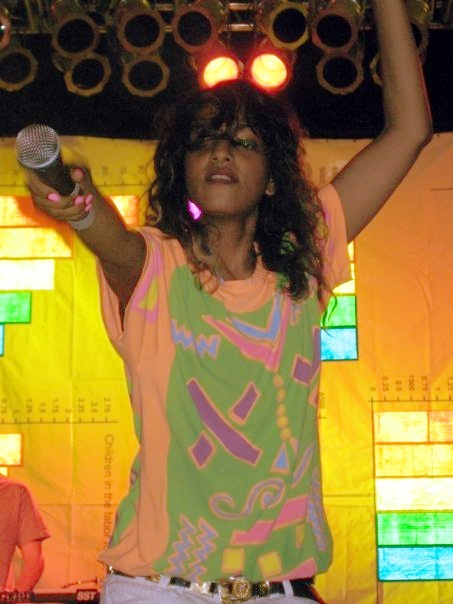
M.I.A. performing on the People vs. Money Tour

M.I.A. cites guerrilla art and fashion as major influences. Her mother works as a seamstress in London. An early interest in fashion and textiles–designing confections of "bright fluorescent fishnet fabrics"—was a hallmark of her time at Central Saint Martins College. M.I.A. was a roommate of fashion designer Luella Bartley and is a long-time friend of designer Carri Mundane. Clothes from her limited-edition "Okley Run" line—Mexican and Afrika line jackets and leggings, Islamic-inspired and water melon-print hoodies, and tour-inspired designs–were sold in 2008 during New York fashion week. She commented, "I wanted to tie all my work together. When I make an album, I make a number of artworks that go with it, and now I make some clothes that go with it too. So this Okley run was an extension of my Kala album and artwork." Spin described her designs as "1000 watt Malcolm McLaren-meets-Basquiat", that complimented her personal style that could "run from futurist aerobic instructor to new wave pirate to queenly candy raver".

Contrary to her present style, M.I.A.'s Arular era style has been described as "tattered hand me downs and patched T-shirts of indigents", embodying the "uniform of the refugee" but modified with cuts, alterations and colours to fashion a distinctly new style and apparel line. M.I.A. built on this during the Kala era with a "playful" combination of baggy T-shirts, leggings and short-shorts. She incorporated eccentric accessories in bold patterns, sparkle and "over-saturated" neon colour to fashion her signature style which inspired flocks of "garishly-clothed all-too-sassy" new-rave girls with bright red tights, cheetah-skin smock and faded 1980s T- shirts. Her commodifying and performance of this refugee image has been noted to "reposition" perceptions of it in the wider public. Hailed as presenting a challenge to the mainstream with her ironic style, M.I.A. has been praised for dictating such a subcultural trend worldwide, combining "adolescent" frustrations of race and class with a strong desire to dance. Eddy Lawrence of Time Out commented how her multi genre style contributed to her being beloved of the broadsheet fashionistas yet simultaneously patron saint and pin-up for the Day-Glo nu-rave kids. Similarly, Mary Beth Ray, in the book Rock Brands: Selling Sound in a Media Saturated Culture writes that M.I.A.'s hybrid style addressed a number of social and political issues including power, violence, identity and survival in a globalised world, while using avenues that challenged "traditional" definitions of what it meant to be a contemporary pop artist.

M.I.A. was once denied entry into a Marc Jacobs party, but subsequently DJed at the designer's 2008 fashion show afterparty, and modelled for "Marc by Marc Jacobs" in Spring/Summer 2008. M.I.A.'s fashion and style landed her on Vogue's 10 Best Dressed of 2008. She turned down her inclusion on People magazine's list of the "50 Most Beautiful People in the World" the same year. M.I.A.'s status as a style icon, trendsetter and trailblazer is globally affirmed, with her distinct identity, style, and music illuminating social issues of gender, the third world, and popular music. Critics point out that such facets of her public persona underline the importance of authenticity, challenging the globalised popular music market, and demonstrating music's strive to be political. Her albums have been met with acclaim, often heralded as "eclectic" for possessing a genre all their own, "packaging inherent politics in the form of pleasurable dance music." M.I.A.'s artistic efforts to connect this "extreme eclecticism" with issues of exile, war, violence and terrorism are both commended and criticised. Commentators laud M.I.A.'s use and subversion of her refugee and migrant experiences, through the weaving of musical creativity, artwork and fashion with her personal life as having dispelled stereotypical notions of the immigrant experience. This gives her a unique place in popular music, while demanding new responses within popular music, media and fashion culture. M.I.A. has been the muse of designers Donatella Versace and Bartley and photographers Rankin and David Bailey, whose spread documents the British musicians who defined the sound and style of rock 'n' roll. On 1 July 2012 M.I.A. attended the Atelier Versace Show in Paris, wearing clothing inspired from the designer's 1992 collection. In 2013 she released her own Versace Collection.

== Legacy ==
Music culture writer Michael Meyer said that M.I.A.'s record imagery, lyrical booklets, homepages and videos supported the "image of provocation yet also avoidance of, or inability to use consistent images and messages." Instead of catering to stereotypes, he felt that M.I.A. "played with them" creating an uncategorisable and hence unsettling result. Critic Zach Baron felt that it had been shown in her career that M.I.A. had "always been adept at using a larger force against itself." M.I.A. has been hailed as demonstrating dislocation to be a "productive site of departure" and praised for her ability to transform such a "disadvantage" into a creative form of expression.

Regarding her first two albums, Arular and Kala, PopMatters writer Rob Wheaton felt M.I.A. subverted the "abstract, organized, refined" distilling of violence in Western popular music and imagination and made her work represent much of the developing world's decades-long experiences of "arbitrary, unannounced, and spectacular" slaughter, deeming her work an "assault" with realism. Frank Guan of Vulture said that Kala "sounded like the future" and that "M.I.A.'s immediate influence was remarkable", as the album "seems to herald certain trends current in contemporary hip-hop". Guan further gave appraisal to M.I.A. for being the "precursor" for "fashion-rap" acts, including Travis Scott, Lil Uzi Vert, Playboi Carti, and ASAP Rocky. Writing for Dazed Digital, Grant Rinder praised the album for transforming M.I.A. from a "cult hero" to an "international star". Rinder commented that the album was a "tremendous" step forward towards shedding light on the realities of Third World countries that the Western world may not have thoroughly understood. Reflecting on diversity and representation issues in society, as well as politics surrounding President Donald Trump, Rinder said that Kala "feels particularly ahead of its time", and concluded that "M.I.A. was truly a pioneer for a global humanitarian perspective that no artist has been able to deliver quite as well since."

Some detractors criticised M.I.A. early in her music career for "using radical chic" and for her attendance of an art school. Critic Simon Reynolds, writing in The Village Voice in 2005 saw this as a lack of authenticity and felt M.I.A. was "a veritable vortex of discourse, around most likely irresolvable questions concerning authenticity, post-colonialism, and dilettantism". He continued that while swayed by her chutzpah and ability to deliver live, he "was also turned off by the stencil-sprayed projection imagery of grenades, tanks, and so forth (redolent of the Clash with their strife-torn Belfast stage backdrops and Sandinista cred by association)" while the "99 percent white audience punched the air", admonishing what he perceived as a "lack of local character" to her debut album.

Critic Robert Christgau described Reynolds' argument as "cheap tack" in another article written in the publication, stating M.I.A's experiences connected her to world poverty in a way "few Western whites can grasp". He questioned why M.I.A.'s 2001 Alternative Turner Prize nominated images of pastel-washed tigers, soldiers, guns, armoured vehicles, and fleeing civilians that bedeck M.I.A.'s albums and videos were not assumed or analysed as being incendiary propaganda, suggesting that unlike art buyers, rock and roll fans were "assumed to be stupid". Reynolds later argued that M.I.A. was the "Artist of the Decade" in a 2009 issue of The Guardian. While accepting her British Dance Act award at the Brit Awards 2025, Charli XCX shouted M.I.A. out in her speech, among other dance acts she had been influenced by.

== Social causes ==
=== Activism ===
M.I.A.'s commentary on the oppression of Sri Lankan Tamils has drawn praise and criticism. The United States has restricted her access into and out of the country during her career since the release of her debut album. M.I.A. notes that the voicelessness she felt as a child dictated her role as a refugee advocate and voice lender to civilians in war during her career.

Sometimes I repeat my story again and again because it's interesting to see how many times it gets edited, and how much the right to tell your story doesn't exist. People reckon that I need a political degree in order to go, 'My school got bombed and I remember it cos I was 10-years-old'. I think if there is an issue of people who, having had first hand experiences, are not being able to recount that – because there is laws or government restrictions or censorship or the removal of an individual story in a political situation – then that's what I'll keep saying and sticking up for, cos I think that's the most dangerous thing. I think removing individual voices and not letting people just go 'This happened to me' is really dangerous. That's what was happening ... nobody handed them the microphone to say 'This is happening and I don't like it'.

— M.I.A., Clash

M.I.A. attributes much of her success to the "homeless, rootlessness" of her early life. Due to her and her family being displaced from Sri Lanka because of the Civil War, M.I.A. has become a refugee icon. The EMP Museum's 2008 Pop Conference featured paper submissions and discussions on M.I.A. presented on the theme of "Shake, Rattle: Music, Conflict, and Change".

M.I.A. has spoken of discussions with witnesses during and after the war as reinforcing the need for international intervention to protect and provide justice to Tamil people. As the 2009 Tamil diaspora protests gathered pace, she joined other activists in condemning the actions of the Sri Lankan government against the Tamil populace as a slow "systematic" genocide. Telling Time that she did not see anything wrong in sticking up for 300,000 trapped and dying people, M.I.A. stated that international governments were privy to Sri Lanka's use of widespread censorship and propaganda on the rebellion during the island's civil war to aid its impunity in numerous atrocities on civilians, but had no will to end it. Sri Lanka's Foreign Secretary denied that his country perpetrated genocide, responding that he felt M.I.A. was "misinformed" and that "it's best she stays with what she's good at, which is music, not politics."

She has been accused of being a "terrorist sympathiser" and "LTTE supporter" by the Sri Lankan government, and by public figures such as Oprah Winfrey, as was stated in a Rolling Stone magazine article, where the singer recalled their exchange: "She shut me down. She took that photo of me, but she was just like, 'I can't talk to you because you're crazy and you're a terrorist.' And I'm like, 'I'm not. I'm a Tamil and there are people dying in my country and you have to like look at it because you're fucking Oprah and every American told me you're going to save the world.'"

Two weeks before his death, the Tigers' Political Head B. Nadesan told Indian magazine, The Week, that he felt that M.I.A.'s humanitarianism had been a source of strength to Eelam Tamils and fearless, knowingly amidst the "all-powerful Sri Lankan propaganda machinery that demonises any one who speaks for the Tamils." Miranda Sawyer of The Observer highlighted that M.I.A. was emotional and that this could be limiting her, stating that while she was well informed, "you're not meant to get involved when giving information out about war", and that the difficulty for M.I.A. was that the world "doesn't really care".

Hate mail, including death threats directed at M.I.A. and her son, has followed her activism, which she cited as an influence on the songs on her album Maya.

In 2008, M.I.A. filmed from her Bed Stuy apartment window and posted on YouTube an incident involving a black man being apprehended by white policemen, which in light of the Sean Bell shooting incident, elicited commentary debating the force used for the arrest. She has spoken of the combined effects that news corporations and search engine Google have on news and data collection, while stressing the need for alternative news sources that she felt her son's generation would need in order to ascertain truth. She told Nylon magazine that social networking site Facebook and Google's development "by the CIA" was harmful to internet freedom. Some criticised the claim as lacking detail.

On 2 December 2013 Time asked M.I.A. whom she would pick for its "Person of the Year" and she said it would be N.S.A. whistleblower Edward Snowden. On 8 July 2016 M.I.A. tweeted a YouTube video of an episode of Edward Snowden on the HBO show Vice entitled "State of Surveillance" which discusses abilities of governments to hack into cellular phones.

=== Anti-vaccination and anti-5G ===
In 2020, M.I.A. stated that she would "choose death" over a COVID-19 vaccine. She later clarified by saying that she is not against vaccines but that she is "against companies who care more for profit then [sic] humans." That same year, she also commented on the conspiracy theory linking 5G to COVID-19, tweeting "Prevention is always better then [sic] cure. Can you love vax and 5G at the same time?" and expressing the belief that 5G connectivity is able to "confuse or slow the body down in healing process as body is learning to cope with new wavelength [sic] frequencies etc @ same time as Cov." In October 2022, after American conspiracy theorist Alex Jones was ordered to pay almost $1 billion to the parents of children killed in the 2012 Sandy Hook Elementary School shooting, M.I.A. tweeted: "If Alex Jones pays for lying, shouldn't every celebrity pushing vaccines pay too?" In June 2024, she announced an anti-5G clothing line, titled Ohmni, on The Alex Jones Show. Items include ponchos, dresses, shirts and hats made of fabric woven with materials such as silver, copper and nickel, blocking or shielding against electrical signals, electromagnetic radiation and radio frequency interference.

=== Politics ===
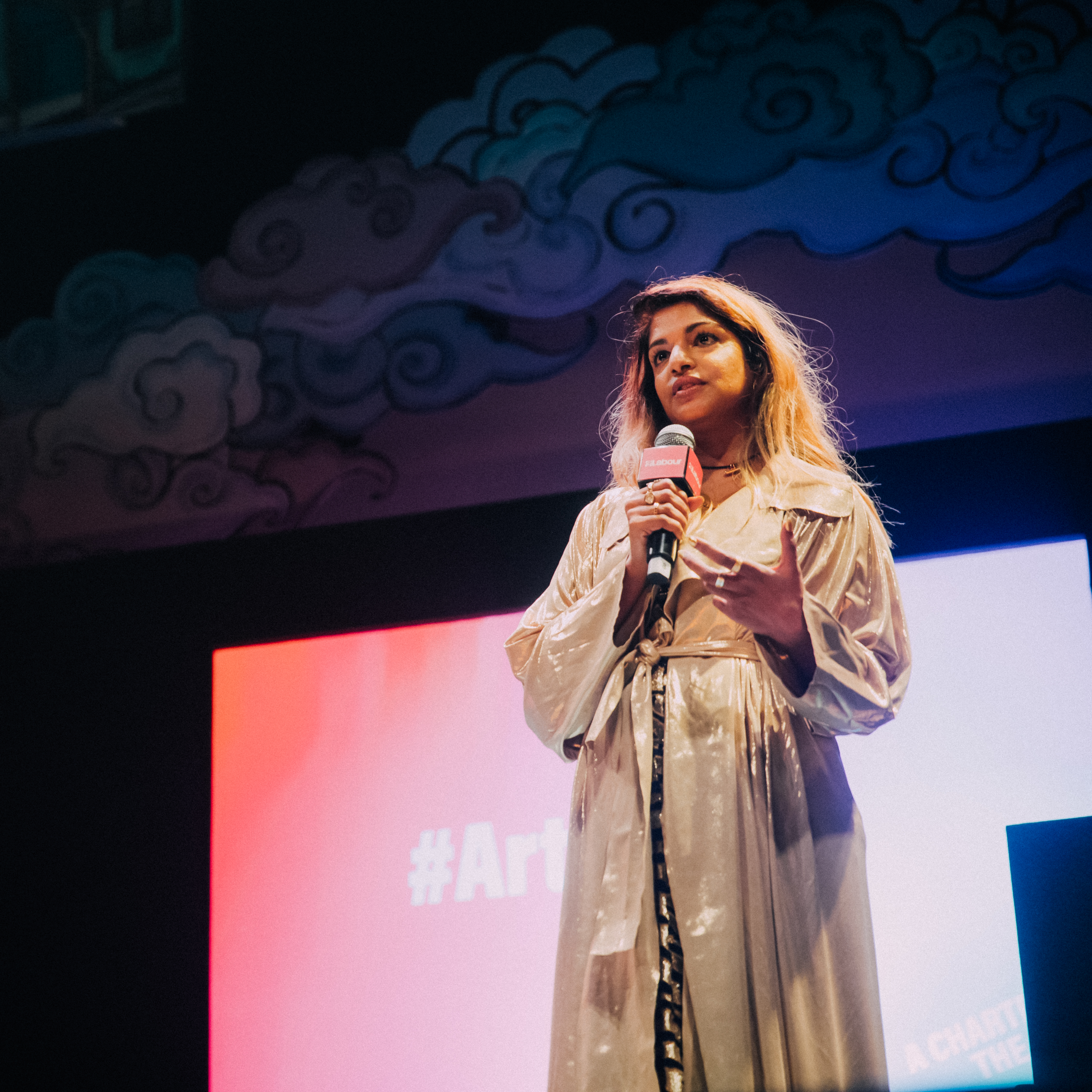
M.I.A. speaking at Labour's Charter for the Arts launch in November 2019

M.I.A. endorsed candidate Jan Jananayagam at the 2009 European Parliament election, a last-minute candidate standing on a platform of anti-genocide, civil liberties, financial transparency, the environment and women's rights, who became one of the most successful independent election candidates ever despite her loss in the general election.

In October 2009, she stated that Barack Obama should give back his 2009 Nobel Peace Prize "like John Lennon sent back his MBE."

In 2010, she condemned the Chinese government's role in supporting and supplying arms to the Sri Lankan government during the conflict in an interview with music magazine Mondomix, stating that China's influence within the United Nations was preventing prosecutions of war crimes committed during the conflict.

Sometime during the 2011 United Kingdom anti-austerity protests and the 2011 London riots, her cousin's jewellery shop in Croydon was attacked and looted.

M.I.A. has been a supporter of WikiLeaks and Julian Assange. In her book, M.I.A. wrote regarding WikiLeaks:

So obviously I love WikiLeaks because, after I'd gone through the whole backlash, they were the first news information site to confirm any news on the Sri Lankan war in the truest form; they were the first to release information stating the truth about what had happened to the Tamils as I knew it and to reveal that the United Nations was aware that the Sri Lankan government was lying—war crimes had been committed but their hands were tied because any time anyone tried to impose sanctions, governments would walk out."

She composed the theme to Assange's television show The World Tomorrow and later stood by Assange's side as he held a press conference at the Ecuadorian Embassy in London where Assange was successfully granted political asylum by Ecuador in August 2012. She posted a photo of Assange from within the embassy, and later tweeted, "hummmm after this day 2things have 2 happen. ... ., either 500 cops turn up outside every rape case reported even if it's without charge. or we get raped by the powerz that be and we deal 4eva." The tweets were in reference to an arrest warrant the Swedish Prosecutor's Office issued in August 2010 for Assange on two charges: rape and molestation. Earlier in 2012 Britain's Supreme Court denied an appeal by Assange to avoid extradition to Sweden to face these charges. In November 2013, Assange appeared via Skype to open M.I.A.'s New York City concert.

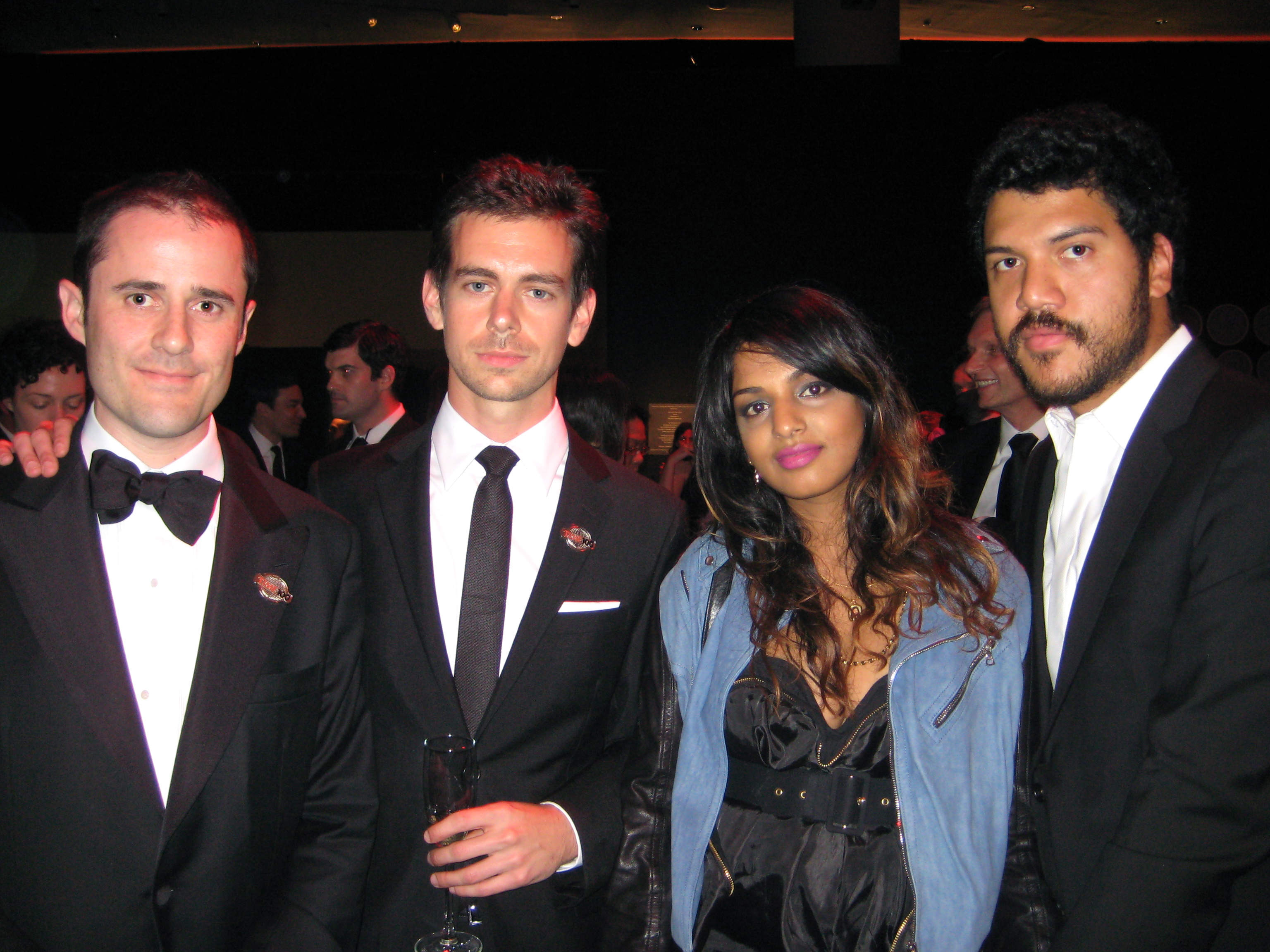
M.I.A. with then-partner Ben Bronfman (right) and Twitter founders Evan Williams and Jack Dorsey (left and center respectively)

Ann Powers, in conversation with Billboard said that in trying to handle political issues and creating art, the musician did not want to compromise or keep silent. She wrote that this method worked for The Clash, but that this was at a certain time and a certain place, that they benefited from being a band, and that audiences were more used to seeing men being confrontational. Conversely, Denise Sullivan writing in Keep on Pushing: Black Power Music from Blues to Hip-Hop (2011), noted that in contrast to other rock musicians, M.I.A. furthered the legacy of The Clash, "creating a controversy while doing so". Critic Jon Dolan of Spin wrote M.I.A. may be a "confused revolutionary? brilliant provocateur?" and one of the most polarising yet thrilling figures in pop music today. Sarahanna, writing in Impose magazine cited composer Igor Stravinsky in describing M.I.A.'s role as an artist who challenged the audience into breaking their mind from a conservative cycle of familiarity. Baron writing in the Village Voice felt that although M.I.A.'s bloodline, politics and grievance meant that she was more informed than most and gave her "every right to be a partisan and were reason for caution," he praised her efforts for leading thousands of American writers including himself to know of the situation in Sri Lanka as "brilliant", noting her mainly humanitarian angle in her protesting of civilian casualties that had been vastly and disproportionately inflicted on Sri Lanka's Tamil minority and her courage in "putting her success and fame on the line to use every opportunity and avenue possible to remind Americans and people around the globe of this conflict" is pretty much the most admirable thing going in pop music.

In a 2 September 2016 interview with The New York Times, M.I.A. talked about making the decision to sacrifice fame and money for speech. "I had the choice to shut my mouth and not be political in order to catapult my fame and popularity and my bank balance. But that's not the choice I made."

In June 2017, M.I.A endorsed Labour Party leader Jeremy Corbyn in the 2017 UK general election. In a video shared on her social channels she said: "I don't usually believe politicians, but I think Corbyn is actually, like, real." She added: "So this is a once in a lifetime opportunity – please go vote. You don't have to trust a politician or vote ever again, but just do it now." In November 2019, M.I.A also endorsed Corbyn in the 2019 UK general election. She said: "I'm grateful that someone like Jeremy Corbyn is running" and called him "the last stand that England has got".

In 2024, she endorsed Donald Trump's US presidential campaign following the withdrawal of Robert F. Kennedy Jr., also expressing support for Kennedy as a future US leader (though later clarifying that she is not a US voter herself).

=== Media ===
M.I.A.'s relationship with some media outlets has been controversial. M.I.A. confronted Pitchfork Media in 2007, citing sexism and racist mechanisms as possible reasons for misattribution of some of her work in her career. In 2010, M.I.A. tweeted "Fuck the New York Times", after The New York Times published a critical article by Lynn Hirschberg about M.I.A. and the conflict that portrayed the musician as politically naive and hypocritical. Both M.I.A. and several pop culture media outlets were highly critical of Hirschberg's article and reporting. Hirschberg later published a correction, apologizing for reporting quotes made by the artist out of order. Rob Horning, writing for PopMatters, believed that Hirschberg's incorrect quotes were a deliberate effort to defame the artist. M.I.A. responded on her Twitter account, posting of a telephone number and asking followers to call in and give feedback on the piece, and the revelatory content of the conversations, which she secretly taped. In 2010, she expressed disappointment that WikiLeaks distributed their documents to other news publications—including The New York Times—to gain wider coverage, as she stated their "way of reporting" did not work.

=== Philanthropy ===
M.I.A. supports a number of charities, both publicly and privately. She funded Youth Action International to help youth break out of cycles of violence and poverty in war torn African communities and set up school-building projects in Liberia in 2006. She supports the Unstoppable Foundation, co-funding the establishment of the Becky Primary School in Liberia. During her visit to Liberia she met the then President of Liberia and rehabilitated ex-child soldiers. She also appeared as part of a humanitarian mission there, hosting a 4Real TV-series documentary on the post-war situation in the country with activist Kimmie Weeks. Following her performance at the 2008 MTV Movie Awards afterparty, she donated her $100,000 performance fee to building more schools in the country, telling the crowd, "It costs $52,000 to build a school for 1,000." Winning the 2008 Official Soundclash Championships (iPod Battle) with her "M.I.A. and Friends" team, 20% of the following year's championship ticket sales were donated to her Liberian school building projects.

M.I.A. has also donated to The Pablove Foundation to fund paediatric cancer research, aid cancer families, and improve the quality of life for children living with cancer through creative arts programmes. In 2009, she supported the "Mercy Mission to Vanni" aid ship, destined to send civilian aid from Britain to Vanni and controversially blocked from reaching its destination. The country's navy announced that it would fire on any ship that entered its waters, and M.I.A. was singled out on the Sri Lankan army's official website after the singer announced her support for the campaign. In 2011, following her performance at the Roskilde Festival, she donated from the Roskilde Festival Charity Society to help bring justice to Tamil victims of war crimes and genocide and to aid advocacy and ensure legal rights for refugees and witnesses.

== Personal life ==
M.I.A. met DJ Diplo at Fabric in London, in 2003, and the two were romantically involved for five years.

From 2006 to 2008, M.I.A. lived in the Bedford–Stuyvesant neighbourhood of Brooklyn, New York City. There, she met Benjamin Bronfman, an American scion of the Bronfman business family and the Lehman banking family which founded Lehman Brothers. They began dating in December 2007, and became engaged four months later. She gave birth to a son in February 2009. In February 2012, it was reported that she and Bronfman had separated.

M.I.A. was raised by her parents as a Hindu. She revealed that in 2017 she became a born-again Christian after seeing a vision of Jesus Christ.

== Discography ==
- Arular (2005)
- Kala (2007)
- Maya (2010)
- Matangi (2013)
- AIM (2016)
- Mata (2022)
- M.I.7 (2026)

== Tours ==
- Arular Tour (2005)
- Kala Tour (2007)
- People vs. Money Tour (2008)
- Maya Tour (2010)
- Matangi Tour (2013–2014)
- AIM Tour (2017–2018)

== Honours, awards and nominations ==
M.I.A. has been nominated for Academy Award, Grammy Award, Brit Award, Mercury Prize and Alternative Turner Prize, and the first artist of Sri Lankan-British descent to be nominated for an Academy and Grammy Award in the same year. She has also been nominated for an MOBO Award, MTV Video Music Award, and MTV Europe Music Award.

She was appointed Member of the Order of the British Empire (MBE) in the 2019 Birthday Honours for her services to music. She accepted it in honour of her mother who had "spent her life in England hand sewing thousands of medals for the Queen". In 2022, she received an honorary award from University of the Arts London for outstanding contributions to the creative industries.

== Sources and further reading ==
- Aksomitis, Linda (2007). Downloading Music. Detroit: Greenhaven Press. ISBN 978-0-7377-3646-5.
- Arulpragasam, Maya (2002). M.I.A. No. 10 (Paperback ed.). Pocko Editions. ISBN 1-903977-10-X
- Bennett, Andy; Stratton, Jon (2010). Britpop and the English Music Tradition. Ashgate Publishing. pp. 6–7. ISBN 978-0-7546-6805-3. OCLC 663973447.
- Beres, Derek (2005). Global beat fusion: the history of the future of music. Lincoln, Neb.: iUniverse. pp. 20–21, 194. ISBN 978-0-595-34899-2. OCLC 62334812.
- Beth Ray, Mary (2011). Rock Brands: Selling Sound in a Media Saturated Culture. Rowman & Littlefield: Lexington Books. p. 242. ISBN 978-0-7391-4634-7. OCLC 664667183.
- Bradley, Adam; DuBois, Andrew (2010). The Anthology of Rap. Yale University Press. ISBN 978-0-300-14190-0.
- Dodero, Camille (22 October 2007). "CMJ: This is Another Piece About M.I.A. at Terminal 5". The Village Voice.
- Frere-Jones, Sasha (22 November 2004). "Bingo in Swansea – Maya Arulpragasam's World". The New Yorker.
- Gibney, Mark; Loescher, Gil (2010). Global refugee crisis: a reference handbook (second ed.). Santa Barbara, Calif. : ABC-CLIO. ISBN 978-1-59884-455-9. OCLC 639162716.
- Haddad, Candice (2011). In the limelight and under the microscope: forms and functions of female celebrity. Continuum International Publishing Group. ISBN 978-1-4411-5495-8.
- Harvilla, Rob (20 January 2009). "How M.I.A. (and America) Got Her Swagger Back". The Village Voice.
- Longhurst, Brian (2007). Popular music and society. Cambridge, UK: UK Polity Press. p. 146. ISBN 978-0-7456-3162-2. OCLC 237190093.
- Low, Bronwen (2011). Slam School: Learning Through Conflict in the Hip-Hop and Spoken Word Classroom. Palo Alto: Stanford University Press. pp. 157–158. ISBN 978-0-8047-7753-7.
- Meyers, Michael; Emig, Rainer (2009). "Missing in Act(i)on: Asian British Pop music between resistance and commercialisation". Word & image in colonial and postcolonial literatures and cultures. Rodopi Publishers. pp. 261–273. ISBN 978-90-420-2743-5.
- Novoselic, Krist (2 June 2009). "Music: The Great Messenger: How My Story's Similar to M.I.A". Seattle Weekly. Archived from the original on 27 March 2012.
- Orlov, Piotr (2004–2005). "Interview with M.I.A. from Arthur Magazine". Arthur. Vol. 16.
- Smith, Courtney E. (2011). Record collecting for girls: unleashing your inner music nerd, one album at a time. Boston: Houghton Mifflin Harcourt. ISBN 978-0-547-50223-6. OCLC 694830145.
- Weems, Lisa (2011). Postcolonial challenges in education. New York: Peter Lang. ISBN 978-1-4331-0649-1.
- Mahindru, Megha (25 October 2016). "Why India is the inspiration for rapper M.I.A.'s latest studio album". Vogue India.
