= List of awards and nominations received by M.I.A. =

M.I.A. awards and nominations
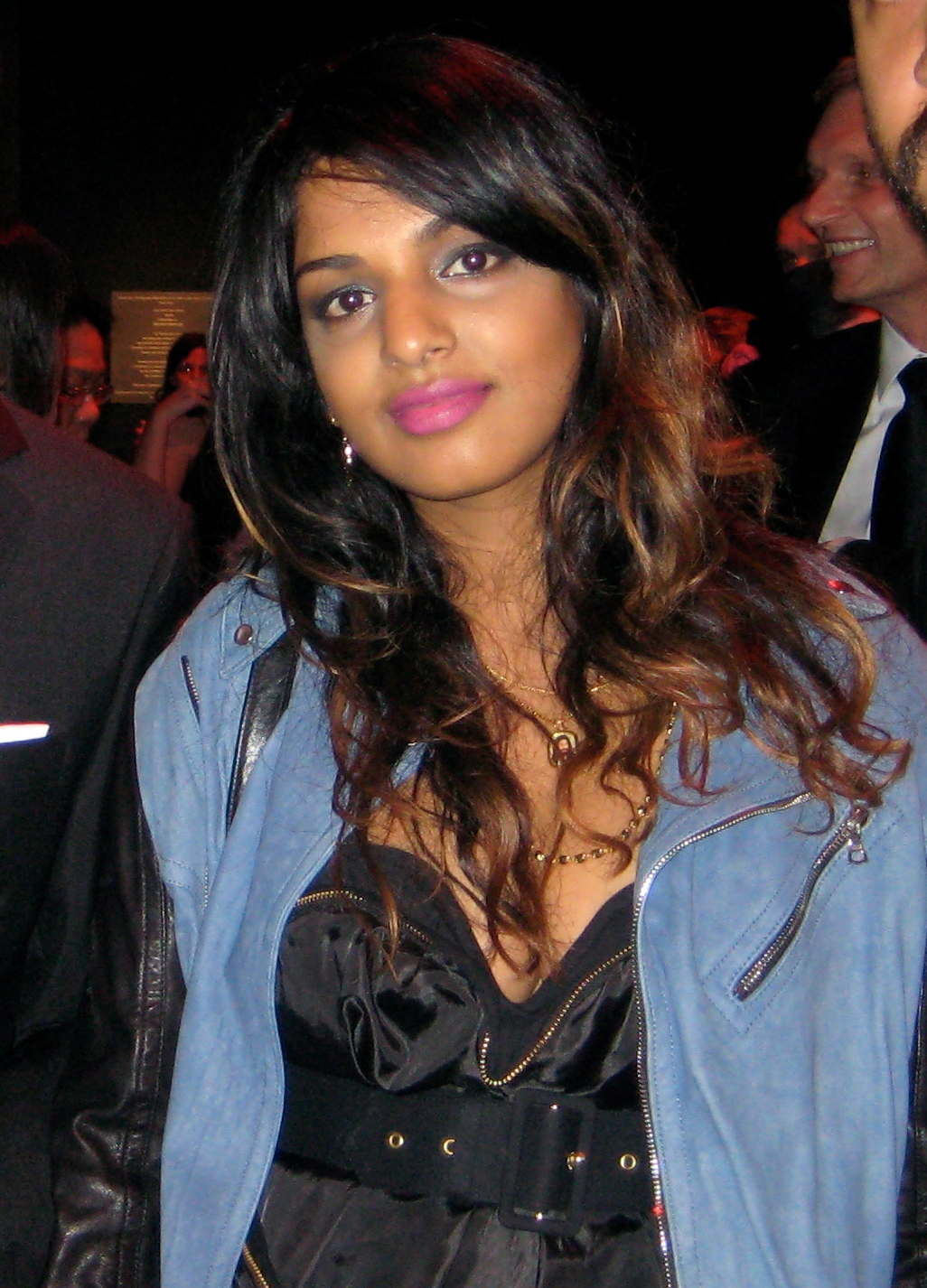
- M.I.A. at the Time 100 Gala in New York City on 5 May 2009
Awards and nominations
Award	Wins	Nominations
BET	1	2
Billboard	0	1
Brit	0	1
Grammy	0	3
MOBO	0	3
MTV Europe	0	1
MTV VMA	3	5

Totals (Note: Certain award groups do not simply award one winner. They acknowledge several different recipients, have runners-up, and have third place. Since this is a specific recognition and is different from losing an award, runner-up mentions are considered wins in this award tally. For simplification and to avoid errors, each award in this list has been presumed to have had a prior nomination.)
- Wins: 28
- Nominations: 70

M.I.A is an English recording artist, songwriter, painter and director of Tamil descent. Her compositions combine elements of electronic, dance, alternative, hip hop and world music. She has been nominated for various awards including Academy Award, MOBO Award, MTV Video Music Award, MTV Europe Music Award, Grammy Award and the prestigious Mercury Prize. She is the only artist in history to be nominated for an Academy Award, Grammy Award, Brit Award, Mercury Prize and Alternative Turner Prize, and the first artist of Asian descent to be nominated for an Academy and Grammy Award in the same year. Her award-winning career spans 13 years. This is the list of awards and nominations received by her.

== Art ==
=== Alternative Prize ===
Year	Nominated work	Award	Result
2002	M.I.A.'s Visual Art	Alternative Turner Prize	Nominated

== Film ==
=== Sundance Film Festival ===
Year	Nominated work	Award	Result
2018	Matangi/Maya/M.I.A.	World Cinema Documentary Special Jury Award	Won
2018	Matangi/Maya/M.I.A.	World Cinema Documentary Grand Jury Prize	Nominated

== Music ==
=== Academy Awards ===
The Academy Awards, informally known as The Oscars, are a set of awards given annually for excellence of cinematic achievements. The Oscar statuette is officially named the Academy Award of Merit and is one of nine types of Academy Awards. M.I.A. has received one nomination for O...Saya from the motion picture Slumdog Millionaire.

Year	Nominated work	Award	Result
2008	"O... Saya"	Best Original Song	Nominated

=== ASCAP ===
Year	Nominated work	Award	Result
2009	"Paper Planes"	PRS Award	Won
2009	"Swagga Like Us"	PRS Award	Won

=== Asian Music Awards ===
M.I.A. has received 2 nominations in 2012.

Year	Nominated work	Award	Result
2012	"Bad Girls"	Best Video	Won
2012	Herself	Best Female	Nominated

=== Antville Music Video Awards ===
The Antville Music Video Awards are online awards for the best music video and music video directors of the year. They were first awarded in 2005. M.I.A. has received six awards from seven nominations.

Year	Nominee / work	Award	Result
2010	"Born Free"	Video of the Year	Won
2010	"Born Free"	Best Editing	Won
2010	"Born Free"	Best Cinematography	Won
2012	"Bad Girls"	Best Cinematography	Won
2012	"Bad Girls"	Best Performance	Won
2012	"Bad Girls"	Video of the Year	Won
2015	"Borders"	Video of the Year	Nominated

=== BBC Radio 3 Award for World Music ===
The BBC Radio 3 Awards for World Music was an award given to world music artists between 2002 and 2008, sponsored by BBC Radio 3.

Year	Nominated work	Award	Result
2006	Herself	Club Global	Nominated

=== BET Awards ===
The BET Awards were established in 2001 by the Black Entertainment Television network to celebrate African Americans and other minorities in music, acting, sports, and other fields of entertainment over the past year. M.I.A. has received 1 award from 2 nominations.

Year	Nominated work	Award	Result
2009	Herself	Best Female Hip-Hop Artist	Won
2009	Herself	Best New Artist	Nominated

=== Billboard Awards ===
==== Billboard Mid Year Awards ====
Year	Nominated work	Award	Result
2012	"2012 Super Bowl M.I.A. Controversy"	Most Shocking Moment	Nominated

==== Billboard Music Awards ====
Year	Nominee / work	Award	Result	Ref.
2007	M.I.A.	Top Electronic Artist	Nominated	
2007	Kala	Top Electronic Album	Nominated	
2008	M.I.A.	Top Hot Dance Singles Sales Artist	Nominated	
2008	M.I.A.	Top Electronic Artist	Won	
2008	Kala	Top Electronic Album	Won	
2008	"Paper Planes"	Top Hot Dance Single Sales	Nominated	

=== BT Digital Music Awards ===
The BT Digital Music Awards (DMA) were created in the UK in 2001 and are held annually. M.I.A. has received one nomination.

Year	Nominated work	Award	Result
2008	Herself	Best Urban Artist	Nominated

=== Berlin Music Video Awards ===
The Berlin Music Video Awards (BMVAs) are an annual festival that puts filmmakers and the art behind music videos in the spotlight.

Year	Nominee / work	Award	Result
2015	"Double Bubble Trouble"	Best Concept	Nominated

=== Brit Awards ===
The Brit Awards are the British Phonographic Industry's (BPI) annual pop music awards.

Year	Nominee / work	Award	Result	Ref.
2009	Herself	British Female Solo Artist	Nominated	

=== Canadian Independent Music Awards ===
The Canadian Independent Music Awards, also known as the Independent Music Awards or Indies, are presented annually to musical artists and bands to acknowledge their artistic and technical achievements in all aspects of music. M.I.A. has received 1 award from 4 nominations.

Year	Nominated work	Award	Result
2006	Herself	International Artist/ Group of the Year	Nominated
2008	Herself	International Group/Duo/Artist of the Year	Nominated
2008	"Kala (album)"	International Album of the Year	Nominated
2009	"Paper Planes"	Indie Award for Favorite International Single	Won

=== D&AD Awards ===
Design and Art Direction (D&AD) is a British educational charity which exists to promote excellence in design and advertising.

Year	Nominee / work	Award	Result
2011	"Born Free"	Music Video	Graphite Pencil
2011	"Born Free"	Cinematography	Graphite Pencil

=== Danish Music Awards ===
The Danish Music Awards (DMA) is a Danish award show. M.I.A. has received one nomination.

Year	Nominee / work	Award	Result
2006	Herself	Best International Newcomer	Nominated

=== Grammy Awards ===
A Grammy Award (originally called Gramophone Award) – or Grammy – is an accolade by the National Academy of Recording Arts and Sciences of the United States to recognize outstanding achievement in the music industry. M.I.A. received 3 nominations.

Year	Nominated work	Award	Result
2009	"Paper Planes"	Record of the Year	Nominated
2009	"Swagga Like Us" (as songwriter)	Best Rap Song	Nominated
2013	"Bad Girls"	Best Short Form Music Video	Nominated

=== Groovelot Music and Fashion Awards ===
Year	Nominated work	Award	Result
2005	"Arular"	Album of The Year	Nominated

=== Hollywood Music Video Awards ===
Year	Nominated work	Award	Result	Ref.
2025	"Marigold"	Best Concept	Nominated	
2025	"Marigold"	Best Visual Effects	Nominated	

=== Hungarian Music Awards ===
The Hungarian Music Awards is the national music awards of Hungary, held every year since 1992 and promoted by Mahasz.

Year	Nominated work	Award	Result	Ref.
2021	"Franchise" (with Travis Scott & Young Thug)	Best Foreign Rap or Hip-Hop Recording	Nominated	

=== Ibiza Music Video Festiva ===
Ibiza Music Video Festival is the online music video competition. Rupert Bryan and Elizabeth Fear founded the event in 2013.

Year	Nominee / work	Award	Result
2017	"P.O.W.A."	Best Choreography	Nominated

=== International Dance Music Awards ===
The International Dance Music Award was established in 1985. It is a part of the Winter Music Conference, a weeklong electronic music event held annually.

Year	Nominee / work	Award	Result
2008	"Boyz"	Best Dance Music Video	Nominated
2009	"Paper Planes"	Best Rap/Hip-Hop Dance Track	Nominated

=== Ivor Novello Awards ===
The Ivor Novello Awards are awarded for songwriting and composing. The awards, named after the Cardiff born entertainer Ivor Novello, are presented annually in London by the British Academy of Songwriters, Composers and Authors (BASCA).

Year	Nominee / work	Award	Result
2009	"Paper Planes"	Best Selling UK Single	Nominated

=== Mercury Prize ===
The Mercury Prize, formerly called the Mercury Music Prize and currently known as the Barclaycard Mercury Prize for sponsorship reasons, is an annual music prize awarded for the best album from the United Kingdom and Ireland. M.I.A. has received 1 nomination in 2005.

Year	Nominated work	Award	Result
2005	"Arular"	Album of The Year	Nominated

=== MTV Awards ===
==== MTV Europe Music Awards ====
The MTV Europe Music Awards ("EMAs") were established in 1994 by MTV Networks Europe to celebrate the most popular music videos in Europe.

Year	Nominated work	Award	Result
2012	"Bad Girls"	Best Video	Nominated

==== MTV Video Music Awards ====
An MTV Video Music Award (commonly abbreviated as a VMA) is an award presented by the cable channel MTV to honor the best in music videos. M.I.A. has received 3 awards from 5 nominations.

Year	Nominated work	Award	Result
2012	"Bad Girls"	Video of the Year	Nominated
2012	"Bad Girls"	Best Direction	Won
2012	"Bad Girls"	Best Cinematography	Won
2021	"Franchise" (with Travis Scott and Young Thug)	Best Hip Hop	Won
2021	"Franchise" (with Travis Scott and Young Thug)	Best Direction	Nominated

==== MTV O Music Awards ====
M.I.A. received one nomination in 2012.

Year	Nominated work	Award	Result
2012	"M.I.A. flips the bird at Super Bowl"	Most F***ed up Performance Gone Viral	Nominated

==== mtvU Woodie Awards ====
Year	Nominated work	Award	Result
2005	Herself	Left Field Woodie (Most Original Artist)	Nominated
2007	"Boyz"	Viral Woodie	Nominated

==== MVPA Awards ====
Year	Nominee / work	Award	Result
2012	"Bad Girls"	Best International Video	Won

=== MOBO Awards ===
The Music of Black Origin Awards, established in 1996 by Kanya King MBE and Andy Ruffell, are held annually in the United Kingdom to recognise artists of any ethnicity or nationality performing black music.

Year	Nominated work	Award	Result
2008	Herself	Best UK Female	Nominated
2010	Herself	Best UK Act	Nominated
2016	"Borders" Directed & Performed by M.I.A.	Best Video	Nominated

=== NME Awards ===
The NME Awards are an annual music awards show, founded by the music magazine NME.

Year	Nominee / work	Award	Result
2013	"Bad Girls"	Best Track	Nominated
2013	"Bad Girls"	Best Music Video	Nominated
2013	"Bad Girls"	Best Dancefloor Anthem	Nominated
2013	@MIAuniverse	Best Twitter	Nominated
2017	M.I.A	Best British Female	Won

=== Q Awards ===
The Q Awards are the UK's annual music awards run by the music magazine Q.

Year	Nominated work	Award	Result
2005	Herself	Best New Act	Nominated
2016	Herself	Innovation In Sound	Won

=== Rober Awards Music Prize ===
Year	Nominee / work	Award	Result
2007	"Jimmy"	Best Cover Version	Won
2008	"Paper Planes"	Song of the Year	Won
2008	Herself	Best Hip-Hop	Won
2010	"Born Free"	Best Promo Video	Nominated
2012	"Bad Girls"	Best Promo Video	Nominated
2015	"Borders"	Best Promo Video	Nominated

=== Shortlist Music Prize ===
The Shortlist Music Prize, stylized as (shôrt–lĭst), was an annual music award for the best album released in the United States that had sold fewer than 500,000 copies at the time of nomination.

Year	Nominated work	Award	Result
2005	"Arular"	Best Album	Nominated
2010	"Kala"	Best Album	Nominated

=== South Bank Show Awards ===
Year	Nominated work	Award	Result
2005	Herself	Breakthrough Award	Nominated

=== UK Asian Music Awards ===
The UK Asian Music Awards, also known by the abbreviation UK AMA, is an awards show that is held annually in the United Kingdom since 2002. M.I.A. has received 3 nominations.

Year	Nominated work	Award	Result
2009	Herself	Best Female Act	Won
2009	Herself	Best Urban Act	Nominated
2011	Herself	Best Urban Act	Nominated
2011	Herself	Best Female Act	Nominated
2011	"XXXO"	Best Video	Nominated
2012	"Bad Girls"	Best Video	Won

=== UK Festival Awards ===
Year	Nominee / work	Award	Result	Ref.
2010	The Big Chill	Best Headline Performance	Nominated	
2010	Underage Festival	Best Headline Performance	Nominated	

=== UK Music Video Awards ===
The UK Music Video Awards is an annual award ceremony founded in 2008 to recognise creativity, technical excellence and innovation in music videos and moving images for music. M.I.A. has received three awards from nine nominations.

Year	Nominee / work	Award	Result
2010	"Born Free"	Best Dance Video	Nominated
2012	"Bad Girls"	Video of the Year	Won
2012	"Bad Girls"	Best Pop Video	Won
2012	"Bad Girls"	Best Styling	Won
2012	"Bad Girls"	Best Art Direction	Nominated
2012	"Bad Girls"	Best Cinematography	Nominated
2012	"Bad Girls"	Best Editing	Nominated
2014	"Double Bubble Trouble"	Best Urban Video - UK	Nominated
2021	"Franchise" (with Travis Scott and Young Thug)	Best Hip Hop/Grime/Rap Video - International	Nominated

== XM Nation Music Awards ==
Awarded annually by XM Satellite Radio since 2005, the XM Nation Music Awards "honor some of the most talented and interesting musicians today."

Year	Nominee / work	Award	Result
2005	Herself	Most Important Indie Emerging Artist	Won
