= Popular (M.I.A. song) =

Single by M.I.A.

from the album Mata
- Released: 12 August 2022
- Genre: Alternative hip hop; reggaeton
- Length: 3:06
- Label: Island
- Songwriters: Boaz de Jong; Maya Arulpragasam; Thomas Wesley; Pentz
- Producers: Diplo; Boaz van de Beatz

M.I.A. singles chronology
"The One" (2022)	"Popular" (2022)	"Beep" (2022)

Music video
- "Popular" on YouTube

"Popular" is a song by British rapper M.I.A. It was released on 12 August 2022 as the second single from her sixth studio album Mata.

== Music video ==
The official music video for the song was directed by Arnaud Bresson. It stars what was described as an "influencer-bot-in-training" named M.A.I. – a pun alluding to artificial intelligence. In the video, the singer trains her robot alter ego to dance to the title song. In the end, she kills it with a water gun. The video was released on 12 August 2022.

== Track listing ==
- Digital download
1. "Popular" – 3:06
- Streaming
1. "Popular" – 3:06
2. "The One" – 2:25

== Charts ==
Chart performance for "Popular"
Chart (2022)	Peak position
UK Asian Music (Official Charts Company)	11
