= The One (M.I.A. song) =

Single by M.I.A.

from the album Mata
- Released: 26 May 2022
- Genre: Trap
- Length: 2:25
- Songwriters: Everett Romano; Mathangi Arulpragasam; Rex Kudo; Ryan Vojtesak; Tyler Williams
- Producers: T-Minus; Rex Kudo; Charlie Handsome; Heavy Mellow

M.I.A. singles chronology
"CTRL" (2020)	"The One" (2022)	"Popular" (2022)

Music video
- "The One" on YouTube

"The One" (also titled "The 1") is a song by British rapper M.I.A. It was released on 26 May 2022, and is the lead single from her sixth studio album Mata.

== Background ==
Prior to the release of "The One", M.I.A. performed the song at Just Like Heaven festival on 21 May 2022 along with another MATA track "Marigold". She told Zane Lowe of Apple Music 1 in a live radio interview that the song "is just about sticking to what you are and the truth. I think, at the end of the day, that is also what this record is about to me, is still trying to find truth."

== Charts ==
Chart performance for "The One"
Chart (2022)	Peak position
UK Asian Music Chart (Official Charts Company)	7
US Hot Dance/Electronic Songs (Billboard)	29
