= Mata (album) =

Studio album by M.I.A.
- Released: 14 October 2022
- Recorded: 2018–2022
- Studios: London; Los Angeles; Italy; Bali; Jakarta; Saint Vincent
- Genres: Electronic; hip-hop; world
- Length: 33:02
- Label: Island
- Producers: Boaz van de Beatz; Cadenza; Comber; Charlie Handsome; Dale Dizzle Virgo; Heavy Mellow; Jaegen; Maher Woo-Shear; M.I.A.; Munchi; P2J; Pharrell; Rex Kudo; Rick Rubin; Skrillex; Swick; T-Minus; Tropkillaz; Troy Baker

M.I.A. chronology
| AIM (2016) | Mata (2022) | Bells Collection (2023) |

Singles from Mata
- 1. "The One" Released: 26 May 2022; 2. "Popular" Released: 12 August 2022; 3. "Beep" Released: 30 September 2022; 4. "Marigold" Released: 24 December 2024

Mata (stylised in all caps) is the sixth studio album by English recording artist M.I.A. It was released on 14 October 2022 through Island Records, marking her first album release for six years. M.I.A. worked with a number of producers on the album, including Skrillex and long-time collaborator Diplo, and recorded tracks in various locations around the world. As with M.I.A.'s earlier releases, the album mixes Eastern and Western musical influences, with styles such as moombahton and bhangra incorporated into the music. Mata received generally positive reviews from music critics but, unlike her previous albums, it did not enter the album charts in either the UK or US.

== Background ==
In September 2016, M.I.A. released her fifth studio album AIM, which was originally promoted as being her final studio album. In 2019, however, M.I.A. revealed that she had begun working on a new studio album. On 31 January 2020, she launched a Patreon page to fund new music, stating that her upcoming album was "nearly finished". On 22 March 2020, coinciding with the release of "OHMNI 202091", her first song in three years, she suggested that a new record would arrive later the same year. She released another track, "Babylon", in 2021, but there was little further news about the album.

Tracks for the album were recorded in various locations around the world, including London, Los Angeles, Italy, Bali, Jakarta, and Saint Vincent. Navz-47, an artist of Sri Lankan descent like M.I.A., provided vocals on the track "Puththi". Another track created for the album, "Tribe", featured rapper Juice Wrld, who died in December 2019, but it was dropped at the last minute. Doja Cat and Nicki Minaj were also reportedly set to appear on the album with M.I.A. claiming that she had "had to wait 2 years for [their verses]... never mind". She worked with various producers, including Skrillex, Rex Kudo, T-Minus, and Heavy Mellow, as well as Diplo, with whom she had collaborated intermittently since 2004.

== Music and lyrics ==
As with M.I.A.'s earlier releases, the album mixes Eastern and Western musical influences. The album incorporates a range of world music styles, including moombahton on "Beep" and reggaeton on "Popular". "Energy Freq" incorporates bhangra and vocals from a Tamil film; Saeed Saeed of Abu Dhabi's The National opined that the song could be "this generation's version of Punjabi MC's [sic] 2002 hit 'Mundian To Bach Ke'." The track "100% Sustainable" incorporates a field recording of a Tamil choir. "K.T.P. (Keep the Peace)" contains a sample of the 2003 song "Maps" by rock band Yeah Yeah Yeahs. Lyrically, "Zoo Girl" contains references to the rapper's status as a Sri Lankan refugee, calling her a "zoo girl straight out the wild, wild East". "Time Traveller" refers to the vimana, a mythical flying palace mentioned in Hindu texts.

== Release and artwork ==
M.I.A. had considered naming the album Ikhyd after her son. On 31 October 2021, however, she officially announced the album title through an Instagram post stating "to reflect where I am and what we want to build, I'm proud to announce starting today my LP is now Mata." The post was a parody of the announcement earlier in the month that the company which operates Facebook was changing its name to Meta. The album was released on 14 October 2022. The album cover features a logo with the T resembling a Christian cross; the singer had revealed earlier in the year that she had become a born-again Christian.

== Promotion ==
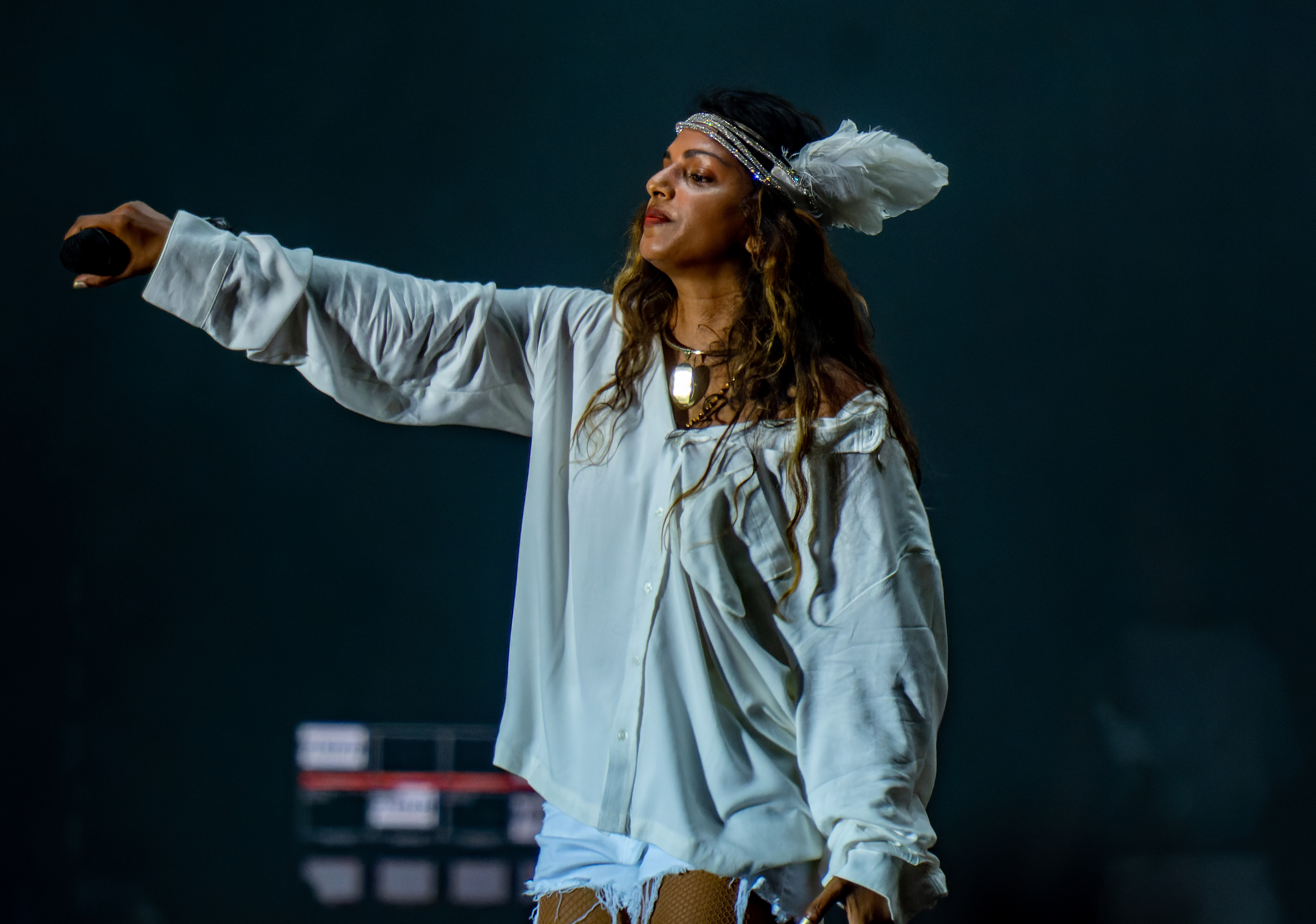
M.I.A. performing live in 2022

"The One" was released on 26 May 2022 as the lead single from the album along with its music video. Prior to the release of the single, M.I.A. performed it at Just Like Heaven festival. "Popular" was released as the album's second single on 12 August 2022. It was announced three days prior to its release and was accompanied by a video featuring M.I.A.'s "robotic double" M.A.I. "Beep" was released as the third single from the album on 30 September 2022; the track also featured on the soundtrack of football video game FIFA 23.

== Critical reception ==
Professional ratings
Review scores
| Source | Rating |
|---|---|
| AllMusic | 4/5 stars |
| And It Don't Stop | A− |
| Slant Magazine | 4/5 stars |

In a review for AllMusic, Heather Phares concluded that, "six albums in, M.I.A. still has a remarkable gift for tapping into the emotions behind the issues" and that by "focusing on that skill makes MATA one of her most consistent albums, and not so much a safe return as a savvy one". Writing for Rolling Stone, Michelle Hyun Kim wrote that the album "reminds listeners of the novelty of [M.I.A.'s] pioneering music style" but criticised the lyrical content, saying "Yes, M.I.A. is still here, but it's unclear whether she has anything new to say." Shaad D'Souza of The Guardian stated that the album "may be MIA's most contemplative record, recalling lyrical themes from every part of her career" but that it was "very clearly not an attempt to re-enter the mainstream pop world she was orbiting in the 2010s". Slant Magazine's Sam C. Mac called it an album of "exhilarating musical riches" and praised the juxtaposition of "sociopolitical commentary and personal identity". Robert Christgau, reviewing in his "Consumer Guide," conceded that while she is "always longer on political instinct than political acuity", Mata proves again the distinctiveness of her "hip-hop groove and rap dialect" alongside "brags beyond the reach of any rival".

== Track listing ==
Mata track listing
| No. | Title | Writer(s) | Producer(s) | Length |
|---|---|---|---|---|
| 1. | "F.I.A.S.O.M. Pt. 1" | Maya Arulpragasam; Rayiv Münch | M.I.A.; Munchi | 1:30 |
| 2. | "F.I.A.S.O.M. Pt. 2" | Arulpragasam; Danny Omerhodic | Swick; Comber^{[a]} | 2:49 |
| 3. | "100% Sustainable" | Arulpragasam | M.I.A.; Comber^{[a]} | 2:23 |
| 4. | "Beep" | Arulpragasam; Skrillex; Rex Kudo; Michael Roshan; Maher Sakari; Jagvir Aujla | Skrillex; Kudo; Rick Rubin; Jaegen; Maher Woo-Shear | 2:01 |
| 5. | "Energy Freq" | Arulpragasam; Ilaiyaraaja; Marlon Roudette; Münch | Munchi | 2:45 |
| 6. | "The One" | Everett Romano; Arulpragasam; Kudo; Ryan Vojtesak; Tyler Williams | T-Minus; Kudo; Charlie Handsome^{[a]}; Heavy Mellow^{[a]} | 2:26 |
| 7. | "Zoo Girl" | Arulpragasam; Oliver Rodigan; P2J; Tropkillaz | Cadenza; P2J; Tropkillaz | 2:52 |
| 8. | "Time Traveller" | Arulpragasam; Pharrell; Robert John Richardson | Pharrell | 3:03 |
| 9. | "Popular" | Boaz de Jong; Arulpragasam; Thomas Wesley Pentz; Gia Koka | Diplo; Boaz van de Beatz | 3:07 |
| 10. | "Puththi" (featuring Navz-47) | Arulpragasam; Omerhodic; Munch; Navz-47 | Munchi | 2:40 |
| 11. | "K.T.P. (Keep the Peace)" | Arulpragasam; Brian Chase; Karen Orzolek; Nicholas Joseph Zinner; Kudo; Vojtesak; Skrillex | Handsome; Rex Kudo; Rubin; Skrillex | 2:15 |
| 12. | "Mata Life" | Arulpragasam; Raaja; Troy Baker; Vairamuthu | Dale Dizzle Virgo; Baker | 1:32 |
| 13. | "Marigold" | Arulpragasam; Everett Romano; Kudo; Rubin; Skrillex; Symere Woods; Zacari Pacaldo | Heavy Mellow; Kudo; Skrillex; Lil Uzi Vert^{[c]}; Rubin^{[c]}; Skrillex; Cisco Adler^{[a]} | 3:36 |
| Total length: | | | | 33:02 |

Notes

- ^{^[a]} signifies an additional producer
- ^{^[c]} signifies a co-producer

== Personnel ==
Musicians

- M.I.A. – vocals (all tracks), programming (track 3)
- Neil Comber – programming (1–3)
- Swick – programming (2, 10); bass, drums, keyboards, percussion (2)
- Dale – additional vocals (2)
- Shiera – additional vocals (2, 10)
- Mustafa – background vocals (4)
- Saint Raavan – background vocals (4)
- Maher Woo-Shear – bass, guitar, keyboards (4)
- Rex Kudo – keyboards, programming (6)
- Peter Lee Johnson – keyboards (6)
- T-Minus – keyboards, programming (6)
- P2J – programming (7)
- Tropkillaz – programming (7)
- Cadenza – programming (7)
- Mike Larson – programming (8)
- Boaz de Jong – bass, drums, horn, keyboards, percussion, programming (9)
- Diplo – drums, programming (9)
- Navz-47 – background vocals (10)
- Munchi – programming (10)
- Capital Children's Choir – additional vocals (11)
- Lil Uzi Vert – background vocals (13)

Technical

- Mike Bozzi – mastering
- Manny Marroquin – mixing (1, 3–8, 10, 11, 13)
- Swick – mixing (2)
- Boaz de Jong – mixing, engineering (9)
- Troy Baker – mixing (12)
- Dale Virgo – mixing (12)
- Skrillex – mixing (13)
- Neil Comber – engineering (1–3)
- Danny Omerhodic – engineering (2, 10)
- Maher Wo-sher – engineering (4)
- Cadenza – engineering (7), engineering assistance (8)
- Mike Larson – engineering (8)
- Timothy Kawa – engineering (12)
- Trey Station – mixing assistance (1, 3, 7, 8, 10, 11)
- Anthony Vilchis – mixing assistance (1, 3, 7, 8, 10, 11)
- Zach Pereya – mixing assistance (1, 3, 7, 8, 10, 11)
- Nicole Purlvirenti – engineering assistance (8)
- Daryl Johnson – engineering assistance (8)
