= Ideological exclusion =

Ideological exclusion is a term referring to the practice of restricting foreigners from entry into a country for ideological purposes.
