= P.O.W.A. =

"P.O.W.A"

Single by M.I.A.
- Released: 8 February 2017
- Length: 3:16
- Label: Interscope
- Songwriter(s): Maya Arulpragasam
- Producer(s): M.I.A.; Kid Kamillion

M.I.A. singles chronology
"Freedun" (2016)	"P.O.W.A" (2017)	"Up Inna" (2020)

Music video
- "P.O.W.A" on YouTube

"P.O.W.A" (pronounced "power") is a song by British musician M.I.A., released on 8 February 2017 by Interscope Records. The video was released alongside the single, and was directed by M.I.A.

== Background and composition ==
A "politically-charged track", "P.O.W.A" features lyrical references to Rihanna, Madonna, Mariah Carey, Ariana Grande, Barack Obama, Osama Bin Laden and the Spice Girls. The song also features chanting from M.I.A.

"P.O.W.A" samples "Blue Moon" by The Marcels.

== Music video ==
"P.O.W.A"'s music video was directed by M.I.A and shot in Jammu & Kashmir, India. It displays the singer lying on a marigold truck, wandering several different desolate landscapes in J&K, capturing the state's natural beauty while wearing vividly-colored saffron saris to reference the famous colours of J&K, and a line of men dancing against a saffron wall.
