= Hassan Iquioussen =

- الحسن إيكويسن
- Born: June 2, 1964 (age 61); Denain, France
- Occupation: Imam

Hassan Iquioussen (born June 2, 1964) (الحسن إيكويسن), in Denain, France, is a Moroccan imam and lecturer of frériste obedience, member of Musulmans de France (ex-UOIF), an organisation known to be close to the Muslim Brotherhood. He is one of the founders of the Jeunes musulmans de France (JMF).

From 2003, he sparked controversy for antisemitic and misogynistic statements. He was placed on the fiche S in February 2021 for statements favourable to Osama bin Laden.

In January 2023, he was expelled to Morocco by Belgian justice, the country to which he had fled while a judgment of the French Council of State against him was due to be rendered.

== Early life and education ==
Hassan Iquioussen was born in Denain in 1964, into a family of Moroccan expatriates.

He is originally from the Souss. His father left to work in France in the mining basin in 1936. He married in 1958 and fathered nine children. He helped set up the first mosques in the Valenciennois in modest barracks.

Hassan Iquioussen, the fifth child of this sibling group, was born in Denain, a commune in the Nord near Valenciennes. Destined to automatically acquire French nationality at his majority, he claims to have faced his father's opposition, who renounced it on his behalf during his adolescence. He states that he applied for French nationality twice, in 1984 and 1990, without success, while his brothers and sisters were able to obtain it.

After obtaining a general literary baccalauréat, he earned a licence in Arabic, a maîtrise in history on Usman dan Fodio, then abandoned his studies while pursuing a DEA in history to devote himself to Islam.

== Family life ==
At the age of 20, he married Zaina, a Moroccan born in Casablanca, sister of the wife of the essayist and imam Tareq Oubrou. Five sons were born of their union, the eldest being Soufiane Iquioussen.

On 31 October 2020, his home in Lourches was searched by the gendarmerie brigade of Valenciennes. This search followed the French government's desire to put Islamists under pressure after the murder of Samuel Paty, but also an audition of his eldest son Soufiane on 22 October 2020 in the context of an investigation into malversations around a company (Garage Solidaire du Hainaut).

== Real estate holdings ==
On 27 March 2003, Hassan and Zaina Iquioussen bought from the company Darmanin Père & Fils (directed by Claude Darmanin, paternal uncle of the future Interior Minister Gérald Darmanin) a 3.5-hectare property in Lourches, which the preacher soon transformed into a family headquarters. Devoted to livestock farming (cattle, sheep and goats), it is commonly nicknamed "the farm" by locals.

In 2022, Hassan Iquioussen declared that he was the manager of four sociétés civiles immobilières, created with his wife or children. For example, he owns "La résidence Sainte-Reine" in Denain. Renovated for 800,000 euros, it comprises 20 apartments, with one studio, five T2s and fourteen T3s.

== Career as a preacher ==
He began preaching at the age of 17, quickly gaining some notoriety thanks to his father. He trained as an autodidact, then was taken in hand by Dr Mohammed Jamal, who structured the hard core of the frériste movement in the region, of which Amar Lasfar (then Amar Asfar) became the leader at the time.

He became, with Hani Ramadan, one of the first two flagship French-language preachers.

He is one of the founders of the Jeunes musulmans de France (JMF) and was nicknamed the "prêcheur des cités". Accusing the Union des organisations islamiques de France (UOIF) of being taken over by the Moroccan branch of the Muslim Brotherhood, Al Adl Wal Ihsane, the JMF decided to break organically with it. In October 1994, he was part of the intégristes who encouraged several young Maghrebi women to keep their hijab at the lycée Faidherbe in Lille while the establishment wanted to ban it under a circular from the Minister of National Education, François Bayrou.

In 2004, he was professor of Muslim ethics at the lycée Averroès.

At the end of the 2000s, Hassan Iquioussen gave the "second part" of the conferences of Tariq Ramadan, with whom he is close. He was also a regular guest at the Bourget fair, organised every year by the UOIF of frériste orientation and identity, and described as the French branch of the Muslim Brotherhood.

== Relations with French authorities ==
At the beginning of 2014, he took part with his son in a pre-municipal election dinner in a private home in the Gambetta district of Tourcoing. This meeting, organised in the presence of around ten other influential personalities within the local Muslim community as well as the UMP candidate for mayor Gérald Darmanin, aimed to bring the votes of the Muslims of Tourcoing into the latter's fold, with whom Iquioussen declared he agreed on 99.9% of conversation topics.

From February 2021, he was the subject of a fiche S. A few months later, he was sentenced to 3 months in prison with suspended sentence for irregular ritual slaughter on his property in Lourches.

At the end of January 2022, a witness told Le Figaro that Hassan Iquioussen preached armed jihad and the fight against France in conferences organised in the premises of the AAIR (Ambitions et initiatives pour la réussite), a controversial Roubaisienne association.

== Expulsion procedure in 2022 ==
In 2022, the prefecture of the Nord refused to renew Hassan Iquioussen's residence permit, accusing him of hateful speeches against the values of the Republic, including laïcité and equality between women and men, as well as the development of antisemitic and conspiracy theses around islamophobia.

According to his lawyer, Lucie Simon, the prefecture relies on white notes, reporting no recent or verifiable statements; the cited conferences for the most part were not recorded, while more than a thousand videos of him are available on the internet. She adds that his client's recent and numerous public positions are in favour of laïcité, male-female equality, Republican values and against xenophobia.

On 3 May 2022, he received at his home a notification bulletin of the initiation of an expulsion procedure against him. On 22 June 2022, the departmental commission for the expulsion of foreigners gave a favourable opinion after Prefect Georges-François Leclerc pleaded in his favour.

On 28 July 2022, the Minister of the Interior Gérald Darmanin announced that the imam would be expelled under the law reinforcing respect for the principles of the Republic.

According to his entourage, he had criticised the King of Morocco, something not to be done in Morocco. Upon landing, he risked trouble. He would have an interest in applying for a residence permit in another country, perhaps Belgium, to stay close to his family. Having heard of this hypothesis, the president of the Mouvement réformateur (MR) Georges-Louis Bouchez opposed his installation on Belgian territory, denouncing too much laxity around the reception of preachers of hate.

On 29 July 2022, the Minister of the Interior signed the ministerial expulsion order (AME) against the imam.

On 1 August 2022, the Moroccan authorities issued a consular laissez-passer, allowing, according to Gérald Darmanin, the expulsion manu militari of Mr Iquioussen from national territory. On 31 August 2022, the consular laissez-passer was suspended by the Moroccan authorities, who deplored a lack of consultation.

=== Administrative court referral in France ===
==== Before the Administrative Tribunal of Paris ====
On 1 August 2022, he referred the matter to the Administrative Tribunal of Paris in the context of a référé-liberté aimed at suspending the AME issued against him. In the afternoon of 4 August 2022, a public hearing was held before the court, sitting in collegiate formation for the occasion. On 5 August 2022, it decided to suspend the AME, citing a serious and manifestly disproportionate infringement of Hassan Iquioussen's right to lead a normal private and family life. According to Mediapart, which was able to consult the suspension order, the court considered that certain positions attributed by the minister to Hassan Iquioussen, such as his rejection of Western values or his supposed support for Osama bin Laden, were not established by any document in the proceedings. For the attested statements cited, they do not constitute incitement to discrimination or hatred. The statements judged retrograde on the role of women in the family could not constitute a sufficient ground for expulsion, given the repercussions on Mr Iquioussen's family life.

==== European Court of Human Rights ====
On 3 August 2022, Hassan Iquioussen's lawyer referred the matter to the European Court of Human Rights (ECtHR), which refused the next day to suspend his expulsion on the grounds that it would not entail irreparable risks for his person. Following a new referral to the ECtHR against France in September 2022, the judges rejected all of Hassan Iquioussen's requests on 15 June 2023 for inadmissibility.

==== Ministerial appeal to the Council of State ====
The Minister of the Interior announced that he would appeal the decision to the Council of State. In the event that the latter did not rule in his favour, he envisaged resorting to a change in legislation according to Sacha Houlié (LREM), president of the Law Commission of the National Assembly. On 10 August 2022, an appeal was indeed filed with the Council of State, which examined the case on 26 August 2022 and annulled the administrative order suspending the AME on 30 August 2022, considering that Hassan Iquioussen's antisemitic statements as well as his discourse on the inferiority of women and their submission to men constitute explicit and deliberate acts of incitement to discrimination or hatred justifying the expulsion decision. Gérald Darmanin welcomed the verdict, in which he saw a great victory for the Republic.

=== Departure to Belgium ===
On 30 August 2022 at 7:20 p.m., national police officers presented themselves at the home of Hassan Iquioussen, 228 rue Albert-Cousin in Lourches, with the aim of arresting him and placing him in an administrative detention centre. The person concerned, registered in the file of wanted persons, was however not present and had fled to Belgium.

=== European arrest warrant ===
On 1 September 2022, an investigating judge in Valenciennes issued a European arrest warrant against him for evading the execution of a removal decision. On 2 September 2022, Belgian Deputy Prime Minister Vincent Van Quickenborne announced that if Hassan Iquioussen were in his country, he would be expelled. On 30 September 2022, he announced his arrest by Belgian police near the town of Mons, not far from the border with France. From Cayenne (where he was attending the Security Assizes), Gérald Darmanin rejoiced at such an arrest and thanked the Belgian services very sincerely for it. Hassan Iquioussen was incarcerated in the prison of Tournai pending the Belgian courts' decision on his case. On 21 October 2022, the council chamber of the Tournai court refused his extradition to France due to the illegality of the European arrest warrant issued against him. On 27 October 2022, after nearly a month of detention, he was authorised to leave Tournai prison on condition of wearing an electronic bracelet and remaining 24 hours a day at the home of a Belgian-resident friend. On 15 November 2022, the Mons Court of Appeal confirmed the verdict rendered at first instance by the Tournai council chamber.

=== Expulsion from Belgium to Morocco ===
That same evening, Hassan Iquioussen, considered an irregular alien by the Belgian State, was placed in a closed centre in Vottem with a view to his expulsion to Morocco. Finally, in January 2023, the Belgian authorities expelled him to Casablanca in Morocco.

=== Follow-up proceedings in France ===
Shortly after his arrival in Morocco, his French lawyer recalled that the case was pending on the merits before the Administrative Tribunal of Paris and specified that if the French expulsion order were annulled, France would have to ensure his return.

On 11 March 2024, the Administrative Tribunal of Paris rejected his request for annulment of the orders of 29 July 2022 that led to his expulsion to Morocco. His lawyer indicated her intention to appeal.

=== Defamation complaint against Gérald Darmanin ===
After the imam's flight to Belgium, Gérald Darmanin having stated on the one hand that he "can no longer speak without being seen as a delinquent, a fugitive and a separatist" and on the other that he "has committed a criminal offence" by evading the administrative expulsion procedure, Hassan Iquioussen considered himself defamed and filed a complaint against the minister before the Paris judicial court.

On 16 February 2023, the 17th chamber of the Paris judicial court examined the admissibility of the complaint, as it involved proceedings against a minister in the exercise of his functions. In April 2023, the judicial court declared itself incompetent, considering that this case fell under the jurisdiction of the Court de Justice de la République.

=== Death threats against his lawyer and a judge ===
Maître Lucie Simon, Hassan Iquioussen's defence lawyer, received death threats on the internet. A complaint was filed and the Paris Public Prosecutor's Office entrusted the investigations to the Brigade for the Repression of Offences against Persons (BRDP).

In parallel, one of the three judges who signed the référé order of the Paris Administrative Tribunal annulling the expulsion order was also threatened and saw her name circulated on Twitter. She filed a complaint.

=== Public reactions ===
On 29 July 2022, the Interministerial Committee for the Prevention of Delinquency and Radicalisation (CIPDR) criticised on its Twitter account the support given to Hassan Iquioussen by Marwan Muhammad, Bilal Righi and Feïza Ben Mohamed.

In a press release published on 31 July 2022 on his Twitter account, Nord MP David Guiraud (La France insoumise) opposed the imam's expulsion, seeing in it an act of the prince and a perversion of the rule of law. On 4 August 2022, the Minister of the Interior Gérald Darmanin recommended that the La France insoumise group in the National Assembly exclude this parliamentarian who had, he believed, profoundly dishonoured French values.

On 31 July 2022, the Union juive française pour la paix (UJFP) denounced the expulsion procedure initiated against Hassan Iquioussen as a gross political manoeuvre.

On 1 August 2022, the Ligue des droits de l'homme (LDH) denounced the expulsion procedure initiated against the imam as a politico-media instrumentalisation of the law and a possible return of the lettre de cachet.

On 2 August 2022, Bouches-du-Rhône MP Manuel Bompard (LFI) declared that the expulsion of Hassan Iquioussen could not be left to the arbitrary decision of the Minister of the Interior who decides that such a statement is not acceptable.

On 3 August 2022, a tribune entitled "Refusing the expulsion of Imam Hassan Iquioussen means defending the basic principles of the rule of law" was published in Mediapart with the support of several personalities. Several local religious associations reacted and 31 mosques in the Hauts-de-France region gave their support to the preacher. The Musulmans de France federation (ex-UOIF) expressed its astonishment and incomprehension. A petition in his favour collected 21,000 signatures on 3 August 2022.

In Belgium, Franck Amin Hensch, imam of the Assahaba mosque in Verviers (the largest in Wallonia), supported Iquioussen, who had already been his guest. He presented him as a teacher who for decades has called on Muslim youth to live their faith and citizenship in a harmonious way.

On 3 September 2022, nearly 200 people gathered on Place de la République in Paris to protest against the Council of State's decision approving his expulsion.

== Positions taken ==
Bernard Godard, a specialist in Islam in France, does not consider him an imam because he has not led prayers, but he does preach in mosques; according to him he is an ideas agitator. However, he has a different discourse depending on his interlocutors.

Caroline Fourest portrayed him in an interview published in Hérodote in 2010 as a young Frenchman trained by the Union of Islamic Organisations of France, very representative of this generation of improvised imams.

In his 2018 report La fabrique de l'islamisme written for the Institut Montaigne, Hakim El Karoui described him as a representative of the hardest and most virulent tendency of the Muslim Brotherhood in France on subjects such as the status of women or relations with Jews.

According to Bernard Rougier, Hassan Iquioussen sees himself as the unconditional defender of the Egyptian-Qatari Muslim Brother Youssef al-Qaradâwî, known throughout the Arab world thanks to the programme La Charia et la Vie, long broadcast on the Qatari channel Al Jazeera.

In November 2022, while residing in Belgium, Hassan Iquioussen repented: "I said condemnable things."

=== Antisemitic statements ===
In 2003, Hassan Iquioussen gave a public conference recorded and distributed as an audio cassette under the title "La Palestine, histoire d'une injustice". In January 2004, the newspaper L'Humanité revealed the content of the statements made during this conference. Iquioussen described Jews as avaricious and usurers. He accused them of being the height of treason and felony, of plotting against Islam and Muslims, or of not wanting to mix with others whom they consider as slaves. He attributed the schism that divided Islam to a Yemeni Jew who converted to destroy Islam from within (Abdullah ibn Salam) and presented Mustafa Kemal Atatürk as a hypocritically converted Muslim for the same reason. He accused the Zionists of having pushed Hitler to do harm to German Jews to force them to leave and presented Egyptian President Anwar el-Sadat as an American agent while Yasser Arafat and his men were accused of depravity. He also praised Hassan el-Banna, the founder of the Muslim Brotherhood.

After Dominique de Villepin, then Minister of the Interior, condemned these statements, Hassan Iquioussen retracted them, stating: "I recognise having made inappropriate statements, I recognise my wrongs. I condemn my inappropriate statements. Antisemitism is a horror. [...] I give around a hundred interventions a year. It happens that I overstep, I have no scruples or shame in recognising my mistakes." Furthermore, his statements were repeated after 2004. The Council of State considers that Iquioussen's condemnation of antisemitism in 2015 was only a reaction to the emotion that his statements had aroused and without explicitly refuting these statements.

=== Statements on women ===
In 2013, Hassan Iquioussen declared in a YouTube video that a woman must do everything to try to please her husband and accept that he falls as a martyr. On 16 September 2018, during a conference at the great mosque of Rosny-sous-Bois, he asserted that women must stay at home to look after the children and their husband.

On 5 August 2022, the administrative judge who suspended Hassan Iquioussen's expulsion from French territory declared that these last statements were retrograde and constituted explicit and deliberate acts of incitement to discrimination but that they alone were not sufficient to justify expulsion. On the broader basis that followed on 30 August 2022, the Council of State considered the expulsion justified.

=== Statements on terrorism ===
In 2012, Hassan Iquioussen made conspiracy statements about the 11 September 2001 attacks and the killing committed in March 2012 by Mohamed Merah in Toulouse, which he described as pseudo-attacks directed against Muslims.

He also declared, in February 2004 during a conference in Mainvilliers (Eure-et-Loir), that Osama bin Laden was a great fighter against the Americans and a great defender of Islam, which earned him being placed on the fiche S.

=== Appeals to Muslims ===
Among the themes of his sermons, one can notably cite the call to Muslims in France to feel fully French, to get involved in political and civic life and to get out of the victim image reserved for them in order to act and be actors in their destiny. His field experience, knowledge and preachings are often cited as representative of a certain mutation of Islam specific to France.

=== Denial of the Armenian genocide ===
In a recording dated 5 October 2012, he declared: "If the law (penalising the denial of the Armenian genocide) had been passed, I would not have been able to say that the Armenian genocide does not exist, because the law would condemn me. Whereas there, I can have a great time. (...) There was no genocide and I have the historical proofs."

== See also ==
=== Bibliography ===
- Mejdoubi, Sara; El Asri, Farid (2023). "Sémantique du discours religieux sur l'altérité. Hassan Iquioussen comme étude de cas". Corpus (24). doi:10.4000/corpus.7838.
- Peter, Frank (2006). "Islamic sermons, religious authority and the individualization of Islam in France". Religiosité in der säkularisierten Welt. Theoretische und empirische Beiträge zur Säkularisierungsdebatte in der Religionssoziologie. VS Verlag für Sozialwissenschaften. pp. 303–319. doi:10.1007/978-3-531-90213-5_15. ISBN 978-3-8100-4039-8.

=== External links ===
- Official channel on YouTube.
