= Skoda =

Škoda means "pity" in the Czech and Slovak languages. It may also refer to:

== Czech brands and enterprises ==
- Škoda Auto, automobile and previously bicycle manufacturer in Mladá Boleslav
  - Škoda Motorsport, the division of Škoda Auto responsible for motorsport activities
- Škoda Transportation, engineering company that manufactures rail vehicles, based in Plzeň
- Škoda Works, engineering company, predecessor of Škoda Transportation
- Škoda-Kauba, aircraft manufacturing subsidiary of the Škoda Works in occupied Czechoslovakia in World War II
- Doosan Škoda Power, subsidiary of the Doosan Group, based in Plzeň

== People ==
- Škoda (surname)
- Skoda (Portuguese footballer) (born 1960)

== Art ==
- Škoda lásky, the original Czech title of the "Beer Barrel Polka"

== Other ==
- British Rail Class 90, an electric locomotive nicknamed Skoda
- Skoda (barquentine), sailing vessel built in Kingsport, Nova Scotia, in 1893
- Skoda Xanthi, former name of the Greek football club, Xanthi F.C. (sponsored by Škoda Auto in 1991–2016)
  - Skoda Xanthi Arena, former name of the club's stadium
- Skoda–El Mir theorem, theorem of complex geometry
