= Roland Delmaire =

French historian and academic (1941–2021)

- Born: 4 November 1941; Mametz, France
- Died: 12 April 2021 (aged 79)
- Occupations: Historian; Academic

Roland Delmaire (4 November 1941 – 12 April 2021) was a French historian and academic. He specialized in Gallo-Roman architecture and taught Roman history at Charles de Gaulle University – Lille III.

== Biography ==
Delmaire studied at Lille Catholic University from 1958 to 1961, where he graduated with a degree in history. He earned a master's degree in ancient history with a thesis titled L’Empire romain et la Perse au ive siècle. In 1963, he earned his certificate of aptitude for secondary school teachers and agrégation so that he could teach at the Lycée Faidherbe. He then travelled to Egypt to teach at Cairo University within a framework of cultural cooperation. In 1968, he defended a thesis titled Les responsables de l'administration financière au bas-empire under the supervision of André Chastagnol.

In 1970, Delmaire became an assistant professor at the University of Lille and held this job until 1973. He then joined the Faculty of History at Lille III and also served on the Conseil des Études et de la Vie Universitaire. He was a member of the Commission d’Histoire et d’Archéologie du Pas-de-Calais et de la Société Française de Numismatique. Additionally, he served on the editorial board of the newspaper Trésors Monétaires from 1994 to 2006. In 2006, he retired from teaching and became a professor emeritus.

Delmaire died on 12 April 2021 at the age of 79.

== Publications ==
- Les responsables des finances impériales au Bas-Empire romain (IVe-VIe s.). Études prosopographiques (1989)
- Largesses sacrées et res privata. L’aerarium impérial et son administration du IVe au VIe siècle (1989)
- Carte archéologique de la Gaule. 62-1. Le Pas-de-Calais (1994)
- Les institutions du Bas-Empire romain de Constantin à Justinien, I, Les institutions civiles palatines (1995)
- Carte archéologique de la Gaule. 62-2. Le Pas-de-Calais (1997)
- Carte archéologique de la Gaule. 59. Le Nord (1997)
- Carte archéologique de la Gaule. 59/2 (2012)

== Distinctions ==
- Third Prize for National Antiquities from the Académie des Inscriptions et Belles-Lettres (1995)
- Knight of the Ordre des Arts et des Lettres (1997)
- Prix Henry Debray of the Société des sciences et de l’Agriculture de Lille (1998)
