= Fine topology (potential theory) =

Topology in the study of subharmonic functions

In mathematics, in the field of potential theory, the fine topology is a natural topology for setting the study of subharmonic functions. In the earliest studies of subharmonic functions, namely those for which $\Delta u \ge 0,$ where $\Delta$ is the Laplacian, only smooth functions were considered. In that case it was natural to consider only the Euclidean topology, but with the advent of upper semi-continuous subharmonic functions introduced by F. Riesz, the fine topology became the more natural tool in many situations.

== Definition ==
The fine topology on the Euclidean space $\R^n$ is defined to be the coarsest topology making all subharmonic functions (equivalently all superharmonic functions) continuous. Concepts in the fine topology are normally prefixed with the word 'fine' to distinguish them from the corresponding concepts in the usual topology, as for example 'fine neighbourhood' or 'fine continuous'.

== Observations ==
The fine topology was introduced in 1940 by Henri Cartan to aid in the study of thin sets, subsets of n-dimensional complex space C^{n} with the property that each point has a neighbourhood on which some non-zero holomorphic function vanishes. Since the set on which a holomorphic function vanishes is closed and has empty interior (by the Identity theorem), a thin set is nowhere dense, and the closure of a thin set is also thin. It was initially considered to be somewhat pathological due to the absence of a number of properties such as local compactness which are so frequently useful in analysis. Subsequent work has shown that the lack of such properties is to a certain extent compensated for by the presence of other slightly less strong properties such as the quasi-Lindelöf property.

In one dimension, that is, on the real line, the fine topology coincides with the usual topology since in that case the subharmonic functions are precisely the convex functions which are already continuous in the usual (Euclidean) topology. Thus, the fine topology is of most interest in $\R^n$ where $n\geq 2$. The fine topology in this case is strictly finer than the usual topology, since there are discontinuous subharmonic functions.

Cartan observed in correspondence with Marcel Brelot that it is equally possible to develop the theory of the fine topology by using the concept of 'thinness'. In this development, a set $U$ is thin at a point $\zeta$ if there exists a subharmonic function $v$ defined on a neighbourhood of $\zeta$ such that

$$v(\zeta)>\limsup_{z\to\zeta, z\in U} v(z).$$

Then, a set $U$ is a fine neighbourhood of $\zeta$ if and only if the complement of $U$ is thin at $\zeta$.

== Properties of the fine topology ==
The fine topology is in some ways much less tractable than the usual topology in euclidean space, as is evidenced by the following (taking $n \ge 2$):

- A set $F$ in $\R^n$ is fine compact if and only if $F$ is finite.
- The fine topology on $\R^n$ is not locally compact (although it is Hausdorff).
- The fine topology on $\R^n$ is not first-countable, second-countable or metrisable.

The fine topology does at least have a few 'nicer' properties:

- The fine topology has the Baire property.
- The fine topology in $\R^n$ is locally connected.

The fine topology does not possess the Lindelöf property but it does have the slightly weaker quasi-Lindelöf property:

- An arbitrary union of fine open subsets of $\R^n$ differs by a polar set from some countable subunion.
