= Pluripolar set =

Analog of a polar set for plurisubharmonic functions

In mathematics, in the area of potential theory, a pluripolar set is the analog of a polar set for plurisubharmonic functions.

== Definition ==
Let $G \subset {\mathbb{C}}^n$ and let $f \colon G \to {\mathbb{R}} \cup \{ - \infty \}$ be a plurisubharmonic function which is not identically $-\infty$. The set

$${\mathcal{P}} := \{ z \in G \mid f(z) = - \infty \}$$

is called a complete pluripolar set. A pluripolar set is any subset of a complete pluripolar set. Pluripolar sets are of Hausdorff dimension at most $2n-2$ and have zero Lebesgue measure.

If $f$ is a holomorphic function then $\log | f |$ is a plurisubharmonic function. The zero set of $f$ is then a pluripolar set if $f$ is not the zero function.

== See also ==
- Skoda-El Mir theorem
