= Henda Ayari =

French ex-Salafi, feminist and secularist

- Born: 4 December 1976 (age 49); Rouen, France
- Occupations: Writer, feminist, secular activist
- Organization: Libératrices
- Known for: Women's rights activism, opposition to religious extremism
- Notable work: J'ai choisi d'être libre
- Children: 3

Henda Ayari (born 4 December 1976) is a French writer, feminist and secular activist.

Previously a Salafi Muslim, in 2015 she founded the association Libératrices, which helps defend women and prevent radicalisation.

== Biography ==
Henda Ayari was born on 4 December 1976 in Rouen to a father of Algerian origin and a mother of Tunisian origin, both non-practicing Muslims. Her mother was violent towards her, and her father abandoned the family.

After the divorce of her parents, at the age of 21 she decided to start wearing the veil, as is customary for many Muslim women, after marrying a Salafi man. One of the first things her husband, Bachir, did was to make her buy a jilbab, which covers from the head to toe, and a niqab, the face covering veil. The niqab was, in her words, maximum religiosity, the clothing that most pleases Allah. She adapted to family life and brought up her three children according to the rigorous principles of Salafi Islam. Henda Ayari lived for 9 years veiled from head to toe, under the absolute authority of her husband who grew more and more violent. She eventually rejected the Salafi way of life, obtained a divorce, and slowly regained her independence. For a while she worked at odd jobs before training to become a clerk at the Ministry of Justice and starting a confectionery business.

Inspired by the November 2015 Paris attacks, she created controversy on social media in December 2015 by posting on Facebook two photos, one of which was her dressed in the veil, the other without veil, in tailored clothing, which symbolised her emancipation. Her photo without the veil was flagged on Facebook for "nudity". She said she had nothing against women who wear the veil, but refused to accept those who impose the veil on others.

In 2016 she published her autobiography (J'ai choisi d'être libre). In October 2017 she accused Islamic studies academic Tariq Ramadan of raping her.
