= André Martineau =

French mathematician (1930–1972)

André Martineau (born 14 May 1930 – 4 May 1972) was a French mathematician, specializing in mathematical analysis.

Martineau studied at the École Normale Supérieure and received there, with Laurent Schwartz as supervisor, his Ph.D. with a thesis on analytic functionals and then worked for several years with Schwartz. Martineau became a professor at the University of Nice Sophia Antipolis. Shortly before his 42nd birthday, he died of cancer.

His research deals with analysis in several complex variables, where he introduced Fourier-Borel transformations for analytic functionals. (For one complex variable this type of functional transformation was introduced by Émile Borel.) Martineau was one of the early advocates of the theory of Sato's hyperfunctions and gave lectures on this topic in the Bourbaki Seminar during 1960–1961. According to Pierre Cartier, Martineau played a role in the development of the concept of schemes in algebraic geometry by means of a remark made to Jean-Pierre Serre.

Consider a quotation from the year 2004:

A set in complex Euclidean space is called C-convex if all its intersections with complex lines are contractible, and it is said to be linearly convex if its complement is a union of complex hyperplanes. These notions are intermediate between ordinary geometric convexity and pseudoconvexity. Their importance was first manifested in the pioneering work of André Martineau from about forty years ago. Since then a large number of new results have been obtained by many different mathematicians.

Martineau was an Invited Speaker at the International Congress of Mathematicians in 1962 in Stockholm with talk Croissance d'une fonction entiers de type exponentiel et supports des fonctionelles analytiques and in 1970 in Nice with talk Fonctionelles analytiques. His doctoral students include Henri Skoda.

His son Jacques Martineau (born 1963) is a movie director and screenwriter.

== Selected publications ==
- Oeuvre, Editions du CNRS 1977, 878 pages
- Martineau, A. (1966). "Sur la topologie des espaces de fonctions holomorphes". Mathematische Annalen. 163: 62–88. doi:10.1007/BF02052485.

== See also ==
- Martineau's edge-of-the-wedge theorem
