= XPaint =

X/11 based graphics program

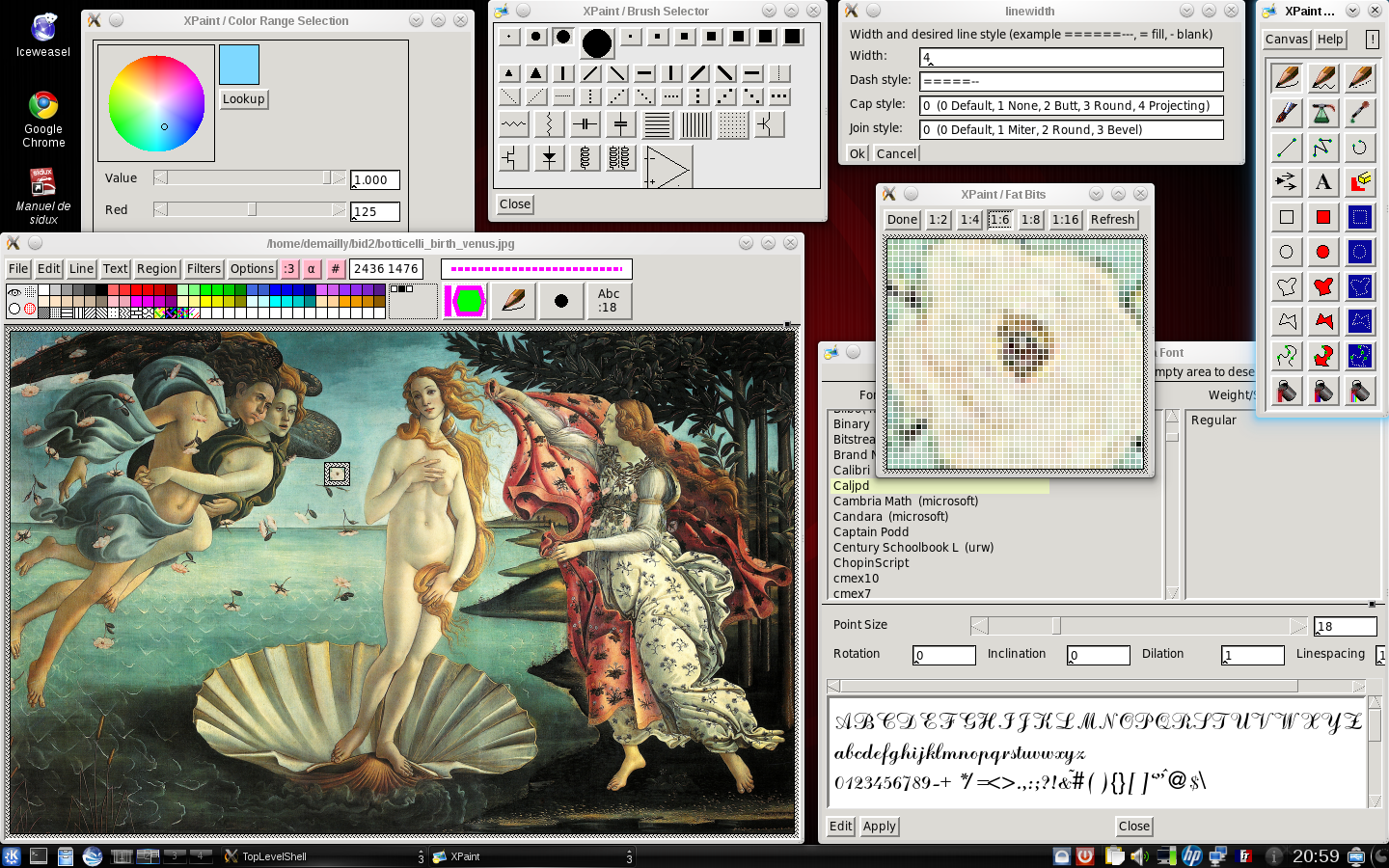
- Initial release: 1993; 32 years ago
- Stable release: 3.1.4 / 14 August 2021
- Repository: https://sourceforge.net/p/sf-xpaint/code/?source=navbar
- Written in: C
- Type: Raster graphics editor
- License: GNU GPL v3
- Website: http://sf-xpaint.sf.net

XPaint (also spelled Xpaint) is a free and open-source raster graphics editor for Unix-like operating systems.

XPaint was originally developed by David Koblas around 1993 and maintained by him until version 2.1.1, after which it was further developed by Torsten Martinsen from 1996 to 1999. Since around 2000, XPaint has been maintained and developed by a French mathematician, Jean-Pierre Demailly. Its main purpose is to be a lightweight and easy-to-use raster editor. It supports various image file formats, including GIF, PNG, JPEG, TIFF, PPM, XBM, and XPM.

== See also ==
- Microsoft Paint
- Paint.NET
- GIMP
