= Škoda (surname) =

Škoda (feminine: Škodová) is a Czech surname. The Czech word škoda means 'damage', 'harm', and the surname originated as a name for someone who suffered bodily harm or property damage. The surname was first documented in 1433. Notable people with the surname include:

- Blanka Škodová (born 1997), Czech ice hockey player
- Emil von Škoda (1839–1900), Czech engineer and industrialist
- Hannah Skoda (born 1981), British historian
- Henri Skoda (born 1945), French mathematician
- Jarmila Škodová (born 1943), Czech cross-country skier
- Joseph Škoda (1805–1881), Czech medical doctor
- Leoš Škoda (born 1953), Czech ski jumper
- Michal Škoda (born 1988), Czech footballer
- Milan Škoda (born 1986), Czech footballer
- Rudolf Skoda (1931–2015), German architect

== See also ==
- Paul Badura-Skoda (1927–2019), Austrian pianist
- Eva Badura-Skoda (1929–2021), Austrian musicologist
