= Jean-Pierre Demailly =

French mathematician (1957–2022)

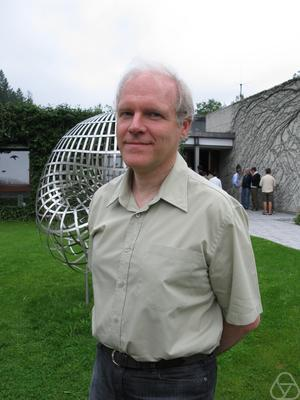
- Demailly in 2008
- Born: 25 September 1957; Péronne, France
- Died: 17 March 2022 (aged 64); France
- Education: École Normale Supérieure; Paris Diderot University; Pierre and Marie Curie University
- Awards: List of Awards: CNRS Bronze Medal (1981); Prix Mergier-Bourdeix (1994); Humboldt Prize (1996); Simion Stoilow Prize (2006); Permanent member of the French Academy of Sciences (2007); Stefan Bergman Prize (2015); Heinz Hopf Prize (2021)
- Scientific career
- Fields: Mathematics
- Workplaces: Université Grenoble Alpes
- Thesis: Sur différents aspects de la positivité en analyse complexe (1982)
- Doctoral advisor: Henri Skoda

Jean-Pierre Demailly (25 September 1957 – 17 March 2022) was a French mathematician who worked in complex geometry. He was a professor at Université Grenoble Alpes and a permanent member of the French Academy of Sciences.

== Early life and education ==
Demailly was born on 25 September 1957 in Péronne, France. He attended the Lycée de Péronne from 1966 to 1973 and the Lycée Faidherbe from 1973 to 1975. He entered the École Normale Supérieure in 1975, where he received his agrégation in 1977 and graduated in 1979. During this time, he received an undergraduate licence degree from Paris Diderot University in 1976 and a diplôme d'études approfondies under Henri Skoda at the Pierre and Marie Curie University in 1979. He received his Doctorat d'État in 1982 under the direction of Skoda at the Pierre and Marie Curie University, with thesis "Sur différents aspects de la positivité en analyse complexe".

== Career ==
Demailly became a professor at Université Grenoble Alpes in 1983. He served as the editor-in-chief of the Annales de l'Institut Fourier from 1998 to 2006 and the editor-in-chief of Comptes Rendus Mathématique from 2010 to 2015. He was also an editor for Inventiones Mathematicae from 1997 to 2002.

He was the director of the Institut Fourier from 2003 to 2006. From June 2003 onwards, he led the Groupe de réflexion interdisciplinaire sur les programmes (GRIP), which ran experimental classes in primary schools.

== Research ==
Demailly's mathematical works primarily concerned complex analytic geometry, using techniques from complex geometry with applications to algebraic geometry and number theory. He also wrote and co-authored several Unix and Linux programs and libraries starting in the 1990s, including XPaint, sunclock, and dmg2img.

=== Kählerian geometry ===
One main topic of Demailly's research is Pierre Lelong's generalization of the notion of a Kähler form to allow forms with singularities, known as currents. In particular, for a compact complex manifold $X$, an element of the Dolbeault cohomology group $H^{1,1}(X,\R)$ is called pseudo-effective if it is represented by a closed positive (1,1)-current (where "positive" means "nonnegative" in this phrase), or big if it is represented by a strictly positive (1,1)-current; these definitions generalize the corresponding notions for holomorphic line bundles on projective varieties. Demailly's regularization theorem says, in particular, that any big class can be represented by a Kähler current with analytic singularities.

Such analytic results have had many applications to algebraic geometry. In particular, Boucksom, Demailly, Păun, and Peternell showed that a smooth complex projective variety $X$ is uniruled if and only if its canonical bundle $K_X$ is not pseudo-effective.

=== Multiplier ideals ===
For a singular metric on a line bundle, Nadel, Demailly, and Yum-Tong Siu developed the concept of the multiplier ideal, which describes where the metric is most singular. There is an analog of the Kodaira vanishing theorem for such a metric, on compact or noncompact complex manifolds. This led to the first effective criteria for a line bundle on a complex projective variety $X$ of any dimension $n$ to be very ample, that is, to have enough global sections to give an embedding of $X$ into projective space. For example, Demailly showed in 1993 that $2K_X+ 12n^nL$ is very ample for any ample line bundle L, where addition denotes the tensor product of line bundles. The method has inspired later improvements in the direction of the Fujita conjecture.

=== Kobayashi hyperbolicity ===
Demailly used the technique of jet differentials introduced by Green and Phillip Griffiths to prove Kobayashi hyperbolicity for various projective varieties. For example, Demailly and El Goul showed that a very general complex surface $X$ of degree at least 21 in projective space $\mathbb{CP}^3$ is hyperbolic; equivalently, every holomorphic map $\Complex \to X$ is constant. For any variety $X$ of general type, Demailly showed that every holomorphic map $\Complex \to X$ satisfies some (in fact, many) algebraic differential equations.

== Awards and honors ==
Demailly received the CNRS Bronze Medal in 1981, the Prix Mergier-Bourdeix from the French Academy of Sciences in 1994, the Humboldt Prize in 1996, the Simion Stoilow Prize from the Romanian Academy of Sciences in 2006, the Stefan Bergman Prize from the American Mathematical Society in 2015, and the Heinz Hopf Prize from ETH in 2021.

Demailly was elected a correspondent of the French Academy of Sciences in 1994 and then became a permanent member in 2007. He was an invited speaker at the International Congress of Mathematicians in 1994 and a plenary speaker in 2006.

In 2024, the Jean-Pierre Demailly prize for open science in mathematics is created in his honor. It is awarded every two years.

In 2025, the Société mathématique de France published a special issue of its gazette in his memory.

== Death ==
Demailly died on 17 March 2022.
