= Pierre Dolbeault =

French mathematician (1924–2015)

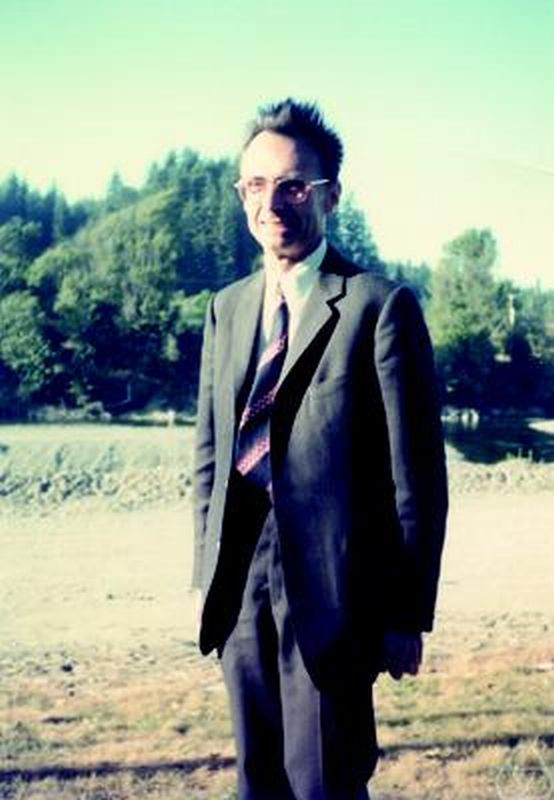
- Pierre Dolbeault c. 1974
- Born: 10 October 1924; France
- Died: 12 June 2015 (aged 90); Paris, France
- Education: École normale supérieure University of Paris
- Scientific career
- Fields: Mathematics
- Doctoral advisor: Henri Cartan

Pierre Dolbeault (October 10, 1924 – June 12, 2015) was a French mathematician.

Dolbeault studied with Henri Cartan and graduated in 1944 from the École Normale Supérieure. He completed his Ph.D. at the University of Paris in 1955 under the supervision of Cartan, with a dissertation titled Formes différentielles et cohomologie sur une variété analytique complexe.

He taught in the 1950s at the University of Montpellier and the University of Bordeaux, and later at the Pierre and Marie Curie University (Jussieu). Together with Pierre Lelong and Henri Skoda he held an Analysis seminar in Paris.

Dolbeault cohomology is named after him, and so is the Dolbeault theorem.
