= Gamal al-Banna =

Egyptian writer and trade unionist (1920–2013)

Gamal al-Banna (also: Jamal al-Banna, Arabic: جمال البنا; 15 December 1920 – 30 January 2013) was an Egyptian author, and trade unionist. He was the youngest brother of Hassan al-Banna (1906–49), founder of the Muslim Brotherhood. Al-Banna was considered a liberal scholar, known for his criticism of Islamic traditional narratives. He rejected 635 Hadiths of Sahih Bukhari and Sahih Muslim which he found contradictory to the Qur'an. He was a great-uncle of the Swiss Muslim academic and writer Tariq Ramadan.

== Early life ==
Born in 1920 into a pious family in Mahmudiya, Gamal was the youngest brother of Hassan al-Banna, the founder of the Muslim Brotherhood. His father mended watches for a living but spent much time collecting and classifying hadiths. As a child he was weak and sickly, so he spent his time reading with his father. After completing secondary school, he refused to go to university but decided instead to start a writing career.

== Thinking ==
Gamal al-Banna represented an interpretation of Islam which is rationalist, humanist, egalitarian, feminist, anti-authoritarian, liberal, and secular. As a political thinker and social reformer, he adopted an anti-capitalist position. In the preface to Al-Barnamadj al-Islami ("The Islamic Program"), when the end of the Cold War became apparent in 1991, he wrote the following ("A Disrupted World", pp. 6–8):

The collapse of Marxism doesn't mean that capitalism will succeed. Rather, this means that the mistakes of Marxism were bigger than the mistakes of capitalism. [...] Most people forget that Islam occurred at a time when the world was divided into two huge states forcing upon it humiliating subjection, class rule, and the government of tyrants. Both deprived the masses of the most fundamental principles of justice and left them in poverty and ignorance, burdened with the back-breaking load of forced labor which leaves them neither time nor health, nor opportunities to think. Both enthroned Caesars and Chosroes as gods exerting authority over life and death. Then Islam came and destroyed these systems: it replaced the class system with its elitist barriers and dead ends by the general equality of the people, the highest ranks or the strata of notables by the declaration of absolute equality among the people, without any difference between black and white, male and female, rich and poor, base and noble. [...] It was not the prayer or the fast that constituted the new gift, for the cultic commandments are represented in all religions. Rather, what was new was the spirit of freedom, the principles of justice and equality that Islam let shine. Today Islam is called upon to fulfill this role a second time.

== Humanism and social justice ==
Al-Banna was committed to the labor and trade-unionist movement for decades. He was a labor union official in the textile industry. In 1953, he founded The Egyptian Society for the Care of Prisoners and their Families. Al-Banna taught at the Cairo Institute of Trade-Union Studies for 30 years (1963–93). In 1981, he founded the International Islamic Confederation of Labor in Geneva, Switzerland and became its first president.

According to al-Banna, Islam is anti-capitalist. He was opposed to severe punishment, e.g. the death penalty for apostasy, as well as in his opposition to the discrimination against women or religious minorities such as the Coptic Christians in Egypt.

== Egalitarianism and feminism ==
Gamal al-Banna was a strict egalitarian. In his view, Islam gives women and men the same rights and duties, and a good Muslim regards all human beings as equal, no matter what their religion is. As for the role of women in Islam, al-Banna saw no reason why a Muslim woman could not fill the role of imam (female: imama, i.e. leader) in prayer (salat).

He devoted his book The Muslim Woman to this theme.

== Liberalism ==
For al-Banna, religious thinking may not be restricted in any way. Al-Banna's freedom of belief includes a Muslim's conversion which does not permit anyone to harm him or her.

== Secularism ==
Al-Banna was a religious Muslim who supported the notion of an "Islamic state", for the power of the state is often misused by politicians for political ends, whereby both Muslims and Islam are harmed. He championed the protection of state and religion, to protect Muslims and Islam from the political establishment's misuse of politics.

== Media ==
Al-Banna frequently appeared on Egyptian and other Arab TV programs where he answered questions and took part in discussions (see "Videos" below), which sometimes proved awkward for the television networks. For instance, during Ramadan of 2006, he said smoking was not forbidden and that Muslims were free to smoke in the daytime during Ramadan. He justified this by the fact that there was no tobacco in the prophetic era (7th century AD) and that neither the Quran nor Messenger Muhammad prohibited smoking explicitly.

== Other books by Gamal al-Banna not referenced above ==
He was the author of "over fifty books". His publications include:

- Tathwir al-Qur'an ("The Revolutionization of the Quran"). Cairo: Dar al-Fikr al-Islami, 2000.
- Tafnid Da'wa Hadd ar-Eidda ("Refutation of the Demand of the Punishment for Apostas"). Cairo: Dar ash-Shuruq, 2008.
- Al-Hejab ("The Headscarf"). Cairo: Dar al-Fikr al-Islami, 2002.

== See also ==
- Islamic Modernism
