= Polar set (potential theory) =

In mathematics, in the area of classical potential theory, polar sets are the "negligible sets", similar to the way in which sets of measure zero are the negligible sets in measure theory.

== Definition ==
A set $Z$ in $\R^n$ (where $n\ge 2$) is a polar set if there is a non-constant subharmonic function

$u$ on $\R^n$

such that

$$Z \subseteq \{x \in \R^n: u(x) = -\infty\}.$$

Note that there are other (equivalent) ways in which polar sets may be defined, such as by replacing "subharmonic" by "superharmonic", and $-\infty$ by $\infty$ in the definition above.

== Properties ==
The most important properties of polar sets are:

- A singleton set in $\R^n$ is polar.
- A countable set in $\R^n$ is polar.
- The union of a countable collection of polar sets is polar.
- A polar set has Lebesgue measure zero in $\R^n.$

== Nearly everywhere ==
A property holds nearly everywhere in a set S if it holds on S−E where E is a Borel polar set. If P holds nearly everywhere then it holds almost everywhere.

== See also ==
- Pluripolar set
