= Tariq Ramadan =

Swiss scholar (born 1962)

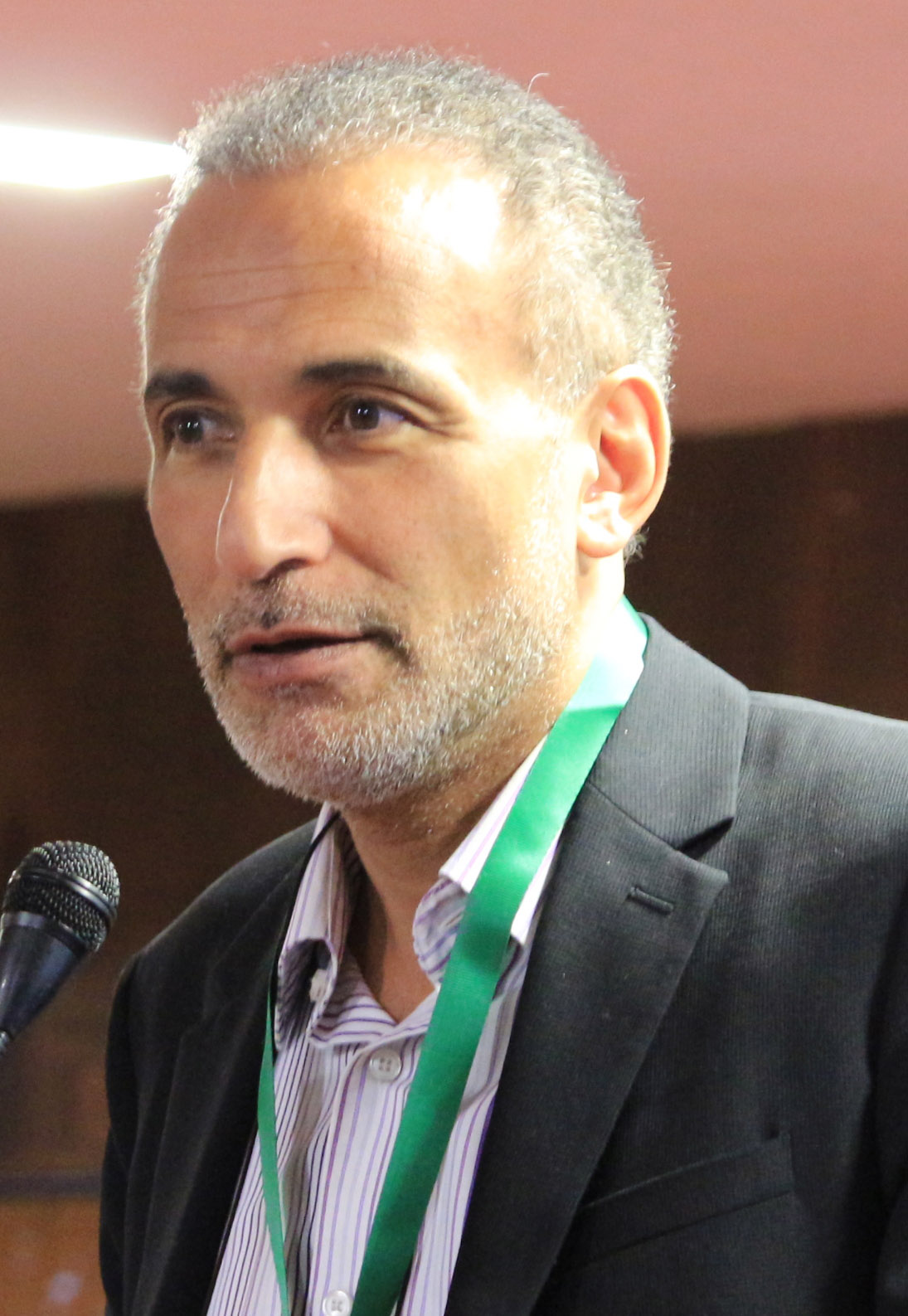
- Ramadan in 2017
- Born: 26 August 1962 (age 64); Geneva, Switzerland

Education
- Education: University of Geneva (PhD)

Philosophical work
- Institutions: Collège de Saussure; St Antony's College, Oxford
- Main interests: Islamic studies Theology philosophy Politics; Interfaith dialogue Literature; Reform
- Website: tariqramadan.org

Tariq Ramadan (Arabic: طارق رمضان [tˤaːriq ramadˤaːn]; born 26 August 1962) is a Swiss philosopher, writer, and Islamic scholar who was convicted of three counts of rape by a French court in 2026. He has held academic positions including professor of contemporary Islamic studies at St Antony's College, Oxford and the Faculty of Theology and Religion, University of Oxford. He was a visiting professor at the Faculty of Islamic Studies at Hamad Bin Khalifa University in Qatar, and a former director of the Research Centre of Islamic Legislation and Ethics (CILE) in Doha.

Ramadan is the grandson of Hassan al-Banna, the founder of the Muslim Brotherhood, and has written and lectured on Islam, Muslim identity in Europe and reformist thought. He has described himself as a "Salafi reformist".

Ramadan has been convicted of rape and sexual coercion in Switzerland, and of rape and rape of a vulnerable person in France. In 2024, a Swiss appeals court convicted him in relation to a 2008 incident in Geneva, which became final in 2025 after his appeal was rejected by the Federal Supreme Court of Switzerland. In March 2026, the Paris criminal court convicted him of raping three women and sentenced him to 18 years’ imprisonment; the judgment is subject to appeal.

== Life and career ==
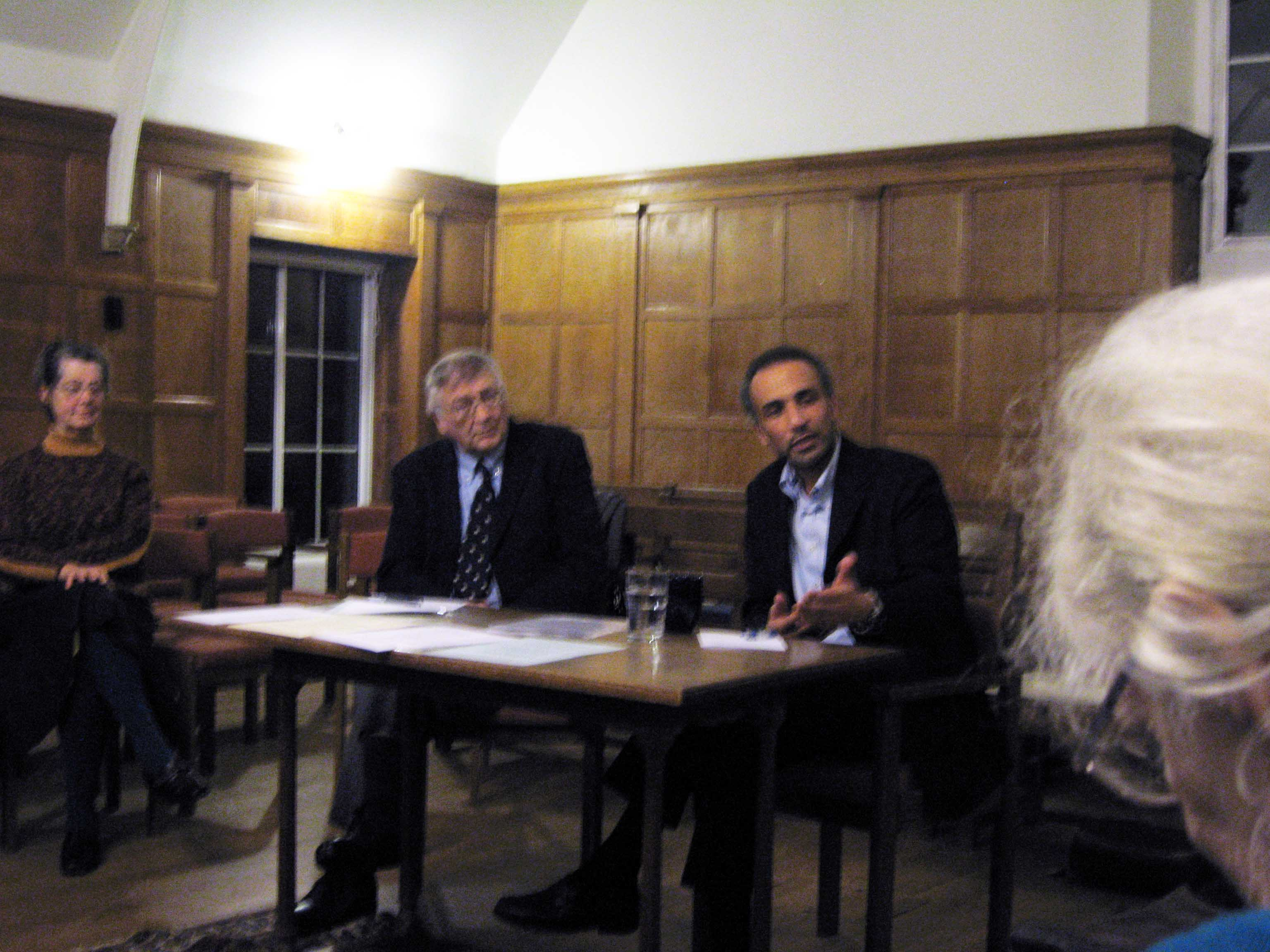
Tariq Ramadan (at table, right) speaking in Oxford.

Tariq Ramadan was born in Geneva, Switzerland on 26 August 1962 to an Egyptian Muslim family. He is the son of Said Ramadan and Wafa al-Banna, who was the eldest daughter of Hassan al Banna, who in 1928 founded the Muslim Brotherhood in Egypt. Gamal al-Banna, the liberal Muslim reformer, was his great-uncle. His father was a prominent figure in the Muslim Brotherhood and was exiled by Gamal Abdel Nasser from Egypt to Switzerland, where Ramadan was born.

Tariq Ramadan holds an M.A. in French literature and a PhD in Arabic and Islamic studies at the University of Geneva. He also wrote a PhD dissertation on Friedrich Nietzsche, titled Nietzsche as a Historian of Philosophy.

In 1994, he addressed a French-speaking public audience, in Switzerland, with the help of Hassan Iquioussen and Malika Dif.

He taught at the Collège de Saussure, a high school in Lancy, Switzerland, and claims to have held a lectureship in Religion and Philosophy at the University of Fribourg from 1996 to 2003, something the university publicly denied in 2018. He was appointed a professor at the University of Notre Dame in the United States in 2004 before his visa had been revoked by the Bush administration because of the Patriot Act. In October 2005 he began teaching at St Antony's College, Oxford, on a visiting fellowship. In 2005 he was a senior research fellow at the Lokahi Foundation.

In 2007 he successfully applied for the professorship in Islamic studies at the University of Leiden. This led to severe criticism from both academics as well as politicians who deemed Ramadan a 'radical Islamist' and a 'wolf in sheep's clothing'. Ramadan later turned down the appointment, stating that the criticism on his appointment played no role in this decision. He was also a guest professor of Identity and Citizenship at Erasmus University Rotterdam, until August 2009 when both the City of Rotterdam and Erasmus University dismissed him from his positions as "integration adviser" and professor, stating that the program he hosted on Iran's Press TV, Islam & Life, was "irreconcilable" with his duties in Rotterdam. Ramadan described this move as 'Islamophobic' and 'politically charged'. In 2012 the Court of Rotterdam District ruled in a civil law case that the Erasmus University acted "carelessly" by dismissing Ramadan at short notice. The dismissal by the municipality of Rotterdam, however, was not careless according to the Court.

Beginning September 2009, Ramadan was appointed to the chair in Contemporary Islamic Studies at Oxford University.

Ramadan established the Mouvement des Musulmans Suisses (Movement of Swiss Muslims), which engages in various interfaith seminars. He is an advisor to the EU on religious issues and was sought for advice by the EU on a commission on "Islam and Secularism". In September 2005 he was invited to join a task force by the government of the United Kingdom. He is also the founder and President of the European Muslim Network, a Brussels-based think-tank that gathers European Muslim intellectuals and activists.

As of 2009, Tariq Ramadan was persona non grata in Tunisia, Egypt, Saudi Arabia, Libya, and Syria, which he has said is because of his criticism of their "undemocratic regimes". He is also considered persona non grata in Israel.

=== Family life ===
Tariq Ramadan married in 1986 and is the father of four children. His wife was born in Bretagne, France. She converted from Catholicism to Islam and adopted the name Iman. The couple live separately.

== U.S. visa revocation and subsequent lifting ==
In February 2004, Tariq Ramadan accepted the tenured position of Henry R. Luce Professor of Religion, Conflict and Peacebuilding at the Joan B. Kroc Institute for International Peace Studies, at the University of Notre Dame. He was granted a nonimmigrant visa on 5 May; however, on 28 July, his H-1B visa was revoked by the State Department. In August 2004, spokesman for U.S. Immigration and Customs Enforcement cited the "ideological exclusion provision" of the U.S. Patriot Act as the grounds for Ramadan's visa revocation. In October, the University of Notre Dame filed an H-1B petition on Ramadan's behalf. After hearing no response from the government by December, Ramadan resigned his position from the university.

In September 2005, Ramadan filed an application for a B Visa to allow him to participate at speaking arrangements with various organizations and universities. The government did not issue a decision on Ramadan's visa application, so the American Civil Liberties Union and the New York Civil Liberties Union filed a lawsuit on 25 January 2006 against the United States government on behalf of the American Academy of Religion, the American Association of University Professors and the PEN American Center – three groups who had planned on meeting with Ramadan in the US – for revoking Ramadan's visa under the "ideological exclusion provision". The ACLU and NYCLU argued that the ideological exclusion provision was in violation of the First Amendment and Fifth Amendment rights of those three groups and that the government's actions violated the Administrative Procedures Act. After two months had passed without a decision being made, the plaintiffs filed a motion for a preliminary injunction. Pursuant to the injunction, the United States District Court for the Southern District of New York ordered the government on 23 June 2006 to issue its decision on Ramadan's pending B Visa application within 90 days.

On 19 September 2006, the government formally denied Ramadan's visa application. A State Department statement said: "A U.S. consular officer has denied Dr. Tariq Ramadan's visa application. The consular officer concluded that Dr. Ramadan was inadmissible based solely on his actions, which constituted providing material support to a terrorist organization." Between December 1998 and July 2002, Ramadan had given donations totalling $940 to two charity organizations, the Committee for Charity and Support for the Palestinians (CBSP) or Comité de Bienfaisance et de Secours aux Palestiniens and the Association de Secours Palestinien. The United States Treasury designated both the CBSP and ASP terrorist fundraising organizations for their alleged links to Hamas on 22 August 2003. The U.S. Embassy told Ramadan that he "reasonably should have known" that the charities provided money to Hamas. In an article in The Washington Post, Ramadan asked: "How should I reasonably have known of their activities before the U.S. government itself knew?"

On 2 February 2007, the ACLU and NYCLU amended their complaint, arguing that the government's explanation for denying Ramadan's visa application was not "facially legitimate and bona fide" and that the ideological exclusion provision of the PATRIOT Act was in violation of the First and Fifth Amendments. They also argued that Ramadan's denial violated the First Amendment rights of those who wanted to hear him speak. In his decision on 20 December 2007, District Judge Paul A. Crotty ruled that the government's justification for denying Ramadan's visa was "facially legitimate and bona fide" and noted that the Court "has no authority to override the Government's consular decision".

In January 2008, the ACLU appealed Crotty's ruling. Jameel Jaffer, Director of the ACLU National Security Project and lead attorney in the case, stated:

"The government's shifting positions only underscore why meaningful judicial review – the kind of oversight that the district court failed to provide – is so important. In Professor Ramadan's case and many others, the government is using immigration laws to stigmatize and exclude its critics and to censor and control the ideas that Americans can hear. Censorship of this kind is completely inconsistent with the most basic principles of an open society."

Ramadan himself remarked:

"The U.S. government's actions in my case seem, at least to me, to have been arbitrary and myopic. But I am encouraged by the unwavering support I have received from ordinary Americans, civic groups and particularly from scholars, academic organizations, and the ACLU. I am heartened by the emerging debate in the U.S. about what has been happening to our countries and ideals in the past six years. And I am hopeful that eventually I will be allowed to enter the country so that I may contribute to the debate and be enriched by dialogue."

On 17 July 2009, the US federal appeals court reversed the ruling of the lower district court. The three-judge panel on the United States Court of Appeals for the Second Circuit – composed of Judges Jon O. Newman, Wilfred Feinberg and Reena Raggi – ruled that the Court had "jurisdiction to consider the claim, despite the doctrine of consular nonreviewability". They stated that government was required by law to "confront Ramadan with the allegation against him and afford him the subsequent opportunity to demonstrate by clear and convincing evidence that he did not know, and reasonably should not have known, that the recipient of his contributions was a terrorist organization." Under the limited review permitted by the 1972 Supreme Court ruling in Kleindienst v. Mandel, the panel concluded that the "record does not establish that the consular officer who denied the visa confronted Ramadan with the allegation that he had knowingly rendered material support to a terrorist organization, thereby precluding an adequate opportunity for Ramadan to attempt to satisfy the provision that exempts a visa applicant from exclusion under the 'material support' subsection if he 'can demonstrate by clear and convincing evidence that [he] did not know, and should not reasonably have known, that the organization was a terrorist organization.'" Additionally, the panel agreed with the plaintiffs' contention that their First Amendment rights had been violated. The panel remanded the case to a lower court to determine if the consular officer had confronted Ramadan with the "allegation that he knew that ASP provided funds to Hamas and then providing him with a reasonable opportunity to demonstrate, by clear and convincing evidence, that he did not know, and should not have reasonably known, of that fact."

Following the ruling, Ramadan stated, "I am very gratified with the court's decision. I am eager to engage once again with Americans in the kinds of face-to-face discussions that are central to academic exchange and crucial to bridging cultural divides." Melissa Goodman, staff attorney with the ACLU National Security Project, issued a statement saying, "Given today's decision, we hope that the Obama administration will immediately end Professor Ramadan's exclusion. We also encourage the new administration to reconsider the exclusion of other foreign scholars, writers and artists who were barred from the country by the Bush administration on ideological grounds."

On 8 April 2010, Ramadan spoke as part of a panel discussion at the Great Hall of Cooper Union in New York City, his first public appearance since the State Department lifted the ban. Julia Kraut wrote that his discretionary exclusion, and its later rescission by a different presidential administration, "served as a reminder of the importance of discretion and of who holds that discretion to determine the fate of foreigners seeking to enter the United States, as well as the potential for abuse of discretion under the law."

== Views ==
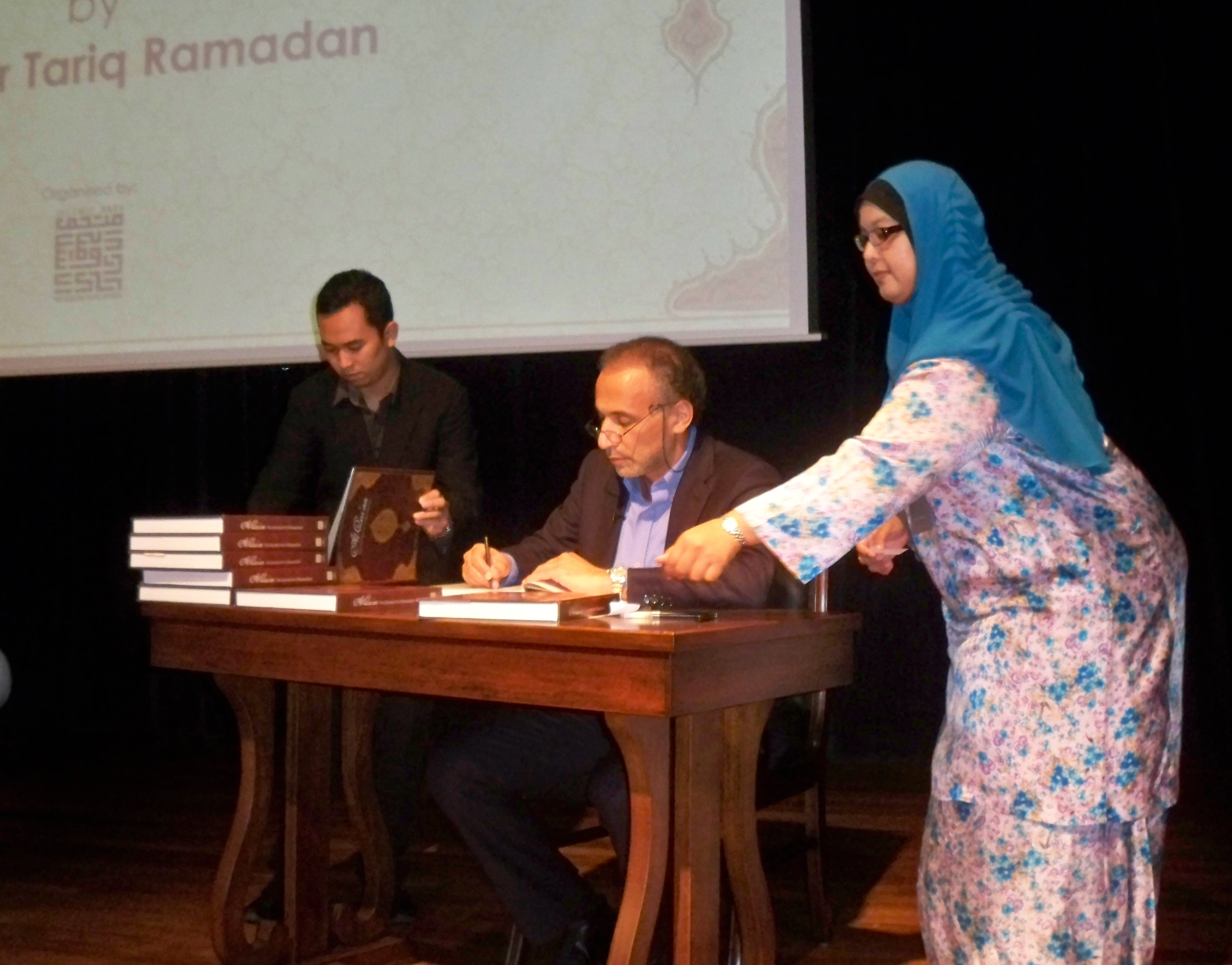
Tariq Ramadan signing books. Muslim Arts Museum, Kuala Lumpur, Malaysia, 31 January 2015

Ramadan works primarily on Islamic theology and the position of Muslims in the West and within Muslim majority countries. Generally speaking, he prioritizes Qur'anic interpretation over simply reading the text, in order to understand its meaning and to practice the tenets of Islamic philosophy. Referring to himself, Ramadan has at times used the construction "Salafi Reformist" to illustrate his stance.

He rejects a binary division of the world into dar al-Islam (the abode of Islam) and dar al-harb (the abode of war), on the grounds that such a division is not mentioned in the Qur'an. He has been also known to favourably cite dar al-da‘wah (the abode of preaching).

For him the "Islamic message" to which Muslims are expected to bear witness is not primarily the particularist, socially conservative code of traditionalist jurists, but a commitment to universalism and the welfare of non-Muslims; it is also an injunction not merely to make demands on un-Islamic societies but to express solidarity with them.

Ramadan has voiced his opposition to all forms of capital punishment but believes the Muslim world should remove such laws from within, without any Western pressure, as such would only further alienate Muslims, and instead bolster the position of those who support hudud punishments: "Muslim populations are convincing themselves of the Islamic character of these practices through a rejection of the west, on the basis of a simplistic reasoning that stipulates that 'the less western, the more Islamic'".

He has condemned suicide bombing and violence as a tactic. Additionally, he contends that terrorism is never justifiable, even though it can be understandable (in the sense of having a legitimate cause of resistance behind it).

Ramadan wrote that the Muslim response to Pope Benedict XVI's speech on Islam was disproportionate, and was encouraged by reactionary Islamic regimes in order to distract their populations, and that it did not improve the position of Islam in the world.

Ramadan wrote an article, "Critique des (nouveaux) intellectuels communautaires", which French newspapers Le Monde and Le Figaro refused to publish. Oumma.com did eventually publish it. In the article he criticizes a number of French intellectuals and figures such as Alexandre Adler, Alain Finkielkraut, Bernard-Henri Lévy, André Glucksmann and Bernard Kouchner, for allegedly abandoning universal human rights, and giving special status to the defence of Israel. Ramadan was accused, in return, of having used inflammatory language. The underlying content of the essay was sharply criticized as well.

=== Debate ===
In a French television debate in 2003 with Nicolas Sarkozy, Sarkozy accused Ramadan of defending the stoning of adulterers, a punishment supposedly warranted by a section of the Islamic penal code known as hudud. Ramadan replied that Sarkozy was wrong. He said that he opposed corporal punishments, stoning and the death penalty and that he is in favor of a moratorium on these practices to open the debate among Islamic scholars in Muslim-majority countries that enforce them. Many people, including Sarkozy, were outraged. Ramadan later defended his position arguing that, because it involved religious texts that Muslims take seriously, the law would have to be properly understood and contextualized. Ramadan argued that in Muslim countries, the simple act to "condemn" will not change anything, but with a moratorium, it could open the way for further debate. He thinks that such a debate can only lead to an abolition of these rules.

In October 2007, Douglas Murray, David Aaronovitch and Ibn Warraq participated in an Intelligence Squared debate "We Should Not Be Reluctant to Assert the Superiority of Western Values," where Ramadan, William Dalrymple and Charles Glass argued for the opposition viewpoint.

In October 2010, he debated with Christopher Hitchens as to whether Islam was a religion of peace.

=== Mauritania ban ===
On 16 July 2016, Ramadan was denied entry to Mauritania at Nouakchott International Airport. He had been invited to give lectures in the country. He claimed the decision "came directly from the presidency". Local police confirmed he "was expelled". This is the eighth time a Muslim country has denied him entry.

== Critical reception ==
Some academics have detected liberalising and rationalising tendencies.

=== Praise ===
Paul Donnelly in 2001 asked rhetorically: "Tariq Ramadan: The Muslim Martin Luther?" Similarly, an article at the self-described liberal The American Prospect praised Ramadan and his work in particular as an "entire corpus consists of a steady and unyielding assault on Muslim insularity, self-righteousness, and self-pity."

=== Criticism ===
In her book, Frère Tariq, (Encounter Books), Caroline Fourest claimed to have analysed Tariq Ramadan's 15 books, 1,500 pages of interviews, and approximately 100 recordings, and concludes "Ramadan is a war leader", an "Islamist" and the "political heir of his grandfather", Hassan al-Banna, stating that his discourse is "often just a repetition of the discourse that Banna had at the beginning of the 20th century in Egypt", and that he "presents [al-Banna] as a model to be followed." She argues that "Tariq Ramadan is slippery. He says one thing to his faithful Muslim followers and something else entirely to his Western audience. His choice of words, the formulations he uses – even his tone of voice – vary, chameleon-like, according to his audience."

The former head of the French antiracism organization SOS Racisme, Malek Boutih, has been quoted as saying to Ramadan, after talking with him at length: "Mr. Ramadan, you are a fascist". In an interview with Europe 1, Malek Boutih also likened Ramadan to "a small Le Pen"; in another interview he accused him of having crossed the line of racism and antisemitism, thus not genuinely belonging to the alter-globalization movement. Bertrand Delanoë, mayor of Paris, declared Ramadan unfit to participate at the European Social Forum, as not even "a slight suspicion of anti-Semitism" would be tolerable. Talking to the Paris weekly Marianne, Fadela Amara, president of Ni Putes Ni Soumises (Neither Whores Nor Submissive, a French feminist movement), Aurélie Filippetti, municipal counsellor for The Greens in Paris, Patrick Klugman, leading member of the Conseil Représentatif des Institutions juives de France, and Dominique Sopo, head of SOS Racisme, accuse Ramadan of having misused the alter-globalization movement's ingenuousness to advance his "radicalism and anti-Semitism." Other criticisms have included allegations that an essay attacking French intellectuals was antisemitic and that Ramadan has shown excessive generosity in his rationalization of the motives behind acts of terrorism, such as in the case of Mohammed Merah.

Olivier Guitta, writing in The Weekly Standard, welcomed the U.S. decision to refuse Ramadan a visa, based on Ramadan's supposed links to terrorist organizations, and claiming that his father was the likely author of "'The Project'... a roadmap for installing Islamic regimes in the West by propaganda, preaching, and if necessary war." Guitta also criticized Ramadan for his campaign against the performance of Voltaire's play Mahomet in Geneva. After the lifting of the visa revocation, an article in the National Review criticized the double standard of lifting the visa restriction on Ramadan, but not for Issam Abu Issa who was banned by the Bush administration for being a whistleblower against the Palestinian Authority's corruption.

==== Response to some of the criticism ====
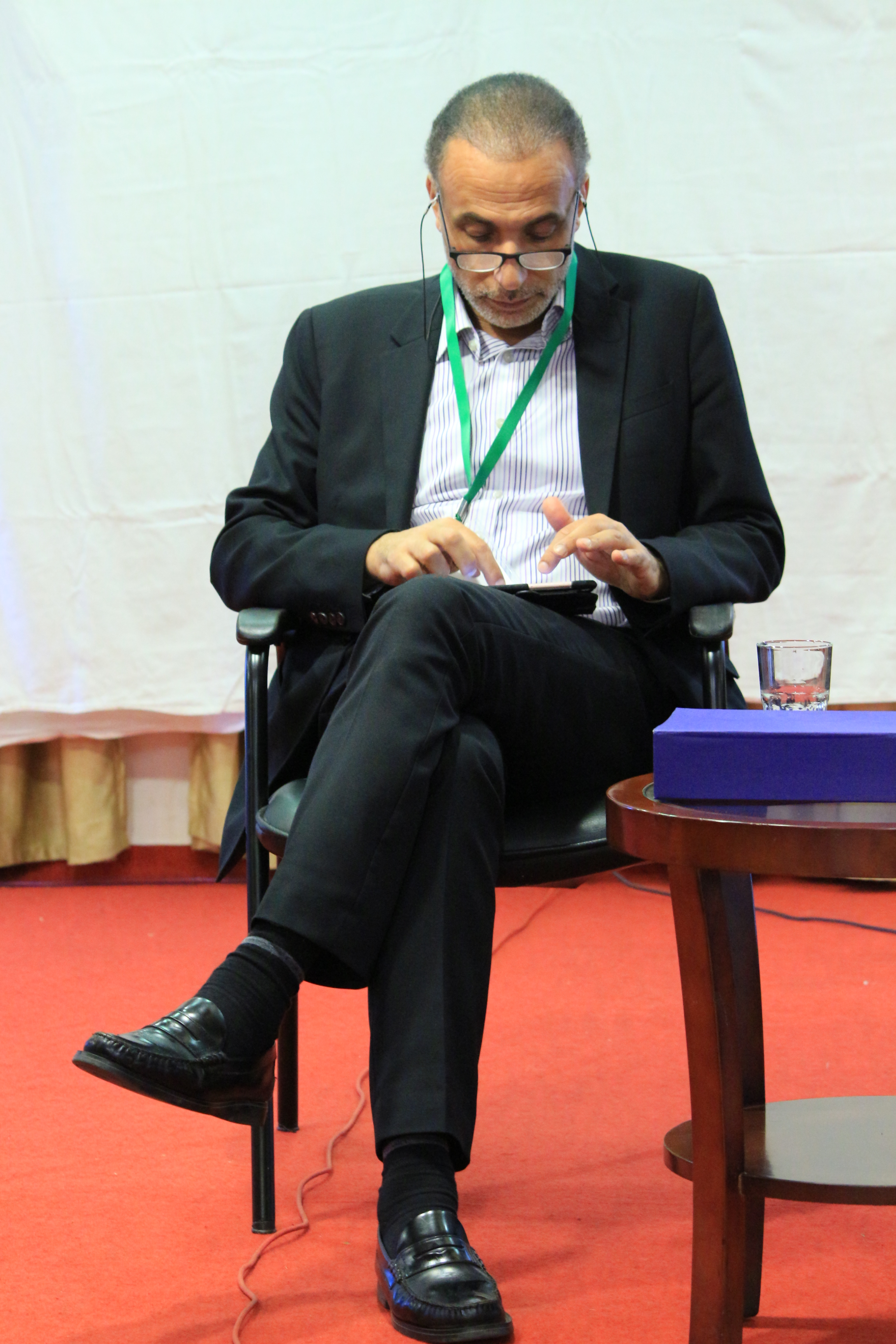
Tariq Ramadan at Al Jamia al Islamiya, Santhapuram, Kerala, India on 20 December 2017

Ramadan denies contacts with terrorists or other Islamic fundamentalists and the charges of antisemitism and double talk, attributing the charges to misinterpretation and an unfamiliarity with his writings. He stated: "I have often been accused of this 'double discourse', and to those who say it, I say – bring the evidence. I am quite clear in what I say. The problem is that many people don't want to hear it, particularly in the media. Most of the stories about me are completely untrue: journalists simply repeat black propaganda from the internet without any corroboration, and it just confirms what they want to believe. Words are used out of context. There is double-talk, yes, but there is also double-hearing. That is what I want to challenge." In answer to criticism of his response to 11 September, Ramadan replied that two days after the attacks he had published an open letter, exhorting Muslims to condemn the attacks and the attackers, and not to "hide behind conspiracy theories." and that less than two weeks after the attacks he had stated that "The probability [of bin Laden's guilt] is large, but some questions remain unanswered. ... But whoever they are, Bin Laden or others, it is necessary to find them and that they be judged", and that the interview had been conducted before any evidence was publicly available.

==== Public reception ====
In a free internet poll by Foreign Policy magazine, Ramadan was listed as one of the 100 top global thinkers in 2008, 2009, 2010 and 2012.

== Sexual assault allegations and convictions ==
=== Allegations (2017–2020) ===
In October 2017, secular activist Henda Ayari filed a complaint with the prosecutor's office of Rouen, stating that Ramadan had sexually assaulted her in a Paris hotel. Ayari had previously described the alleged incident in her 2016 book J’ai choisi d’être libre (in English I Chose to be Free), but had not revealed the real name of her attacker.

Ramadan's lawyer, Yassine Bouzrou, has said he would file a counter-suit for defamation. Bouzrou told the French paper Le Parisien that he denied the allegations and would file a complaint for defamation to Rouen prosecutors.

A few days after Ayari, a second woman filed a complaint stating that Ramadan raped her. The disabled 45-year-old French convert to Islam, known in media reports as Christelle, says Ramadan in 2009 lured her into his hotel room where he assaulted and raped her. A third woman claimed Ramadan had sent her "pornographic" messages and later tried to blackmail and manipulate her.

Four other Swiss women subsequently came forth in early November 2017 with allegations that Ramadan molested them when they were teenagers. The claimants include one woman who says that Ramadan made advances when she was 14 years old, and another who claims she had sexual relations with Ramadan when she was 15. Ramadan has denied the accusations.

On 4 November 2017, the satirical French newspaper Charlie Hebdo published a cover story on the Ramadan affair. On 7 November 2017, the University of Oxford announced that, "by mutual agreement, and with immediate effect" Ramadan "has taken a leave of absence". The statement noted that an "agreed leave of absence implies no acceptance or presumption of guilt". On 9 November 2017, the French weekly news magazine L'Obs published a cover story covering the allegations. In January 2018, Ramadan was denied entry to Qatar as a consequence of the scandal.

On 31 January 2018, Ramadan was taken into custody by French police. After two days of questioning, he was formally charged with two counts of rape and ordered to remain in custody. He was held in the Fleury-Mérogis prison, Essonne.

In March 2018, a third woman came forward alleging that she was raped by Ramadan on multiple occasions in France, Brussels and London between 2013 and 2014. Shortly thereafter, a fourth woman filed a police complaint alleging she had been raped by Ramadan. An American now living in Kuwait, she alleged that Ramadan had assaulted her in Washington DC in August 2013. No charges emerged from this complaint.

In April 2018, the Belgian judiciary reported that Ramadan had paid €27,000 three years earlier to a Belgian-Moroccan woman in exchange for the deletion of online posts revealing their affair. In the posts, she had detailed Ramadan's alleged "psychological grip" on her.

On 13 April 2018, the Swiss newspaper La Tribune de Genève reported that a woman had come forward to the authorities in Geneva and accused Ramadan of a sexual assault involving aggravating cruelty in September 2008. The National reported that he allegedly "raped her and held her against her will for several hours in a Geneva hotel room".

Later in April 2018, Ramadan admitted that he had been in a sexual relationship with the third rape complainant, who had presented to investigators a dress reportedly stained with his semen, but he insisted that it was always consensual.

In May 2018, Ayari modified aspects of her account, according to her based on her diary records, saying that the encounter took place in March 2012 at the Crown Plaza hotel in Paris' Place de la Republique.

In a newspaper blog, British journalist Peter Oborne criticized what he saw as failings in the French justice system and hypocrisy of prominent French public figures such as Manuel Valls pointing out that others accused of rape in France "await their fate in freedom". Regarding such sympathy for Ramadan over his detention, Henda Ayari, the first of his accusers, said that he is undeserving of sympathy. "It is for the courts to decide," she said. "Eventually, if French justice says he is guilty, those people may regret their support."

In June, Ramadan admitted to having five extramarital affairs, saying that he sometimes acted in ways that were inconsistent with his principles. In that same month, the presiding judges also cleared him of the third accusation, because it had been a consensual extramarital affair, and he remains imprisoned for the first two.

In July, it was revealed that the first accuser, Henda Ayari, was at her younger brother's wedding on the date when she was allegedly raped.

In October, Ramadan admitted that he had consensual sex with Ayari and Christelle.

In August 2019, Ramadan faced a new accusation of raping a woman in May 2014 in Lyon, France.

In September 2019, Ramadan stated that the allegations from the women, the indictment for the rape, the jail custody, and the media coverage of the case against him were "state racism", and compared his own case with the Dreyfus affair. He stated: "Is there not a similarity between Dreyfus affair and Ramadan affair? Nobody can deny the anti-Muslim racism that has grown in this country [France] and which is sustained daily by the politicians and the journalists. Dreyfus who was Jew yesterday is Muslim today". This comparison caused indignation among both French and also Muslim communities. Among others the editor Laurent Joffrin, in his Libération, labelled Ramadan's comparison as "ridiculous" and pointed out: "Dreyfus was innocently convicted by false evidence and sent to the prison house. Ramadan is prosecuted but not convicted, and if he gets convicted, then it would be because of the evidence, not because of his religion".

In February 2020, Ramadan was formally charged with raping two more women.

=== Swiss conviction (2008 offence) ===
Ramadan was convicted of rape and sexual coercion by a Swiss appeals court in September 2024 in relation to a 2008 incident in Geneva, and sentenced to three years' imprisonment, with two years suspended. His appeal to the Federal Supreme Court of Switzerland was rejected in August 2025, making the conviction final.

He had previously been acquitted of the same charges by a Swiss court in May 2023, before the decision was overturned on appeal.

=== French conviction (2009–2016 offences) ===
In March 2026, the Paris criminal court convicted Ramadan of rape and rape of a vulnerable person in relation to offences committed between 2009 and 2016, and sentenced him to 18 years' imprisonment.

Ramadan was tried in absentia after he failed to appear in court; a medical assessment found him fit to stand trial. The court issued an arrest warrant following the verdict. The judgment is not final and may be appealed.

The sentence included eight years of judicial supervision, a prohibition on contact with the victims, and a permanent ban from French territory after completion of the sentence.

=== Declining health ===
Since his initial detention, Ramadan has been hospitalized several times for multiple sclerosis. His attorney claimed that several doctors have said his condition is "incompatible with detention"; however, the court insisted on maintaining his detention after multiple hospital exams and medical consultations indicated that his condition was compatible with detention.

== Bibliography ==
Ramadan has authored around 30 books as well as "several hundred articles" in French and English, some of which have been translated into other languages.

=== Books published in French ===
- (1994, augmented in 1998) Les musulmans dans la laïcité: responsabilités et droits des musulmans dans les sociétés occidentales. Lyon: Tawhid. ISBN 978-2-90-908737-5
- (1995) Islam, le face à face des civilisations: quel projet pour quelle modernité?. Lyon: Tawhid. ISBN 978-2-90-908731-3
- (1998) Aux sources du renouveau musulmans: d'al-Afghānī à Ḥassan al-Bannā un siècle de réformisme islamique. Paris: Bayard Éditions/Centurion. ISBN 978-2-22-736314-4
- (1999) Peut-on vivre avec l'islam (with Jacques Neirynck). Lausanne: Favre. ISBN 978-2-82-890626-9
- (1999) Être musulman européen: étude des sources islamiques à la lumière du contexte européen (with Claude Dabbak). Lyon: Tawhid. ISBN 978-2-90-908743-6
- (2000) L'islam et les musulmans, grandeur et décadence: dans le quotidien de nos vies. Beirut: Éditions Al-Bouraq. ISBN 978-2-84-161008-2
- (2000) L'Islam en questions (with Alain Gresh). Paris: Sindbad: Actes Sud. ISBN 978-2-74-272916-6
- (2001) Entre l'homme et son cœur. Lyon: Tawhid. 978-2-90-908767-2
- (2001) Le face à face des civilisations: quel projet pour quelle modernité. Lyon: Tawhid. ISBN 978-2-90-908758-0
- (2002) De l'islam. Lyon: Tawhid. ISBN 978-2-90-908780-1
- (2002) Jihād, violence, guerre et paix en islam. Lyon: Tawhid. ISBN 978-2-90-908784-9
- (2002) Dār ash-shahāda: l'Occident, espace du témoignage. Lyon: Tawhid. ISBN 978-2-90-908783-2
- (2002) Musulmans d'occident: construire et contribuer. Lyon: Tawhid. ISBN 978-2-90-908781-8
- (2002) La foi, la voie et la résistance. Lyon: Tawhid. ISBN 978-2-90-908782-5
- (2003) Le saint Coran, chapitre ʿAmma: avec la traduction en langue française du sens de ses versets. Lyon: Tawhid. ISBN 978-2-84-862003-9
- (2003) Arabes et musulmans face à la mondialisation: le défi du pluralisme. Lyon: Tawhid. ISBN 978-2-84-862017-6
- (2003) Les musulmans d'Occident et l'avenir de l'islam. Paris: Sindbad: Actes Sud. ISBN 978-2-74-274005-5
- (2005) Faut-il faire taire Tariq Ramadan?: suivi d'un entretien avec Tariq Ramadan (with Aziz Zemouri). Paris: L'Archipel. ISBN 978-2-84-187647-1
- (2006) Muhammad vie du prophète: les enseignements spirituels et contemporains. Paris: Presses du Châtelet. ISBN 978-2-84-592201-3
- (2008) Un chemin, une vision: être les sujets de notre histoire. Lyon: Tawhid. ISBN 978-2-84-862149-4
- (2008) Face à nos peurs: le choix de la confiance. Lyon: Tawhid. ISBN 978-2-84-862148-7
- (2008) Quelques lettres du cœur. Lyon: Tawhid. ISBN 978-2-84-862147-0
- (2008) Faut-il avoir peur des religions? (with Élie Barnavi and Jean-Michel Di Falco Léandri). Paris: Éditions Mordicus. ISBN 978-2-75-570403-7
- (2008) Islam, la réforme radicale: éthique et libération. Paris: Presses du Châtelet. ISBN 978-2-84-592266-2
- (2009) Mon intime conviction. Paris: Presses du Châtelet. ISBN 978-2-84-592290-7
- (2009) L'autre en nous: pour une philosophie du pluralisme: essai. Paris: Presses du Châtelet. ISBN 978-2-84-592282-2
- (2011) L'islam et le réveil arabe. Paris: Presses du Châtelet. ISBN 978-2-84-592329-4
- (2014) Au péril des idées: les grandes questions de notre temps (with Edgar Morin). Paris: Presses du Châtelet. ISBN 978-2-84-592551-9
- (2014) De l'Islam et des musulmans: réflexions sur l'Homme, la réforme, la guerre et l'Occident. Paris: Presses du Châtelet. ISBN 978-2-84-592417-8
- (2015) Introduction à l'éthique islamique: les sources juridiques, philosophiques, mystiques et les questions contemporaines. Paris:Presses du Châtelet. ISBN 978-2-84-592607-3
- (2016) Le génie de l'islam. Paris: Presses du Châtelet. ISBN 978-2845926318

=== Books published in English ===
- (1999) To Be a European Muslim: a Study of Islamic Sources in the European Context. Leicester, UK: Islamic Foundation. ISBN 978-0-86-037300-1
- (1999) Muslims in France: the way towards coexistence. Markfield, Leicester, UK: Islamic Foundation. ISBN 978-0-86-037299-8
- (2001) Islam, the West and the Challenges of Modernity (with Saïd Amghar). Leicester, UK: Islamic Foundation. ISBN 978-0-86-037311-7
- (2004) Globalisation: Muslim resistances (multilingual: EN, FR, DE, IT, SP). Lyon: Tawhid. ISBN 978-2-84-862016-9
- (2004) Western Muslims and the Future of Islam. Oxford; New York: Oxford University Press. ISBN 978-0-19-803820-7
- (2007) In the Footsteps of the Prophet: Lessons from the Life of Muhammad. New York, NY: Oxford University Press. ISBN 978-0-19-530880-8
- (2007) The Messenger: the Meanings of the Life of Muhammad. London: Allen Lane. ISBN 978-0-71-399960-0 ISBN 978-1-84-614025-9
- (2008) Radical Reform: Islamic Ethics and Liberation. Oxford; New York: Oxford University Press. ISBN 978-0-19-533171-4
- (2009) What I Believe. New York: Oxford University Press. ISBN 978-0-19-538785-8
- (2010) The Quest for Meaning: Developing a Philosophy of Pluralism. London: Allen Lane. ISBN 978-1-84-614152-2 ISBN 978-1-84-614151-5
- (2011) On Super-Diversity (multilingual: EN, NL, AR). Rotterdam: Witte de With Publishers; Berlin: Sternberg Press. ISBN 978-1-93-410577-1
- (2012) Islam and the Arab Awakening. Oxford; New York: Oxford University Press. ISBN 978-0-19-993373-0
- (2012) The Arab Awakening: Islam and the New Middle East. London: Allen Lane. ISBN 978-1-84-614650-3
- (2017) Islam: The Essentials. London: Pelican. ISBN 978-0141980508
- (2017) Introduction to Islam. Oxford University Press. ISBN 978-0190467487
