= Henri Skoda =

French mathematician

Henri Skoda (born 1945) is a French mathematician, specializing in the analysis of several complex variables.

Skoda studied from 1964 at l'École normale supérieure and received there in 1967 his agrégation in mathematics. He received in 1972 his Ph.D. from the University of Nice Sophia Antipolis under André Martineau (primary advisor) and Pierre Lelong (secondary advisor) with thesis Étude quantitative des sous-ensembles analytiques de C^{n} et des idéaux de functions holomorphes. Skoda became a professor in Toulon and since 1976 has been a professor at the University of Paris VI.

For many years he ran an analysis seminar with Pierre Lelong and Pierre Dolbeault.

In 1978 Skoda received the Poncelet Prize and as an invited speaker at the International Congress of Mathematicians in Helsinki gave a talk Integral methods and zeros of holomorphic functions.

His doctoral students include Jean-Pierre Demailly.

== Selected publications ==
- "Sous-ensembles analytiques d'ordre fini ou infini dans C^{n}". Bulletin de la Société Mathématique de France. 100: 353–408. 1972.
- with Joël Briançon: "Sur la clôture intégrale d'un idéal de germes de fonctions holomorphes en un point de C^{n}". Comptes Rendus de l'Académie des Sciences, Série A. 278: 949–951. 1974. MR 0340642.
- "Application des techniques L^{2} à la théorie des idéaux d'une algèbre de fonctions holomorphes avec poids". Annales Scientifiques de l'École Normale Supérieure. 5 (4). 1972.
- "Valeurs au bord pour les solutions de l'opérateur d^{n}, et caractérisation des zéros des fonctions de la classe de Nevanlinna". Bulletin de la Société Mathématique de France. 104: 225–299. 1976.
- Skoda, Henri (1982). "Prolongement des courants, positifs, fermés de masse finie". Inventiones Mathematicae. 66 (3): 361–376. Bibcode:1982InMat..66..361S. doi:10.1007/bf01389217. S2CID 121894299.
- Skoda, H. (1977). "Fibrés holomorphes à base et à fibre de Stein". Inventiones Mathematicae. 43 (2): 97–107. Bibcode:1977InMat..43...97S. doi:10.1007/BF01390000. S2CID 121033608.
- "Morphismes surjectifs de fibrés vectoriels semi-positifs". Annales Scientifiques de l'École Normale Supérieure. 11 (4). 1978.
- "Solution à croissance du second problème de Cousin dans C^{n}". Annales de l'Institut Fourier. 21 (1). 1971.
- with J.-P. Demailly: Demailly, J. -P.; Skoda, H. (1980). "Relations entre les notions de positivités de P.A.Griffiths et de S.Nakano pour les fibrés vectoriels". Séminaire Pierre Lelong - Henri Skoda (Analyse) Années 1978/79. Lecture Notes in Mathematics. Vol. 822. Springer Berlin Heidelberg. pp. 304–309. doi:10.1007/BFb0097764. ISBN 978-3-540-10241-0.
- Skoda, Henri (1978). "Morphismes surjectifs et fibrés linéaires semi-positifs". Séminaire Pierre Lelong — Henri Skoda (Analyse) Année 1976/77. Lecture Notes in Mathematics. Vol. 694. Springer Berlin Heidelberg. pp. 290–324. doi:10.1007/BFb0063255. ISBN 978-3-540-09101-1.
- Skoda, Henri (1980). "Relèvement des sections globales dans les fibrés semi-positifs". Séminaire Pierre Lelong - Henri Skoda (Analyse) Années 1978/79. Lecture Notes in Mathematics. Vol. 822. Springer Berlin Heidelberg. pp. 259–303. doi:10.1007/BFb0097763. ISBN 978-3-540-10241-0.

== See also ==
- Briancon–Skoda theorem
- Skoda–El Mir theorem
