= Lycée-Collège Averroès =

Private Muslim high school and college in Lille, France

Coordinates: 50.6134°N 3.0545°E

Lycée-Collège Averroès is a private Muslim junior and senior high school/high school and sixth-form college in Lille, France. It contracted with the state and receives government subsidies, doing so since 2008; As of 2013 it is the only Islamic secondary school in France to do so. The Lycée is located in Lille-Sud adjacent to a mosque.

== History and mission ==
Opened in 2003, it is the first Muslim secondary school established in France. The school originally had 11 students.

The school was named after a 12th-century Andalusian-Arabian philosopher Ibn Rushd (also known as Averroes 1126-1198). The school's origins date back to 1994 when the Al-Imane Mosque began teaching 19 Muslim girls who were expelled from their public school for refusing to remove their headscarves. The school was officially established in 2003. It now has several hundred students and has been ranked as one of the top schools in the country.

The school aims to provide Muslim students with an alternative to the French public school education in the same way that French Catholics, Protestants and Jews do. In 2008, the school was granted the status of "sous contrat" meaning the French government pays teacher salaries and the school is required to follow the national curriculum. It began receiving government subsidies in 2008.

As of 2013 it had 340 students; the majority are low income and/or are of immigrant ancestry. Tuition differs depending on how much money a student's parents make, but it is about £1,000 British pounds annually.

By 2013 the school had a 100% pass rate in the French Baccalaureate. David Chazan of The Times wrote that this caused "soul-searching" in a country which emphasizes secular education.

== Leadership ==
The first headmistress of the school was Sylvie Taleb who later resigned in 2006.

The school's current director is El Hassan Oufker. Its deputy director is Makhlouf Mameche, who also serves as the vice president of the Union of Islamic Organisations of France (UOIF), which has been criticized for its connections to the Muslim Brotherhood.

The president of the association that manages Averroes High School, Amar Lasfar is also the president of the Union of Islamic Organizations of France and the rector of the Lille-Sud mosque.

== Funding ==
Before being granted the "sous contrat" status, the school relied on donations from the Muslim community of Nord-Pas-de-Calais.

The school relies upon large donations to expand its capabilities. While students do pay a small fee to attend the school, this is not enough to cover its expansion. The school's teachers are paid for by the state under the "sous contrat" designation.

Much of the school's funding comes from wealthy patrons such as Saudi Arabia and Qatar. The Saudi Development Bank paid 250,000 euros and Qatar Charity paid, in 2014, 800,000 euros for the school's most recent expansion. In 2014 the school received 350,000 euros from the Arab League.

On the October 27 2023 an advisory commissioned chaired by Georges-François Leclerc, perfect of the Hauts-de-France, voted to terminate public subsidies for the 2024 academic, worth c. 2,000,000 euros annually, for the school. The school appealed to the Council of state (France) in February for reconsideration. This marks the first time a private school lost its agreement with the state.

== Connections to the Muslim Brotherhood and UOIF ==
The opening of the school raised concern in secular France where even private religious schools are required to use the same core curriculum, can only teach religious subjects as electives, and where prayer must be optional. There was particular concern that the Al-Imane mosque is affiliated with the Union of Islamic Organizations in France, a powerful group that promotes a strict interpretation of Islam that includes grass-roots proselytizing, personal purification, and seeks to influence every aspect of a Muslim's life. The UOIF has been described as inseparable from the Muslim Brotherhood. In a report commissioned by the French government, the Muslim Brotherhood in Europe, as represented by the UOIF are the source of half of the institutional projects in France aiming to re-Islamize the younger generations and maintain their cultural specificity while creating a Muslim citizenship.

The school's leadership consists of the president and the vice president of the UOIF thus creating an inevitable tie between the ideologies of the UOIF and the school.

The school, along with Lycée Al Kindi, was identified as being close to the Muslim Brotherhood in the report 'The Muslim Brotherhood and Political Islam in France' presented to the National Defence Council on May 21, 2025.

== Controversies ==
In the wake of the 2015 Charlie Hebdo attacks, French citizens grew increasingly concerned about the risk of fundamentalism in their schools. This, of course, turned an eye towards Averroes High School, as the only "sous contrat" Muslim school in France. An investigative story by France 2 found that the school regularly presented opportunities for open dialogue advocating freedom of expression and discussion of terrorism, particularly in the philosophy class of Soufiane Zitouni.

After the attack, Zitouni published an article called "Today, The Prophet is Also Charlie" which caused considerable backlash at the school. Zitouni says that he was warned by administrators that his article would cause him to gain enemies and that he should "look behind himself while walking in the street". Afterwards, another teacher who was close to Tariq and Hani Ramadan, the grandsons of Muslim Brotherhood founder Hassan al-Banna, published a replica article criticizing Zitouni's reasoning and stating that the attack on Charlie Hebdo was understandable under the premise that they espouse racist ideas. This led to a series of comments by students lauding the attacks against Charlie Hebdo. Zitouni says that the school turned a blind eye to these inflammatory comments.

Zitouni alleged that anti-Semitism was pervasive among the student body. He also claimed that students frequently criticized his "Islamic unorthodoxy" and questioned his legitimacy as a philosophy teacher. Zitouni also suspected that the school was part of Qatar's attempt to bring their strict Islam into French society.

In February 2015, Soufiane Zitouni resigned from his teaching position at the school saying that the school fostered extremism and was indoctrinating political Islam while still receiving government funding. Zitouni alleged that the school turned a blind eye when two of its students openly supported the Kouachi brothers, who carried out the Charlie Hebdo attack in January 2015. The school filed a defamation complaint against Zitouni.

There have been many questions about whether the school takes the UOIF's more fundamentalist view of the West's alleged debauchery and condemns things such as pre-marital sex or homosexuality, and how this may create a hostile environment towards Western activities.

Accusations have been made both by Zitouni and others that the school outwardly presents a moderate image that complies with the French requirements to receive funding while internally promoting radical views.

In December 2024, local officials from the Minister of the Interior confirming the schools suspension of funding cited "serious breaches of the fundamental principles of the Republic" alongside accusations of opaque financial management as justification to suspend subsidies. In particular, government officials criticised the inclusion of an annotated translation of Al-Nawawi's Forty Hadith on a teachers' reading list for a non-obligatory ethnics edition. Headmaster of the school Éric Dufour insisted that the book was never physically on school grounds nor used by teachers. In April 2025, the Administrative Court of Lille annulled the termination of the association agreement with the state. The Minister of National Education indicated that she would appeal the decision.
