= Skoda–El Mir theorem =

The Skoda–El Mir theorem is a theorem of complex geometry, stated as follows:

Theorem (Skoda, El Mir, Sibony). Let X be a complex manifold, and E a closed complete pluripolar set in X. Consider a closed positive current $\Theta$ on $X \backslash E$ which is locally integrable around E. Then the trivial extension of $\Theta$ to X is closed on X.
