= Subharmonic function =

Class of mathematical functions

In mathematics, subharmonic and superharmonic functions are important classes of functions used extensively in partial differential equations, complex analysis and potential theory.

Intuitively, subharmonic functions are related to convex functions of one variable as follows. If the graph of a convex function and a line intersect at two points, then the graph of the convex function is below the line between those points. In the same way, if the values of a subharmonic function are no larger than the values of a harmonic function on the boundary of a ball, then the values of the subharmonic function are no larger than the values of the harmonic function also inside the ball.

Superharmonic functions can be defined by the same description, only replacing "no larger" with "no smaller". Alternatively, a superharmonic function is just the negative of a subharmonic function, and for this reason any property of subharmonic functions can be easily transferred to superharmonic functions.

== Formal definition ==
Formally, the definition can be stated as follows. Let $G$ be a subset of the Euclidean space $\R^n$ and let
$$\varphi \colon G \to \R \cup \{ - \infty \}$$
be an upper semi-continuous function. Then, $\varphi$ is called subharmonic if for any closed ball $\overline{B(x,r)}$ of center $x$ and radius $r$ contained in $G$ and every real-valued continuous function $h$ on $\overline{B(x,r)}$ that is harmonic in $B(x,r)$ and satisfies $\varphi(y) \leq h(y)$ for all $y$ on the boundary $\partial B(x,r)$ of $B(x,r)$, we have $\varphi(y) \leq h(y)$ for all $y \in B(x,r).$

Note that by the above, the function which is identically −∞ is subharmonic, but some authors exclude this function by definition.

A function $u$ is called superharmonic if $-u$ is subharmonic.

== Properties ==
- A function is harmonic if and only if it is both subharmonic and superharmonic.
- If $\phi$ is C^{2} (twice continuously differentiable) on an open set $G$ in $\R^n$, then $\phi$ is subharmonic if and only if one has $\Delta \phi \geq 0$ on $G$, where $\Delta$ is the Laplacian.
- The maximum of a subharmonic function cannot be achieved in the interior of its domain unless the function is constant, which is called the maximum principle. However, the minimum of a subharmonic function can be achieved in the interior of its domain.
- Subharmonic functions make a convex cone, that is, a linear combination of subharmonic functions with positive coefficients is also subharmonic.
- The pointwise maximum of two subharmonic functions is subharmonic. If the pointwise maximum of a countable number of subharmonic functions is upper semi-continuous, then it is also subharmonic.
- The limit of a decreasing sequence of subharmonic functions is subharmonic (or identically equal to $-\infty$).
- Subharmonic functions are not necessarily continuous in the usual topology, however one can introduce the fine topology which makes them continuous.

== Examples ==
If $f$ is analytic then $\log|f|$ is subharmonic. More examples can be constructed by using the properties listed above, by taking maxima, convex combinations and limits. In dimension 1, all subharmonic functions can be obtained in this way.

== Riesz Representation Theorem ==
If $u$ is subharmonic in a region $D$, in Euclidean space of dimension $n$, $v$ is harmonic in $D$, and $u \leq v$, then $v$ is called a harmonic majorant of $u$. If a harmonic majorant exists, then there exists the least harmonic majorant, and
$$u(x) = v(x) - \int_D\frac{d\mu(y)}{|x-y|^{n-2}},\quad n\geq 3$$
while in dimension 2,
$$u(x) = v(x) + \int_D\log|x-y|d\mu(y),$$
where $v$ is the least harmonic majorant, and $\mu$ is a Borel measure in $D$. This is called the Riesz representation theorem.

== Subharmonic functions in the complex plane ==
Subharmonic functions are of a particular importance in complex analysis, where they are intimately connected to holomorphic functions.

One can show that a real-valued, continuous function $\varphi$ of a complex variable (that is, of two real variables) defined on a set $G\subset \Complex$ is subharmonic if and only if for any closed disc $D(z,r) \subset G$ of center $z$ and radius $r$ one has
$$\varphi(z) \leq \frac{1}{2\pi} \int_0^{2\pi} \varphi(z+ re^{i\theta}) \, d\theta.$$

Intuitively, this means that a subharmonic function is at any point no greater than the average of the values in a circle around that point, a fact which can be used to derive the maximum principle.

If $f$ is a holomorphic function, then
$$\varphi(z) = \log \left| f(z) \right|$$
is a subharmonic function if we define the value of $\varphi(z)$ at the zeros of $f$ to be $-\infty$. It follows that
$$\psi_\alpha(z) = \left| f(z) \right|^\alpha$$
is subharmonic for every α > 0. This observation plays a role in the theory of Hardy spaces, especially for the study of H^{p} when 0 < p < 1.

In the context of the complex plane, the connection to the convex functions can be realized as well by the fact that a subharmonic function $f$ on a domain $G \subset \Complex$ that is constant in the imaginary direction is convex in the real direction and vice versa.

=== Harmonic majorants of subharmonic functions ===
If $u$ is subharmonic in a region $\Omega$ of the complex plane, and $h$ is harmonic on $\Omega$, then $h$ is a harmonic majorant of $u$ in $\Omega$ if $u \leq h$ in $\Omega$. Such an inequality can be viewed as a growth condition on $u$.

=== Subharmonic functions in the unit disc. Radial maximal function ===
Let φ be subharmonic, continuous and non-negative in an open subset Ω of the complex plane containing the closed unit disc D(0, 1). The radial maximal function for the function φ (restricted to the unit disc) is defined on the unit circle by
$$(M \varphi)(e^{i\theta}) = \sup_{0 \le r < 1} \varphi(re^{i\theta}).$$
If P_{r} denotes the Poisson kernel, it follows from the subharmonicity that
$$0 \le \varphi(re^{i\theta}) \le \frac{1}{2\pi} \int_0^{2\pi} P_r\left(\theta- t\right) \varphi\left(e^{it}\right) \, dt, \ \ \ r < 1.$$
It can be shown that the last integral is less than the value at e^{iθ} of the Hardy–Littlewood maximal function φ^{∗} of the restriction of φ to the unit circle T,
$$\varphi^*(e^{i\theta}) = \sup_{0 < \alpha \le \pi} \frac{1}{2 \alpha} \int_{\theta - \alpha}^{\theta + \alpha} \varphi\left(e^{it}\right) \, dt,$$
so that 0 ≤ M φ ≤ φ^{∗}. It is known that the Hardy–Littlewood operator is bounded on L^{p}(T) when 1 < p < ∞. It follows that for some universal constant C,
$$\|M \varphi\|_{L^2(\mathbf{T})}^2 \le C^2 \, \int_0^{2\pi} \varphi(e^{i\theta})^2 \, d\theta.$$

If f is a function holomorphic in Ω and 0 < p < ∞, then the preceding inequality applies to φ = |f |^{p/2}. It can be deduced from these facts that any function F in the classical Hardy space H^{p} satisfies
$$\int_0^{2\pi} \left( \sup_{0 \le r < 1} \left|F(r e^{i\theta})\right| \right)^p \, d\theta \le C^2 \, \sup_{0 \leq r < 1} \int_0^{2\pi} \left|F(re^{i\theta})\right|^p \, d\theta.$$
With more work, it can be shown that F has radial limits F(e^{iθ}) almost everywhere on the unit circle, and (by the dominated convergence theorem) that F_{r}, defined by F_{r}(e^{iθ}) = F(r e^{iθ}) tends to F in L^{p}(T).

== Subharmonic functions on Riemannian manifolds ==
Subharmonic functions can be defined on an arbitrary Riemannian manifold.

Definition: Let M be a Riemannian manifold, and $f:\; M \to \R$ an upper semicontinuous function. Assume that for any open subset $U\subset M$, and any harmonic function f_{1} on U, such that $f_1 \geq f$ on the boundary of U, the inequality $f_1 \geq f$ holds on all U. Then f is called subharmonic.

This definition is equivalent to one given above. Also, for twice differentiable functions, subharmonicity is equivalent to the inequality $\Delta f \geq 0$, where $\Delta$ is the usual Laplacian.

== See also ==
- Plurisubharmonic function — generalization to several complex variables
- Classical fine topology
