= Lycée Faidherbe =

School in Lille, France

Coordinates: 50.6150°N 3.0750°E

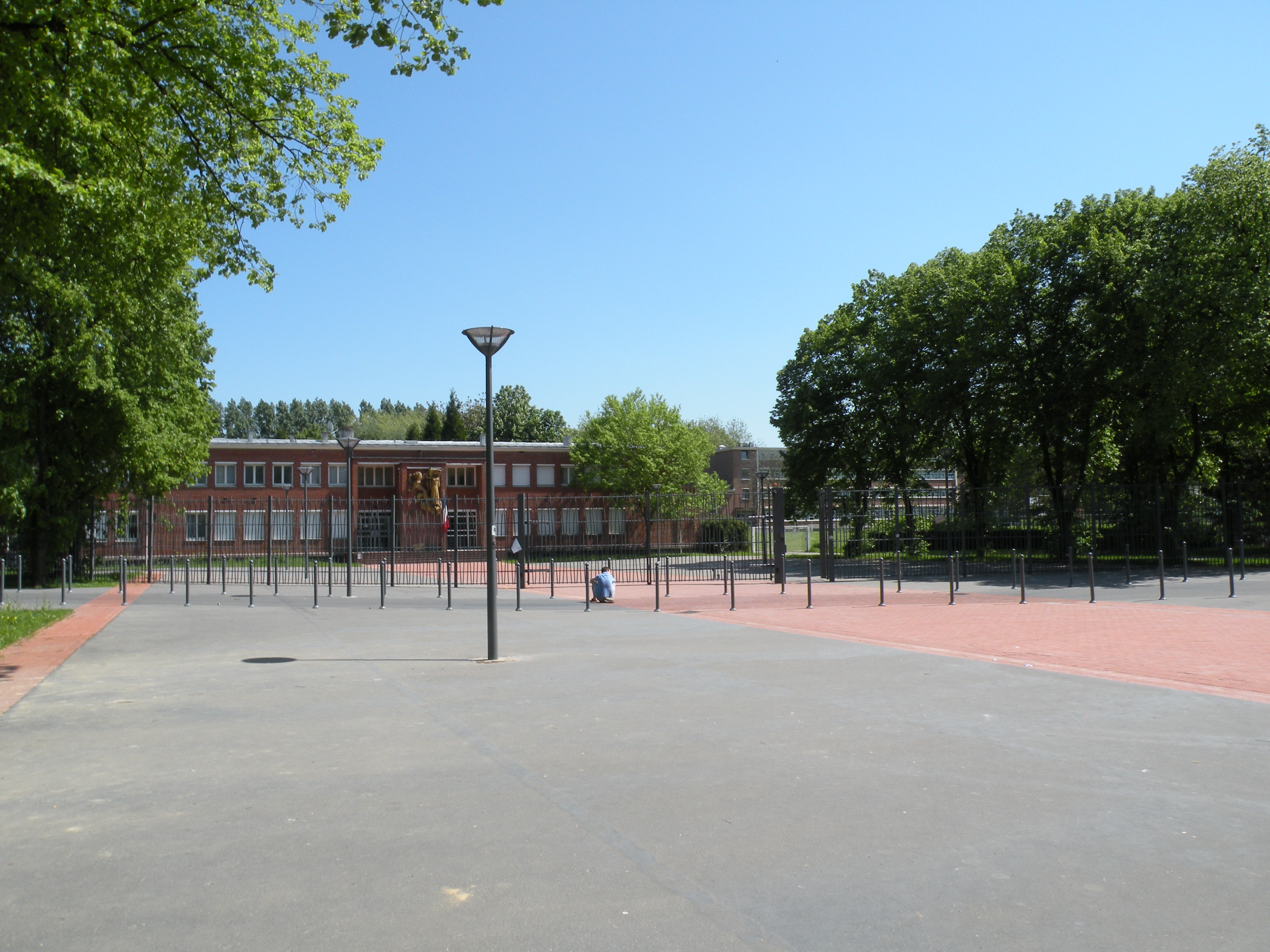
Entrance

Lycée Faidherbe is a senior high school/sixth-form college in Lille, France.

It includes a boarding facility for Classe préparatoire aux grandes écoles (CPGE) students.

== Notable alumni ==
- Bernard Arnault, billionaire businessman
- Jean-Pierre Demailly, mathematician
