= Bob Dylan bibliography =

List of books published by and about Bob Dylan

This is a list of books published by and about Bob Dylan.

== Books by Bob Dylan ==
- Dylan, Bob (1971). Tarantula. Macmillan. ISBN 0-261-63337-6.
- —— (1973). Writings and Drawings by Bob Dylan. Jonathan Cape. ISBN 0-224-00867-6.
- —— (1985). Lyrics: 1962–1985. Knopf. ISBN 978-0-394-54278-2.
- —— (2004). Chronicles: Volume One. Simon & Schuster. ISBN 0-7432-2815-4.
- —— (2004). Lyrics: 1962–2001. Simon & Schuster. ISBN 0-7432-3944-X.
- —— (2014). The Lyrics: Since 1962. Simon & Schuster. ISBN 978-1-4767-9770-0. Edited by Christopher Ricks, Lisa Nemrow, Julie Nemrow.
- —— (2017). The Nobel Lecture. Simon & Schuster. ISBN 978-1-5011-8940-1.
- —— (2022). The Philosophy of Modern Song. Simon & Schuster. ISBN 978-1-4516-4870-6.

== Art books by Bob Dylan ==
- Dylan, Bob (1994). Drawn Blank. Random House. ISBN 978-0-679-41788-0.
- —— (2008). The Drawn Blank Series. Prestel. ISBN 978-3-7913-3943-6.
- —— (2010). The Brazil Series. Prestel. ISBN 978-3-7913-5098-1.
- —— (2011). The Asia Series. Gagosian Gallery. ISBN 978-1-935263-47-0.
- —— (2013). Revisionist Art: Thirty Works by Bob Dylan. Abrams. ISBN 978-1-4197-0979-1.
- —— (2014). Bob Dylan: Face Value. National Portrait Gallery. ISBN 978-1-85514-480-4.
- —— (2016). The Beaten Path. Halcyon Gallery. ISBN 978-1-907849-39-8.
- —— (2018). Mondo Scripto. Halcyon Gallery. ISBN 978-1-907849-44-2.
- —— (2023). Bob Dylan: Retrospectrum. Skira Editore. ISBN 978-88-572-4902-5.
- —— (2025). Bob Dylan: Point Blank (Quick Studies). Halcyon Gallery. ISBN 978-1-6682-2221-8.

== Interviews with Bob Dylan ==
- Ellison, Jim (2004). Younger Than That Now: The Collected Interviews with Bob Dylan. Thunder's Mouth Press. ISBN 1-56025-590-0.
- Burger, Jeff (2018). Dylan on Dylan: Interviews and Encounters. Chicago Review Press. ISBN 978-0-912777-42-9.
- Cott, Jonathan (2006). Bob Dylan: The Essential Interviews. Wenner Books. ISBN 978-1932958096.

== Biographies of Bob Dylan ==
- Bell, Ian (2012). Once Upon a Time: The Lives of Bob Dylan. Mainstream Publishing. ISBN 978-1-78057-573-5.
- —— (2013). Time Out of Mind: The Lives of Bob Dylan. Mainstream Publishing. ISBN 978-1-78057-577-3.
- Cott, Jonathan (1984). Dylan. Rolling Stone Press. ISBN 0-09-158750-6.
- Dalton, David (2012). Who Is That Man?: In Search of the Real Bob Dylan. New York: Hyperion. ISBN 978-1-4013-2339-4.
- Epstein, Daniel Mark (2011). The Ballad of Bob Dylan: A Portrait. HarperCollins. ISBN 978-0-285-64082-5.
- Hajdu, David (2001). Positively Fourth Street: The Lives and Times of Joan Baez, Bob Dylan, Mimi Baez Fariña and Richard Fariña. Farrar, Straus and Giroux. ISBN 0-7475-5826-4.
- Heylin, Clinton (1996). Bob Dylan: A Life In Stolen Moments: Day by Day 1941–1995. Schirmer Books. ISBN 0-7119-5669-3.
- —— (2000). Bob Dylan: Behind the Shades: Take Two. Viking. ISBN 0-670-88506-1.
- —— (2011). Bob Dylan: Behind the Shades: 20th Anniversary Edition. Faber and Faber. ISBN 978-0-571-27240-2.
- —— (2021). The Double Life of Bob Dylan: Volume I: 1941–1966 A Restless, Hungry Feeling. Bodley Head. ISBN 978-1-84792-588-6.
- —— (2023). The Double Life of Bob Dylan Volume 2: 1966–2021: "Far away from Myself". Bodley Head. ISBN 978-1-84792-589-3.
- Leigh, Spencer (2020). Bob Dylan: Outlaw Blues. McNidder and Grace. ISBN 978-0-85716-205-2.
- McDougal, Dennis (2014). Dylan: The Biography. John Wiley & Sons. ISBN 978-0-470-63623-7.
- Morley, Paul (2021). You Lose Yourself You Reappear: Bob Dylan and the Voices of a Lifetime. Simon & Schuster. ISBN 978-1-4711-9514-3.
- Polito, Robert (2026). After the Flood: Inside Bob Dylan's Memory Palace (First hardcover ed.). New York: Liveright Publishing Corporation. ISBN 978-0871402936. OCLC 1536123457.
- Rotolo, Suze (2008). A Freewheelin' Time. Aurum Press. ISBN 978-1-84513-392-4.
- Scaduto, Anthony (1972). Bob Dylan. Sphere. ISBN 978-0-349-13128-3.
- Shelton, Robert (1986). No Direction Home: The Life and Music of Bob Dylan. New English Library. ISBN 0-450-04843-8.
- —— (2011). No Direction Home: The Life and Music of Bob Dylan (Revised & updated ed.). Omnibus Press. ISBN 978-1-84938-458-2.
- —— (2021). Thomson, Elizabeth (ed.). Bob Dylan: No Direction Home (Revised and Illustrated, with new Foreword and Afterword by Elizabeth Thomson ed.). Palazzo Editions. ISBN 978-1-78675-090-7.
- Sounes, Howard (2001). Down the Highway: The Life of Bob Dylan. Grove Press. ISBN 0-8021-1686-8.
- Spitz, Bob (1988). Dylan: A Biography. McGraw-Hill. ISBN 978-0-39330-769-6.
- Thompson, Toby (1972). Positively Main Street: An unorthodox view of Bob Dylan. New English Library. ISBN 0-450-01012-0.
- Williams, Richard (1992). Dylan: A Man Called Alias. Bloomsbury. ISBN 0-7475-1084-9.

== Books about Bob Dylan ==
- Barker, Derek (2008). The Songs He Didn't Write: Bob Dylan Under the Influence. Chrome Dreams. ISBN 978-1-84240-424-9.
- Bauldie, John, ed. (1992). Wanted Man: In Search of Bob Dylan. Penguin Books. ISBN 0-14-015361-6.
- Browning, Gary; Sandis, Constantine, eds. (2021). Dylan at 80: It Used to Go Like That and Now It Goes Like This. Imprint Academic. ISBN 978-1-78836-045-6.
- Cartwright, Bert (1992). The Bible in the Lyrics of Bob Dylan (Revised and enlarged ed.). Wanted Man. ISBN 0-947730-03-6. OCLC 1053918870.
- Corcoran, Neil, ed. (2002). "Do You, Mr Jones?" Bob Dylan with the Poets and Professors. Chatto & Windus. ISBN 0-7011-7280-0.
- Davidson, Mark; Fishel, Parker, eds. (2023). Bob Dylan: Mixing Up the Medicine. Callaway. ISBN 978-1-7345377-9-6.
- Dettmar, Kevin J., ed. (2008). The Cambridge Companion to Bob Dylan. Cambridge University Press. ISBN 978-0-521-71494-5.
- Dunn, Tim (2008). The Bob Dylan Copyright Files 1962–2007. Authorhouse. ISBN 978-1-4389-1589-0.
- Engel, Dave (1997). Just Like Bob Zimmerman's Blues: Dylan in Minnesota. River City Memoirs. ISBN 0-942495-61-6.
- Feinstein, Barry (1999). Early Dylan. Bullfinch Press. ISBN 978-0-8212-2534-9.
- Gans, Terry Alexander (1982). What's Real and What Is Not: Bob Dylan Through 1964: The Myth of Protest. Hobo Press. ISBN 3-923282-02-8.
- Gill, Andy (1998). Classic Bob Dylan: My Back Pages. Carlton. ISBN 1-85868-599-0.
- —— (2004). A Simple Twist of Fate: Bob Dylan and the Making of Blood on the Tracks. Da Capo. ISBN 0-306-81413-7.
- Gilmour, Michael J. (2011). The Gospel According to Bob Dylan. Louisville, KY: Westminster John Knox Press. ISBN 978-0-664-23207-8. OCLC 811563673.
- Goss, Nina, ed. (2018). Tearing the World Apart: Bob Dylan and the Twenty-First Century. University Press of Mississippi. ISBN 978-1-4968-1332-9.
- Gray, Michael (2000). Song & Dance Man III. Continuum. ISBN 978-1-4968-1332-9.
- —— (2006). The Bob Dylan Encyclopedia. Continuum International. ISBN 0-8264-6933-7.
- —— (2021). Outtakes on Bob Dylan. Route. ISBN 978-1-901927-86-3.
- Griffin, Sid (2007). Million Dollar Bash: Bob Dylan, the Band, and the Basement Tapes. Jawbone Press. ISBN 978-1-906002-05-3.
- —— (2014). Million Dollar Bash: Bob Dylan, the Band, and the Basement Tapes (Revised & updated ed.). Jawbone Press. ISBN 978-1-908279-69-9.
- Hedin, Benjamin (2004). Studio A: The Bob Dylan Reader. W. W. Norton & Company. ISBN 0-393-05844-1.
- Heylin, Clinton (1995). Bob Dylan: The Recording Sessions, 1960–1994. St. Martin's Griffin. ISBN 0-312-15067-9.
- —— (2009). Revolution in the Air: The Songs of Bob Dylan, Volume One: 1957–73. Constable. ISBN 978-1-84901-051-1.
- —— (2010). Still on the Road: The Songs of Bob Dylan, Volume Two: 1974–2008. Constable. ISBN 978-1-84901-011-5.
- —— (2016). Judas!: From Forest Hills to the Free Trade Hall: A Historical View of Dylan's Big Boo. Route Publishing. ISBN 978-1-901927-68-9.
- —— (2017). Trouble in Mind: Bob Dylan's Gospel Years: What Really Happened. Route Publishing. ISBN 978-1-901927-72-6.
- —— (2018). No One Else Could Play That Tune: The Making and Unmaking of Bob Dylan's 1974 Masterpiece. Route Publishing. ISBN 978-1-901927-76-4.
- Hinchey, John (2002). Like a Complete Unknown: The Poetry of Bob Dylan's Songs, 1962–1969. Stealing Home Press. ISBN 0-9723592-0-6.
- Hughes, John (2016). Invisible Now: Bob Dylan in the 1960s. Routledge. ISBN 978-1-138-26876-0.
- Humphries, Patrick (1991). Oh No! Not Another Bob Dylan Book. Square One Books. ISBN 1-872747-04-3.
- Kelly, Roy (2015). Bob Dylan Dream: My Life with Bob. Pembury House Publishing. ISBN 978-0-9929956-8-3.
- Kinney, David (2014). The Dylanologists: Adventures in the Land of Bob. Simon & Schuster. ISBN 978-1-4516-2692-6.
- Kramer, Daniel (1967). Bob Dylan. Citadel Press. OCLC 560669300.
- —— (1991). Bob Dylan: A Portrait of the Artist's Early Years. Plexus Publishing. ISBN 0-85965-188-6.
- —— (2016). Bob Dylan: A Year and a Day. Taschen. ISBN 978-3-8365-4760-4.
- Latham, Sean, ed. (2021). The World of Bob Dylan. Cambridge University Press. ISBN 978-1-108-49951-4.
- Lee, C. P. (1998). Like The Night: Bob Dylan and the Road to the Manchester Free Trade Hall. Helter Skelter. ISBN 1-900924-07-2.
- —— (2000). Like a Bullet of Light: The Films of Bob Dylan. Helter Skelter. ISBN 1-900924-06-4.
- Marcus, Greil (1997). Invisible Republic: Bob Dylan's Basement Tapes. Picador. ISBN 0-330-33624-X.
- —— (2005). Like a Rolling Stone: Bob Dylan at the Crossroads. PublicAffairs. ISBN 1-58648-382-X.
- —— (2013). Bob Dylan by Greil Marcus: Writings 1968–2010. PublicAffairs. ISBN 978-1-61039-199-3.
- —— (2022). Folk Music: A Bob Dylan Biography in Seven Songs. Yale University Press. ISBN 978-0-300-25531-7.
- Marqusee, Mike (2005). Wicked Messenger: Bob Dylan and the 1960s. Seven Stories Press. ISBN 1-58322-686-9.
- Marshall, Lee (2007). Bob Dylan: The Never Ending Star. Polity. ISBN 978-0-7456-3642-9.
- Marshall, Scott (2002). Restless Pilgrim: The Spiritual Journey of Bob Dylan. Relevant Books. ISBN 0-9714576-2-X.
- —— (2017). Bob Dylan: A Spiritual Life. BP Books. ISBN 978-1-944229-64-1.
- McCarron, Andrew (2017). Light Come Shining: The Transformations of Bob Dylan. Oxford University Press. ISBN 978-0-19-931347-1.
- McGregor, Craig (1972). Bob Dylan: A Retrospective. William Morrow & Co. ISBN 0-688-06025-0.
- Mellers, Wilfrid (1984). A Darker Shade of Pale: A Backdrop to Bob Dylan. Faber and Faber. ISBN 0-571-13345-2.
- Mensema, Bill (2009). Fietsen Met Bob Dylan. Passage. ISBN 978-90-5452-208-9.
- Muir, Andrew (2001). Razor's Edge: Bob Dylan & the Never Ending Tour. Helter Skelter. ISBN 1-900924-13-7.
- —— (2003). Troubadour: Early & Late Songs of Bob Dylan. Woodstock Publications. ISBN 0-9544945-0-4.
- —— (2013). One More Night: Bob Dylan's Never Ending Tour. Andrew Muir. ISBN 978-1-4826-3236-1.
- —— (2019). The True Performing of it: Bob Dylan & William Shakespeare. Red Planet Books. ISBN 978-1-912733-95-8.
- Otiono, Nduka; Toth, Josh, eds. (2019). Polyvocal Bob Dylan: Music, Performance, Literature. Palgrave Studies in Music and Literature. Cham, Switzerland: Palgrave Macmillan. doi:10.1007/978-3-030-17042-4. ISBN 978-3-030-17042-4. S2CID 239395870.
- Padgett, Ray (2023). Pledging My Time: Conversations with Bob Dylan Band Members. EWP Press. ISBN 979-8-9881781-1-8.
- Pichaske, David (2010). Song of the North Country: A Midwest Framework to the Songs of Bob Dylan. Continuum. ISBN 978-1-4411-4232-0.
- Polizzotti, Mark (2006). Highway 61 Revisited. Continuum. ISBN 0-8264-1775-2.
- Ribakove, Sy; Ribakove, Barbara (1966). Folk-Rock: The Bob Dylan Story. Dell book 2643. New York: Dell Pub. Co. LCCN 66016579. OCLC 3270681.
- Ricks, Christopher (2003). Dylan's Visions of Sin. Penguin/Viking. ISBN 0-670-80133-X.
- Riley, Tim (1999). Hard Rain: A Dylan Commentary. Da Capo Press. ISBN 978-0306809071.
- Rollason, Christopher (2021). Read Books, Repeat Quotations: The Literary Bob Dylan. Two Riders. ISBN 978-1-9196390-0-0.
- Rosenbaum, Ron (2025). Bob Dylan: Things Have Changed. Melville House. ISBN 978-1685892258.
- Sanders, Daryl (2018). That Thin, Wild Mercury Sound: Dylan, Nashville, and the Making of Blonde on Blonde. Chicago Review Press. ISBN 978-1-61373-547-3.
- Santelli, Robert (2005). The Bob Dylan Scrapbook. Simon & Schuster. ISBN 978-0-7432-2828-2.
- Scaduto, Anthony (1979) [1971]. Bob Dylan: An Intimate Biography (Single volume reprint ed.). New York: Signet. ISBN 0451086090. OCLC 473102747. Contains a new foreword.
- Schatzberg, Jerry (2006). Thin Wild Mercury—Touching Dylan's Edge: The Photography. Genesis Publications. ISBN 0-904351-99-8.
- Shain, Britta Lee (2016). Seeing the Real You at Last. Jawbone Press. ISBN 978-1-908279-94-1.
- Shepard, Sam (1978). Rolling Thunder Logbook. Penguin Books. ISBN 0-14-004750-6.
- Sloman, Larry (1978). On the Road with Bob Dylan: Rolling with the Thunder. Bantam Books. ISBN 0-553-11641-X.
- Smith, Michael Glover (2026). Bob Dylan as Filmmaker: No Time to Think. McNidder & Grace. ISBN 978-0857162991.
- Taylor, Jeff; Israelson, Chad (2015). The Political World of Bob Dylan: Freedom and Justice, Power and Sin. New York: Palgrave Macmillan. doi:10.1057/9781137477477. ISBN 978-1-137-48234-1.
- Thomas, Richard (2017). Why Bob Dylan Matters. Dey Street Books. ISBN 978-0-06-268573-5.
- Thomson, Elizabeth, ed. (1990). The Dylan Companion. Macmillan Publishers. ISBN 0-333-49826-7.
- Thompson, Toby (1971). Positively Main Street: An Unorthodox View of Bob Dylan. New York: Coward-McCann. ISBN 978-0698103054. LCCN 79-136449. OCLC 1153560753.
- Trager, Oliver (2004). Keys to the Rain. New York: Billboard Books. ISBN 0-8230-7974-0.
- Wald, Elijah (2015). Dylan Goes Electric!: Newport, Seeger, Dylan, and the Night That Split the Sixties. Dey Street Books. ISBN 978-0-06-236668-9.
- Weberman, A. J. (2005). Dylan to English Dictionary. Yippie Museum Press. ISBN 978-1-4196-1338-8.
- Wilentz, Sean (2009). Bob Dylan in America. The Bodley Head. ISBN 978-1-84792-150-5.
- —— (2026). Bob Dylan: Through the Open Window (1956-1963). Harry N. Abrams. ISBN 978-1419791758.
- Williams, Paul (1980). Dylan—What Happened?. Entwhistle Books. ISBN 978-0-89708-021-7.
- —— (1991). Bob Dylan, Performing Artist: The Early Years 1960–1973. Underwood-Miller. ISBN 0-88733-131-9.
- —— (2004). Bob Dylan, Performing Artist: The Middle Years (1974–1986). Omnibus Press. ISBN 1-84449-096-3.
- —— (2005). Bob Dylan, Performing Artist: Mind Out Of Time (1986–1990 & Beyond). Omnibus Press. ISBN 1-84449-831-X.
- Williamson, Nigel (2004). The Rough Guide to Bob Dylan. Rough Guides. ISBN 1-84353-139-9.
- Windolf, Jim (2026). Where the Music Had to Go: How Bob Dylan and The Beatles Changed Each Other – and the World. Scribner. ISBN 978-1399627849.
- Wolff, Daniel (2017). Grown-Up Anger: The Connected Mysteries of Bob Dylan, Woody Guthrie, and the Calumet Massacre of 1913. Harper. ISBN 978-0-06-245169-9.

== Books by Bob Dylan translated into Spanish ==
- Letras completes; Traductores: Miquel Izquierdo, José Moreno, Diego A. Manrique Ed. Malpaso. 2016.
- Canciones; selección, traducción y prólogo de Eduardo Chamorro, Visor, 1971.
- George Jackson y otras canciones; (selección y traducción de Antonio Resines), Visor, 1972; reedición, 1996.
- Escritos, canciones y dibujos; Editorial R. Aguilera/Ediciones Castilla, 1975 - Versión bilingüe (inglés/castellano) of Writings and Drawings by Bob Dylan, originally published by Alfred A. Knopf (1973).
- Canciones 1, Editorial Fundamentos, colección Espiral, Madrid, 1984 - Comprende las canciones de Dylan editadas en sus álbumes oficiales desde 1961 hasta 1965.
- Canciones 2, Editorial Fundamentos, colección Espiral, Madrid, 1985 - Comprende las canciones de Dylan editadas en sus álbumes oficiales desde "Blonde On Blonde" hasta "Blood On The Tracks", de 1966 a 1974.
- The 30th Anniversary Concert Celebration (traducción de Alberto Manzano). Celeste ediciones, Madrid, 1993.
- Greatest Hits/Unplugged; (traducción de Alberto Manzano). Celeste ediciones, Madrid, 1995.
- Del huracán a las tierras altas 1975-1997. Escritos y canciones (traducción de Antonio J. Iriarte y Francisco J. García Cubero), Valencia, 1999.
- Tarántula (trad. de Gabriel Zadunaisky), Granica Editor, Argentina, 1973.
- Tarántula (trad. de Ignacio Renom), Ed. Júcar, Colección Los Juglares, Madrid, 1996.
- Tarántula (Trad. de Alberto Manzano). Ed. Global Rhythm Press. Barcelona, 2007.
- Tarántula Ed. Malpaso. 2017.
- Crónicas, Vol I., Ed. Global Rhythm Press, Barcelona, 2005.
- Crónicas, Vol I., Edición de bolsillo. Ed. RBA, Barcelona, 2007.
- Crónicas, Vol I., Ed. Malpaso, 2017.
- Canciones. Ed. Arquitrave. Canciones reúne medio centenar de textos de Bob Dylan traducidos por Gabriel Jiménez Emán.
- Letras 1962-2001; Ed. Alfaguara Global Rhythm, 2007.
- Fotorretórica de Hollywood. El Manuscrito perdido, Ed. Alfaguara Global Rhythm, 2009. Bob Dylan and Barry Feinstein.

== Books about Bob Dylan published in Spanish ==
- Dylan, historias, canciones y poesía Ed. Libros Cúpula, Barcelona, 2009. Dirigido por Mark Blake (Prólogo de Bono).
- Bob Dylan. El álbum 1956-1966 Ed. GlobalRhythm, Edición de Adrienne Wiley. Barcelona, 2005.
- Araguas, Vicente: El mundo poético de Bob Dylan, Ed. Pigmalión, 2017.
- Bauldie, John: Bob Dylan. Se busca, Celeste Ediciones, Madrid, 1994.
- Becerril Zúñiga, Pachi: Once upon a time... 365 días en la vida de Bob Dylan. Uno Editorial. 2017.
- Cott, Jonathan: Dylan sobre Dylan, Ed. Global Rhythm Press, Barcelona, 2008. Recopilación de entrevistas.
- Curado, Antonio: 20/20 Visión: apuntes sobre la obra de Bob Dylan, Ed. Covarrubias, Toledo, 2007.
- Escudero, Vicente: Bob Dylan, Editorial Lumen, Barcelona, junio de 1991.
- ——. Bob Dylan 4. Ediciones Júcar, colección "Los juglares", mayo de 1992.
- ——. Bob Dylan. Luces y sombras, Editorial La Máscara, abril de 1993.
- ——. Bob Dylan en la prensa española (1980-1993). Ed. Júcar, col. "Los Juglares", diciembre de 1995.
- ——. Bob Dylan. Los discos. Ed. Júcar, col. "Los juglares", abril de 1996.
- ——. Bob Dylan: Las canciones. Ed. Júcar, col. "Los juglares", abril de 1996.
- ——. Bob Dylan: Las palabras. Ed. Júcar, col. "Los juglares", abril de 1996.
- Faux, Danny: Bob Dylan 3, Ed. Júcar, col. “Los juglares”, julio de 1982.
- García, Francisco: Bob Dylan en España. Mapas de carretera para el alma; Editorial Milenio, diciembre de 2000.
- Jové, Josep Ramón: Bob Dylan disco a disco. 1961-1996. Canciones para después del diluvio, Ed. Milenio, Lleida, 1997.
- Izquierdo, Eduardo: Bob Dylan. La trilogía del tiempo y el amor. 66rpm Edicions. 2014.
- Ledesma Saúco, Javier: Bob Dylan, Dios y Jesucristo. ¿Una provocación?, Ed. C&G, 2014.ISBN 978-84-611-3401-4 - Páginas: 192 - Medidas:17x24 cm - Encuadernación: Rústica cosida a hilo.
- López Poy, Manuel: Bob Dylan, Ed. Ma Non Troppo, 2016.
- Manzano, Alberto: Bob Dylan, Salvat, col. Video Rock; Barcelona, 1991.
- Marcus, Greil: Like A Rolling Stone. Bob Dylan en la encrucijada, Ed. Global Rhythm Press. Barcelona, 2010.
- Margotin, Philippe y Guesdon, Jean-Michel: Bob Dylan. Todas sus canciones, Ed. Blume.2015.
- Martín, Luis: Bob Dylan, Ediciones Cátedra, col. Rock Pop; Madrid, 1991.
- Miles, Barry: Bob Dylan visto por sí mismo, Ed. Júcar; Madrid, 1984.
- Ordovás, Jesús: Bob Dylan 1, Ed. Júcar, col. “Los juglares”, octubre de 1972.
- Polizzotti, Mark: Highway 61 Revisited, Ed. Libros Crudos; Colección 33 1/3, 2010.
- Rato, Mariano Antolín: Bob Dylan 2, Ed. Júcar, col. “Los juglares”, septiembre de 1975.
- Rémond, Alain: Los caminos de Bob Dylan, Ediciones Sígueme, 1972. Editado inicialmente por Epi sa Editeurs, París, 1971.
- Ricks, Christopher: Dylan poeta: visiones del pecado, Editorial: Cuadernos de Langre / San Lorenzo de El Escorial, 2007.
- Santelli, Robert (comp.): Bob Dylan: el álbum. 1956-1966. Ed. Global Rhythm Press. 2005.
- Scaduto, Anthony: Bob Dylan, Ed. Júcar, col. "Los juglares serie especial”, primera edición, octubre de 1976 (segunda edición, mayo de 1983).
- Shepard, Sam: Rolling Thunder: Con Bob Dylan en la carretera. Ed. Anagrama. Barcelona, 2006.
- Sierra i Fabra, Jordi. Bob Dylan 1941-1979. Edicomunicación, 1979.
- ——; Bianciotto, Jordi. Bob Dylan. Ed. Folio S.A. Biografías ABC, 2005.
- ——. Bob Dylan 99 razones para amarlo (o no). Ed. Planeta, 2017.
- Sounes, Howard. Bob Dylan: La biografía. Ed. Sudamericana de Bolsillo, 2001.
- ——. Bob Dylan: La biografía. Edición ampliada. Ed. Reservoir Books, 2016.
- Southall, Brian: Los tesoros de Bob Dylan. Ed. Libros Cúpula, 2013.
- Vico Puertas, Darío: Bob Dylan. Ed. La Máscara SL, 2000.
- Williams, Paul. Bob Dylan. Años de juventud. Ed. Robinbook (ma non troppo). Barcelona, 2004.
- ——. Bob Dylan. Años de madurez. Ed. Robinbook (ma non troppo). Barcelona, 2005.
- ——. Bob Dylan. Años de luces y sombras. Ed. Robinbook (ma non troppo). Barcelona, 2005.
