= Visual art of Bob Dylan =

American singer-songwriter Bob Dylan's career has included public forays into the visual arts, namely in the fields of painting and sculpture.

== Painting ==
Dylan's visual art was first seen by the public via a painting he contributed for the cover of the Band's Music from Big Pink album in 1968. The cover of Dylan's own 1970 album Self Portrait features the painting of a human face by Dylan. More of Dylan's artwork was revealed with the 1973 publication of his book Writings and Drawings. The cover of Dylan's 1974 album Planet Waves again featured one of his paintings. In 1994, Random House published Drawn Blank, a book of Dylan's drawings. In 2007, the first public exhibition of Dylan's paintings, The Drawn Blank Series, opened at the Kunstsammlungen in Chemnitz, Germany; it showcased more than 200 watercolors and gouaches made from the original drawings. The exhibition coincided with the publication of Bob Dylan: The Drawn Blank Series, which includes 170 reproductions from the series. From September 2010 until April 2011, the National Gallery of Denmark exhibited 40 large-scale acrylic paintings by Dylan, The Brazil Series.

In July 2011, a leading contemporary art gallery, Gagosian Gallery, announced their representation of Dylan's paintings. An exhibition of Dylan's art, The Asia Series, opened at the Gagosian Madison Avenue Gallery on September 20, displaying Dylan's paintings of scenes in China and the Far East. The New York Times reported that "some fans and Dylanologists have raised questions about whether some of these paintings are based on the singer's own experiences and observations, or on photographs that are widely available and were not taken by Mr. Dylan". The Times pointed to close resemblances between Dylan's paintings and historic photos of Japan and China, and photos taken by Dmitri Kessel and Henri Cartier-Bresson. Art critic Blake Gopnik has defended Dylan's artistic practice, arguing: "Ever since the birth of photography, painters have used it as the basis for their works: Edgar Degas and Édouard Vuillard and other favorite artists—even Edvard Munch—all took or used photos as sources for their art, sometimes barely altering them". The Magnum photo agency confirmed that Dylan had licensed the reproduction rights of these photographs.

Dylan's second show at the Gagosian Gallery, Revisionist Art, opened in November 2012. The show consisted of thirty paintings, transforming and satirizing popular magazines including Playboy and Babytalk. In February 2013, Dylan exhibited the New Orleans Series of paintings at the Palazzo Reale in Milan. In August 2013, Britain's National Portrait Gallery, London hosted Dylan's first major UK exhibition, Face Value, featuring twelve pastel portraits.

In November 2016, the Halcyon Gallery featured a collection of artworks by Dylan. The exhibition, The Beaten Path, depicted American landscapes and urban scenes, inspired by Dylan's travels across the US. The show was reviewed by Vanity Fair and Asia Times Online. In October 2018, the Halcyon Gallery mounted an exhibition of Dylan's drawings, Mondo Scripto. The works consisted of Dylan hand-written lyrics of his songs, with each song illustrated by a drawing.

Retrospectrum, the largest retrospective of Dylan's visual art to date, consisting of over 250 works in various media, debuted at the Modern Art Museum in Shanghai in 2019. Building on the exhibition in China, a version of Retrospectrum, which includes a new series of paintings, "Deep Focus", drawn from film imagery, opened at the Frost Art Museum in Miami on November 30, 2021, while from December 16, 2022, to April 30, 2023, the MAXXI Museum in Rome hosted the retrospective which was the first European monographic exhibition dedicated to Dylan's visual art.

Since 1994, Dylan has published ten books of paintings and drawings. In November 2022, Dylan apologized for using an autopen to sign books and artwork which were subsequently sold as "hand-signed" since 2019.

== Sculpture ==
Bob Dylan has also been active as a sculptor, specialising in work with iron. He collects metal objects, including farm tools, antique firearms, gears, chains, and axes, and welds them together to create sculptural pieces. For thirty years, he crafted metal sculptures for family and friends before showcasing his work publicly in November 2013 with Mood Swings, an exhibition of seven wrought iron gates at London's Halcyon Gallery. In a statement released by the gallery, Dylan said:

I've been around iron all my life ever since I was a kid. I was born and raised in iron ore country, where you could breathe it and smell it every day. Gates appeal to me because of the negative space they allow. They can be closed but at the same time they allow the seasons and breezes to enter and flow. They can shut you out or shut you in. And in some ways there is no difference.

One of his most prominent installations in the United States is Portal, a monumental iron archway permanently displayed at the entrance of the MGM National Harbor resort in Maryland. In 2022, his first permanent sculpture installation in France, titled Rail Car, was inaugurated at Château Lacoste in Provence. This immersive work, made up of a wrought-iron freight car set on rails, evokes both industrial history and Dylan's personal history and was accompanied for a while by an exhibition of 24 paintings, Drawn Blank in Provence, his first painting exhibition in France.
