= Dashi Namdakov =

Russian sculptor

- Даши́нима Бальжимаевич Намдако́в
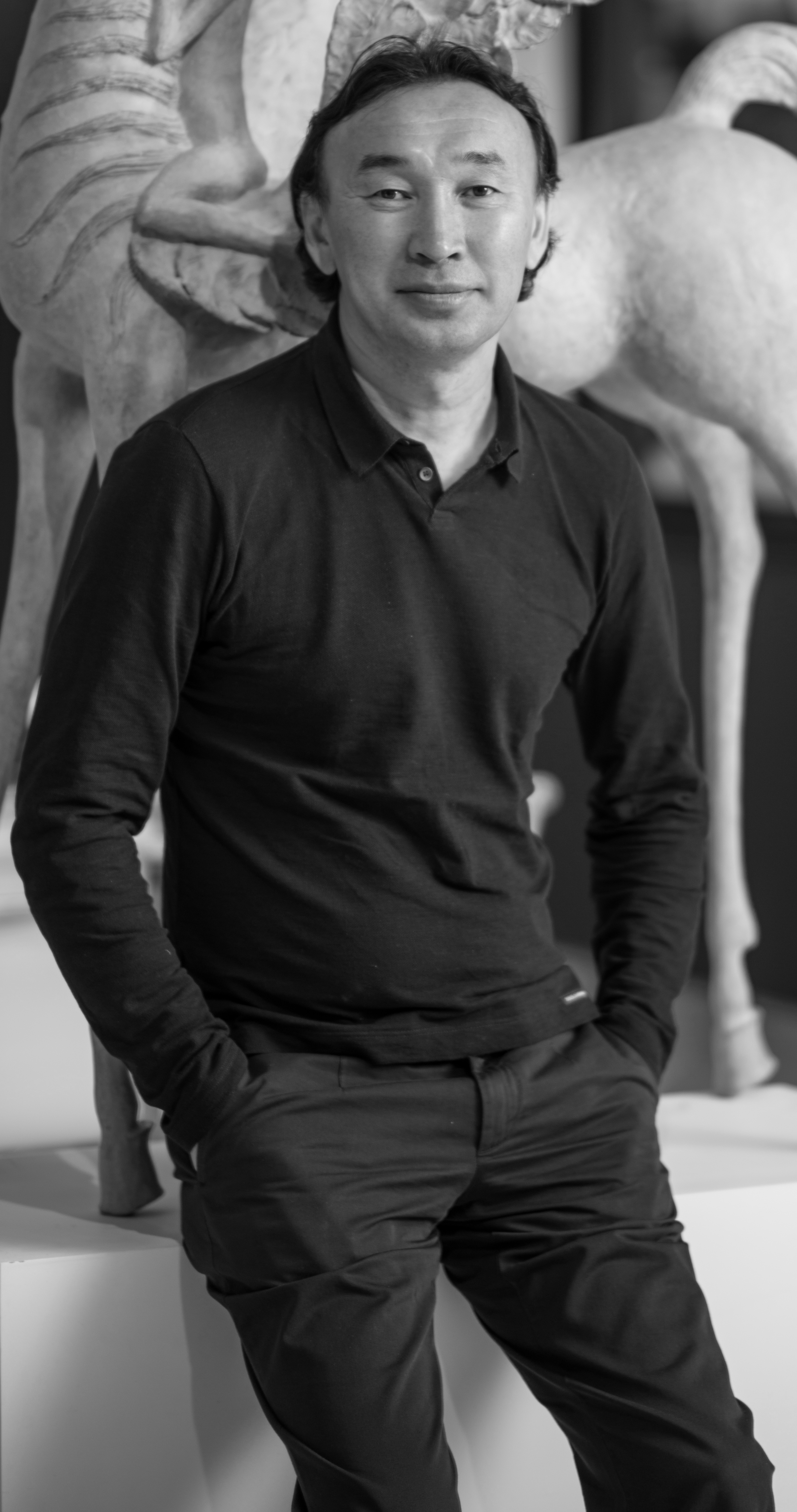
- Dashi Namdakov
- Born: Dashinima Balzhanovich Namdakov; 16 February 1967 (age 58); Ukurik, Chita Oblast, Russia
- Education: Krasnoyarsk, Irkutsk
- Known for: sculpture, graphics, jewellery
- Movement: Bronze Sculpture, Post-Modernism
- Website: http://www.dashi-art.com/

Dashinima (Dashi) Balzhanovich Namdakov (Russian: Даши́нима Бальжимаевич Намдако́в, Buryat: Намдагай Бальжамын Дашанима; born 16 February 1967) is a Russian sculptor and artist, member of the Russian Union of Artists.

== Biography ==
Dashi Namdakov was born in the Buryat village of Ukurik, Chita Oblast of Russia, on 16 February 1967. His full name is Dashinima ('Dashi Nima') which translates from Buryat as 'Lucky Sun'. He was sixth of 8 children of Balzhan and Buda-Khanda Namdakov.

Dashi's family have their roots in an ancient and respected clan of Darkhan blacksmiths. Only they were entrusted with working with fire - a sacred symbol of chosenness. Such families have always produced the best craftsmen - jewellers, masters and artists.

Dashi began his apprenticeship in the art studio of Gennady Vasiliev, a Buryat sculptor, in Ulan-Ude.

In 1988 Dashi started his studies at Krasnoyarsk State Institute of Fine Arts. Upon graduation in 1992, he returned to Ulan-Ude in order to continue working.

In the 1990s, Dashi Namdakov opened a small jewelry workshop in Ulan-Ude. He reminisces how all proceeds from that venture, combined with a salary contribution from his wife who worked at Sberbank at the time, were spent on bronze. 'Casting bronze is a complex technological process which cannot be performed on one's own and requires trained staff who need to be paid. We would have had more sculptors among us had the process been made easier to set up.'(2000)

In 2000, Dashi Namdakov had his first personal exhibition in Irkutsk Art Museum. The exhibition was a huge success with the public. Some years later he was invited to put on an exhibition in Moscow. As part of a group exhibition at the Central House of Artists, Dashi presented his works among other young Russian sculptors. Soon the public began to talk about Namdakov's art in the Russian capital. Thus started real nomadic life for the artist - he moved to Moscow in 2004.

Since 2000, the Buryat artist has held dozens of exhibitions around the world, from Tokyo and Beijing to New York and Los Angeles. Dashi has exhibited his work in musea - the State Hermitage Museum (St. Petersburg, Russia), the Beijing World Art Museum (PRC), in galleries – the Halcyon Gallery (London, UK) , the National Arts Club (USA), and has been involved in government-commissioned projects.

Namdakov's artworks are kept in the vaults of the State Hermitage, the Russian Ethnographic Museum in St.Petersburg, the Museum of Oriental Art, and in other musea around the world. Among the renowned private collectors of works by Dashi are prominent figures from the worlds of politics and business, as well as private collectors from Germany, France, Belgium, Switzerland, Finland, Japan, the USA, Taiwan, and, of course, Russia. Cultural institutions of 25 countries are proud to own artworks by Namdakov in their funds.

== Notable works ==
She-Guardian, London 2015

In April 2012, City of Westminster installed Dashi Namdakov's bronze sculpture of Genghis Khan at Cumberland Gate, Marble Arch.

On May 11, 2015 another statue by Namdakov, She-Guardian (bronze, 11m high) was installed on the same spot.
