= She-Guardian =

Sculpture by Dashi Namdakov

Coordinates: 51.5128°N 0.1601°W

She Guardian
- Artist: Dashi Namdakov
- Year: 2012
- Type: patinated bronze

She-Guardian is a landscape sculpture by Russian sculptor Dashi Namdakov. It depicts a mythical winged creature standing guard over her young. The statue is 11 metres (36 ft) high to the tip of the wings.

In May 2015, the monument was installed in the "City of Sculpture" temporary art space next to Cumberland Gate at London's Marble Arch. This was arranged by the Halcyon Gallery, with approval and consent of the Westminster Council. It remained there until 2016.

Some people say the sculpture exhibits an aggressive posture but Namdakov said: "I've never seen any threat in its open mouth. I recognized it as defence of the youth and protection of the family."

== Production ==
The idea for the work came to Dashi from a lynx skull, given to him by Siberian hunters. The statue was realised by an Italian famous foundry based in Pietrasanta: Fonderia d'arte Massimo del Chiaro.
