= Robert Polito =

American writer and arts administrator

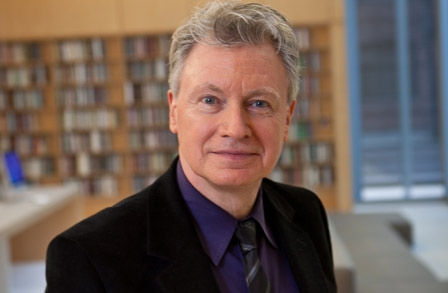
Robert Polito

Robert Polito is a poet, biographer, essayist, critic, educator, curator, and arts administrator. He received the National Book Critics Circle Award in biography in 1995 for Savage Art: A Biography of Jim Thompson. The founding director of the New School Graduate Writing Program in New York City, he was President of the Poetry Foundation from 2013 to 2015, before returning to the New School as a professor of writing. In 2019, in collaboration with Michael Almereyda and Jonathan Lethem, Polito published Manny Farber: Paintings & Writings (Hat & Beard Press). In 2026 he published After the Flood: Inside Bob Dylan’s Memory Palace (Liveright), and Jim Thompson: Noir Novels of the 1950s & 1960s (Library of America).

== Early life and education ==
Polito was born in Boston, Massachusetts on October 27, 1951. His father was the Supervisor of the Post Office in the historic South Station railroad station. Polito attended Boston College High School and Boston College, where he was Features Editor of the college newspaper, The Heights. He edited and designed the official Boston College literary journal, Stylus, as well as the alternative campus magazine, Wingwing. Columnist George Frazier, reviewing one of Polito's Stylus issues in the Boston Globe, wrote, "I happen to think it may well be the most sophisticated and subtle undergraduate literary magazine I have ever seen." He received his MA and Ph.D. in English and American Literature and Language from Harvard in 1981, with concentrations in the English Renaissance, Latin poetry, romantic poetry, and modern poetry and fiction. His thesis, At the Titan's Breakfast: Three Essays on Byron's Poetry, was published in 1987 in the Garland-Routledge series, Harvard Dissertations in English and American Literature.

From 1983 to 1988 he wrote about literature and popular music for The Boston Phoenix, including articles about Elizabeth Bishop, Elvis Costello, Lou Reed, Jim Thompson, and the Turbines.

Polito taught at Harvard, Wellesley College, and New York University, before joining the faculty of the New School in 1992. He was the Holloway Visiting Poet at the University of California, Berkeley, in 1999.

He is married to Kristine Harris, associate professor of Chinese History, Asian Studies, and film at SUNY, New Paltz.

== Career ==
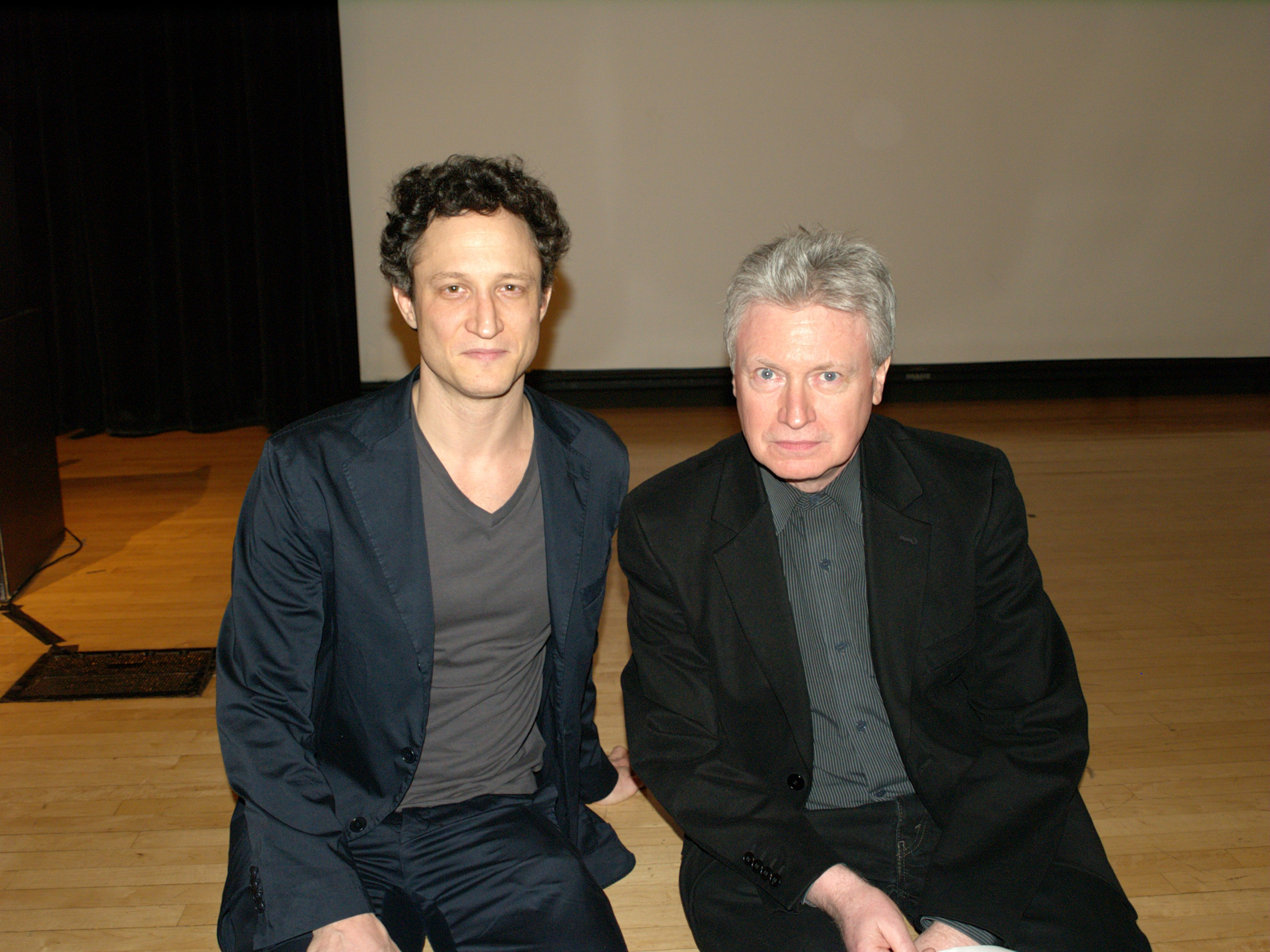
Novelist John Reed and Polito at the National Book Critics Circle awards in 2012

=== Collections ===
Polito is the author of two books of poetry, Doubles (1995), and Hollywood & God (2009). Barnes and Noble identified Hollywood & God as one of the top five poetry books of the year, remarking that "this collection is shattered, mythic, and dazzling." His poetry blends narrative and lyric impulses, drawing on both American pop culture and literary tradition. In an interview with The Literary Review, Polito said that Hollywood & God

'Tracks a continuum between what might be regarded as transcendence and what we call celebrity culture ... I was interested in telling other people's stories in what looks like my voice and my stories in what looks like other people's voices. I think the shifts of identity in Hollywood & God—the moments where suddenly the narrative voice of a poem gives way to another character—are one of the root elements of the book. Recurrently, I was aiming for a collective or composite voice, and there's inevitably a lot of collage.'

Savage Art (1995), Polito's biography of American noir novelist Jim Thompson, received the National Book Critics Circle Award in Biography and an Edgar Award from the Mystery Writers of America.

His critical writing includes A Reader's Guide to James Merrill's The Changing Light at Sandover (1995) and At the Titan's Breakfast: Three Essays on Byron's Poetry (1987), as well as many essays, articles, and reviews in publications such as the New York Times Book Review, Harpers, Bookforum, Los Angeles Review of Books, Black Clock, AGNI, Paste, The Gettysburg Review, PEN America, BOMB, LIT, Mississippi Review, Open City, Boston Globe, Artforum, Village Voice, Verse, Pequod, The Boston Phoenix, The Boston Review, and the Poetry Foundation. From 2004 to 2006 Polito wrote a column for Bookforum, "Shoot the Piano Player," where he covered noir in literature, film, and visual art. In 2026, Polito released a major study of Bob Dylan's later career, After The Flood (Liveright).

Polito's work has been selected for Best American Poetry (1992), Best American Essays (2006), and Best American Movie Writing (2001). He has contributed essays to numerous catalogs and anthologies, including Patricia Patterson: Here and There, Back and Forth (2012), The New Literary History of America (2009), Bob Dylan's American Journey (2009); The Cambridge Companion to Bob Dylan (2009); The Show I'll Never Forget (2007); Poem that Changed America: HOWL Fifty Years Later (2006); Studio A: The Bob Dylan Reader (2004); This Is Pop: In Search of the Elusive at Experience Music Project (2004); Manny Farber: About Face (2003); and BOMB: Speak Fiction and Poetry (1998).

Books he has edited include David Goodis: Five Noir Novels of the 1940s and 1950s (2012); Farber on Film: The Complete Film Writings of Manny Farber (2009); Kenneth Fearing: Selected Poems (2004); The Everyman James M. Cain (2003); The Everyman Dashiell Hammett (2002); Crime Novels: American Noir of the 1930s and 1940s (1996); Crime Novels: American Noir of the 1950s (1996); and, as coeditor, Fireworks: The Lost Writing of Jim Thompson (1988).

His writing about film has accompanied many Criterion Collection DVDs, among them Stephen Frears’s The Grifters (2025), Edgar Ulmer’s Detour (2019), Michael Curtis’s Mildred Pierce (2017), D. A. Pennebaker's Dont Look Back (2015) The Complete Jean Vigo (2011), Samuel Fuller's Shock Corridor (2011) and The Naked Kiss (2011), Robert Bresson's Mouchette (2007), and Orson Welles's The Complete Mr. Arkadin (2006). He wrote the liner notes for The Big Gundown: John Zorn Plays the Music of Ennio Morricone (1986).

The recipient of fellowships from the Guggenheim Foundation and the Ingram Merrill Foundation, he received the Arts Council Alumni Award from Boston College in 2013, for his career as a poet, writer, educator, and arts administrator. He has lectured and given readings widely across America, and also in France, Italy, England, and China.

=== The New School ===
After serving as assistant director of the Graduate Writing Program at the New York University, Polito became the director of the Writing Program and chair of the Humanities Department at the New School in 1992. He founded the Graduate Program in Creative Writing at the New School in 1996, with concentrations in poetry, fiction, nonfiction, and writing for children/young adults. He directed the Graduate Writing Program and taught poetry and nonfiction writing workshops and literature seminars from 1996 until 2013, when he moved to Chicago to serve as President of the Poetry Foundation.

Polito identified the distinctive characteristics of the New School Graduate Writing program as including "the finest and most various group of faculty writers in the country" and a public reading series of nearly fifty events each semester, sometimes on-sponsored with other New York literary organizations, such as the Academy of American Poets, the National Book Foundation, PEN America Center, Cave Canem, and the Poetry Society of America. He described the reading series as "honoring the 'public intellectual' traditions of the New School" and as a "community resource for writers and readers across the city."

In 2006, Polito created the Riggio Writing & Democracy Honors Program at the New School. Named for Len and Louise Riggio, funders of the program, Writing & Democracy is a "progressive undergraduate program of writing workshops and close reading seminars that operates along the seams of Orwell's 'special connection' between writing and democracy." The program "seeks to merge study and practice, the aesthetic and political" and "is rooted in a supposition that we live inside a culture that assumes as citizens we don't pay close attention to much of anything, assumes—in fact—we don't know how." Alongside traditional and contemporary literature and culture, Polito saw the Internet as "axial to the Writing & Democracy Program, for both everyday practice and overall design. ... as a result of the omnipresence of the Internet the ordinary experience of the ordinary global citizen more and more resembles life inside a Modernist novel or poem—from Melville and Dickinson to Joyce, Stein, Eliot, Beckett, and Pound. The once radical innovations of Modernist literature—unreliable narrators, multiple voices, fragmentation, collage, ricocheting allusions, and instabilities of language and identity—now are the routine givens of our daily online life, whether at home or the office, our public or private selves." Riggio faculty included Greil Marcus, Lynne Tillman, Elizabeth Gaffney, Catherine Barnett, John Reed, Sam Tanenhaus, and René Steinke, who also served as faculty advisor to the program's magazine,12th Street.

At the New School, Polito also founded ASHLAB, a digital mapping of poet John Ashbery's Hudson, New York house in light of his written work. Polito team-taught an ASHLAB graduate seminar with digital designer Irwin Chen and poets Tom Healy and Adam Fitzgerald.

=== The Poetry Foundation ===
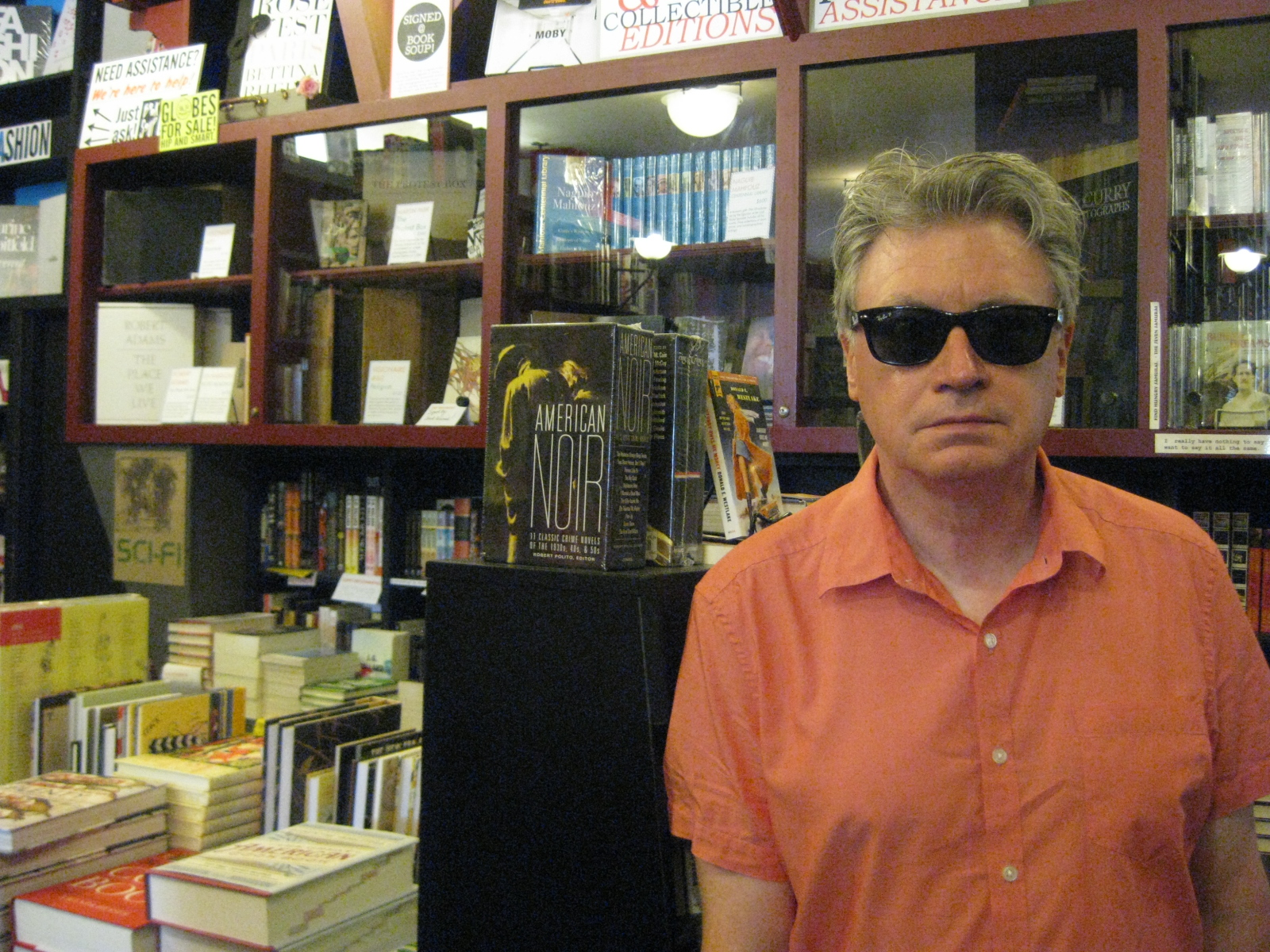

In January 2013, it was announced that Polito was selected as the second president of the Poetry Foundation, succeeding John Barr. Soon after the announcement, Meghan O'Rourke reported that

Critics argue that the [Poetry] foundation, led by an investment banker and poet named John Barr, hasn't spent its money wisely or aggressively enough. Among its most visible projects to date are a Web site that draws some 12 million unique visitors a year; a high-school recitation program; a redesign for Poetry magazine; and, most contentiously, an eyebrow-raising $21.5 million headquarters in Chicago. Barr is leaving the Poetry Foundation in July and will be replaced by the respected poet and critic Robert Polito, who currently directs the writing program at the New School; his appointment may be a sign that the foundation has heard its critics' voices.

Polito envisioned the Poetry Foundation as "simultaneously a Chicago, national, and international organization." He embraced the Modernist legacy of "innovation, experiment, and discovery that originated over a hundred years ago when Harriet Monroe founded Poetry magazine." He created poet exchanges with other countries, including France and Italy, and worked closely with other poetry and arts organizations in Chicago and across America. Polito introduced the Ruth Lilly and Dorothy Sargent Rosenberg Poetry Fellows at the 2014 Miami Book Fair. In February, 2015, he presented a prototype of the Poetry Foundation's enhanced digital poetry books project at the Ritratti di Poesia in Rome.

Polito observed that "We live at a lucky moment for poetry, when there are so many surprising poets across generations, cultures and styles–and this situation is one of the powerful legacies of Poetry [magazine]." He appointed Don Share as the new editor of Poetry, and Cassie Mayer as the new Director of Digital Programs.

At the Poetry Foundation, Polito emphasized literary education as a path to lifelong reading of poetry, initiating partnerships with Young Chicago Authors for their Teaching Artists Cultivation Program and the ElevArte After-School Poetry Program. With poet and former Poet Laureate Robert Pinsky, he developed the Summer Poetry Teachers Institute, the Favorite Poem Project: Chicago, and the Favorite Poem Project: Florida. In April 2014, he convened a Youth Poetry Assembly at the Poetry Foundation, bringing together for the first time the National Student Poets, various student poetry slam champions, and finalists from the Poetry Out Loud annual recitation contest as young "Poetry Ambassadors." Polito inaugurated a reading series, The Open Door, that featured faculty and students from Chicago's graduate and undergraduate writing programs. In June, 2015 he announced the appointment of Jacqueline Woodson as the Poetry Foundation's Young People's Poet Laureate.

Polito instituted the Pegasus Award for Criticism, honoring the best book-length poetry criticism published during the previous year. In 2014 Mark Ford received the Pegasus Award, and in 2013 the recipient was the University of California Press for the Collected Writings of Robert Duncan. During Polito's tenure at the Poetry Foundation, Nathaniel Mackey (2013) and Alice Notley (2014) were awarded the prestigious Ruth Lilly Poetry Prize.

He hosted PoetryNow, a radio program that showcased readings and discussion by established and emerging poets and was broadcast nationally across the WFMT Radio Network. Through the Harriet Monroe Poetry Institute, Polito committed the Poetry Foundation to an ambitious new media agenda: a publication series of enhanced digital editions of iconic books of twentieth-century poetry; a digital anthology, "What Are Years"; and digital documentation of John Ashbery's Hudson, New York house against the backdrop of his career as a poet and art critic. During Polito's presidency, traffic at the Poetry Foundation website increased to over 30 million unique visitors annually.

In an interview, Polito reflected on his activities at the Poetry Foundation:

All my work at the Poetry Foundation was rooted in a vision of the transformative power of poetry, whether in an individual life or a culture.

I also tried to shift the public discussion a bit about poetry. Readers and writers of poems know that the personal enrichment of a life through poetry is matched by the public and professional skills close attention to language provides. Such habits of attentiveness and critical reflection turn out to be endlessly re-applicable. If one can read a poem, one can "read" a film, painting, song, photograph, or building, by knowing the questions useful for approaching works of art.

These skills also prove constructive training for almost any career, including law, business, government, and media. They are indispensable to citizenship, allowing us to listen to a political speech or negotiate 24/7 news cycles as alert, prepared, analytical citizens. ... Few really talk about poetry this way, but it is devastatingly important. Poetry matters.

In June 2015 Polito was listed as the second most notable and appreciated literary Chicagoan, in the New City magazine's annual "Lit 50 List: Who Really Books in Chicago".

He left the Poetry Foundation in the summer of 2015, at the conclusion of his contract, and returned to the New School, where he had retained tenure.

=== The Graywolf Nonfiction Prize ===
From 2006 to 2012 Polito judged the Graywolf Press Nonfiction Prize. He chose seven books for publication by Graywolf: Frantic Transmissions to and from Los Angeles: An Accidental Memoir, by Kate Braverman; Neck Deep and Other Predicaments, by Ander Monson; Black Glasses Like Clark Kent, by Terese Svoboda; Notes from No Man's Land, by Eula Biss; The Gray Album: On the Blackness of Blackness, by Kevin Young; The Empathy Exams, by Leslie Jamison; Leaving Orbit: Notes from the Last Days of American Space Flight, by Margaret Lazarus Dean.

In a "Judge's Statement" published in Braverman's book, Polito proposed that "nonfiction must be as daring and innovative as our strongest poems and novels."
