= Cinimod Studio =

London-based design studio

Cinimod Studio Limited
- Official Cinimod Studio logo 2008-2015
- Industry: Architecture, Art Production, Lighting Design, Special Events
- Founded: August 2007
- Founder: Dominic Harris
- Headquarters: London, England
- Key people: Dominic Harris; Kristian Gilroy; Dougal Drummond
- Website: www.cinimodstudio.com

Cinimod Studio is a London-based experiential agency involved in various architecture and lighting design projects. Projects undertaken typically involve a wide mix of media and technologies, and often involve interactive design.

== Beginnings ==
In 2007 architect Dominic Harris founded Cinimod Studio. He had trained at the Bartlett School of Architecture and worked for many years with architecture firms Future Systems and Softroom, and for the interactive design firm Jason Bruges Studio.

== The Studio ==
Cinimod Studio operates from a Notting Hill studio. In October 2008, director Dominic Harris was the recipient of the "Breakthrough Talent of the Year" at the FX International Interior Design Awards 2008. In November 2009, Cinimod Studio was awarded "Best Bar or Restaurant" at the FX International Design Awards 2009. In 2010 the studio won further recognition at the Lighting Design Awards 2010, winning "Best Hotel or Restaurant" lighting scheme. In 2012 Cinimod Studio won 2 awards at the Lighting Design Awards 2012 with first prize in the "Small Retail Projects" and "Special Projects" category. In March, 2014, Cinimod Studio won "Best Luminaire" at the Lighting Design Awards 2014 with their Moon Chandelier, and in the Lighting Design Awards 2015 Cinimod Studio won the "Special Projects" category for the "Emergence" sculpture at Heathrow Terminal 2. The studio consists of a multi-disciplinary team of designers that includes architects, product designers, lighting designers and software engineers.

== Notable projects ==
=== Ralph Lauren - 50th Anniversary Celebration Immersive Experience ===
An immersive and cinematic experience in Central Park to celebrate Ralph Lauren's 50th Anniversary. The installation, designed by Cinimod Studio's specialist in house hologram team, Cinimod Holograms, featured a mirrored structure which housed Cinimod's new technique, multiplane holograms.

=== Ralph Lauren - Hologram at GQ Men of the Year 2018 Awards ===
Cinimod Holograms, created a holographic installation of Ralph Lauren accepting his award for "Design Legend" at the GQ Men of the Year Awards 2018, presented by actor James Norton.

=== Ralph Lauren - Holographic Window Display ===
For the launch of Ralph Lauren's Polo Tech Shirt, Cinimod Studio delivered a holographic window display in the New York flagship store.

=== PHOS ART + DESIGN ===
Cinimod Studio designed PHOS ART + DESIGN which is a multidisciplinary gallery in Mayfair.

=== London Eye Facebook Election Mapping ===
In the countdown to the 2015 United Kingdom general election, Facebook presented their election data onto the London Eye in the design of a colourful light pie chart produced by Bompas & Parr and programmed by Cinimod Studio. Each night at 21:30 a different light show was displayed with a colour representing each parties level of discussion from the 52 million interactions observed online.

=== A Concentric Study ===
For Art Paris 2015, Cinimod Studio were commissioned to project their artwork, A Concentric Study. The interplay between the projected patterns created a playful yet dynamic tension to the underlying architecture and the historical gravitas of the surrounding area.

=== Spirit of Ecstasy - Inside Rolls-Royce ===
Presented in the Saatchi Gallery for the Inside Rolls-Royce exhibition, Cinimod Studio delivered an interactive form of the Spirit of Ecstasy. The public were able to transform themselves into the brand's icon through a light particle animation and video wall.

=== Snog Bus ===
Situated on the South Bank, London, Cinimod Studio transformed an AEC Routemaster Bus, that is part of the Southbank Centre's Festival of Love.

=== Caviar House and Prunier "Emergence" ===
The “Emergence” lighting sculpture for Caviar House and Prunier is in the middle of the new Heathrow Terminal 2’s International Departures Lounge. Cinimod Studio delivered a landmark for the new terminal building. In March 2015, Emergence won "Special Projects" at the Lighting Design Awards.

=== Wondertree Restaurants "Wondertree" ===
Cinimod Studio created a pair of illuminated tree sculptures for the Wondertree restaurant located on the mezzanine level of Heathrow Terminal 2. The trees are made from polycarbonate and aluminium, and LED lighting has been used to dynamically change their colour appearance to suit the different seasons of the year. The restaurant is operated by The Restaurant Group.

=== SNOG Pure Frozen Yogurt ===
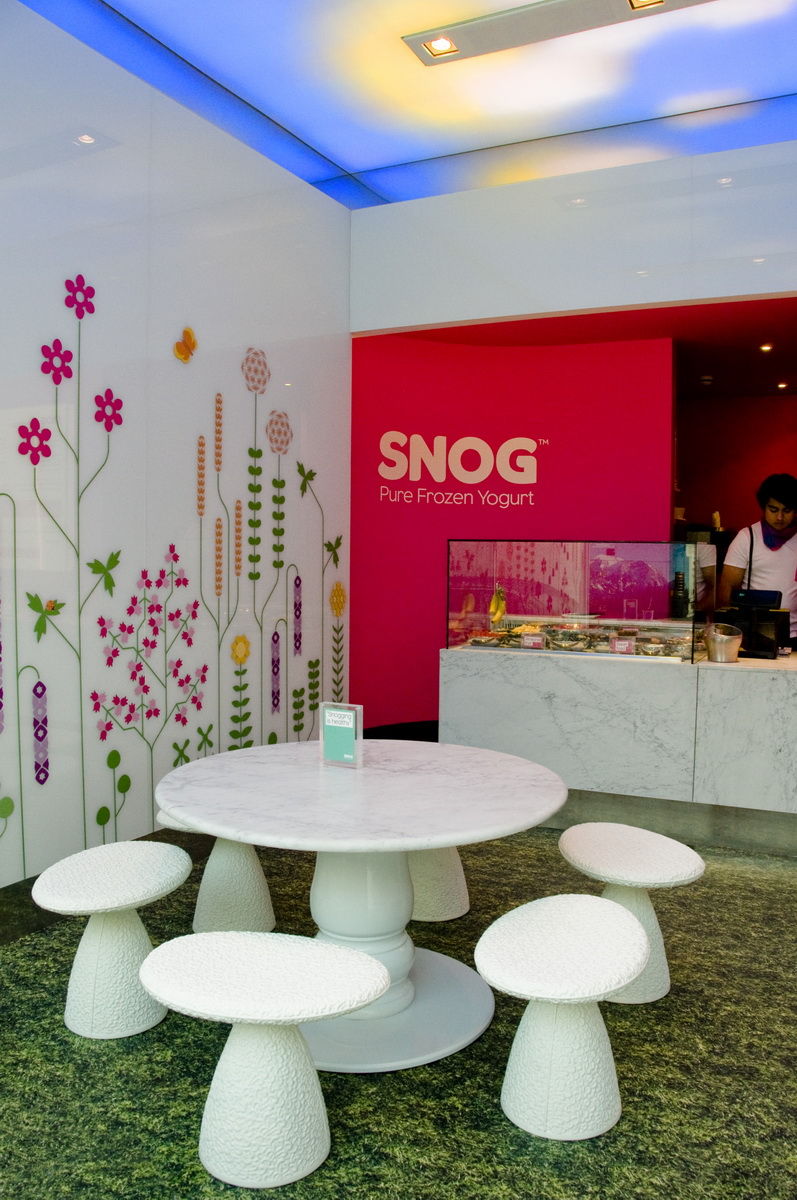
Interior view of the first SNOG Pure Frozen Yogurt store in London

Cinimod Studio is responsible for the architecture and lighting design for the British company, SNOG Pure Frozen Yogurt. The first store in South Kensington integrates a digital sky feature element made up of over 3,000 LEDs behind a stretched plast ceiling. Displayed on the LED sky are digital clouds, "their colour and speed determined by the time of day." The second store in Soho instead features a ceiling lighting installation consisting of 700 globes of individually colour-changing light. The third location, again designed by Cinimod Studio, is a kiosk at the Westfield Shopping Centre in Shepherd's Bush, London. A fourth location, by Cinimod Studio, has opened in Covent Garden, London. A fifth location opened in King's Road, Chelsea, in December 2010. The studio has also been responsible for the international locations, including those in Brazil, Columbia, Dubai, Kuwait and Pakistan.

=== UFO Project (Peter Coffin) ===
"Untitled (UFO)" is an art project conceived by established New York artist Peter Coffin. Cinimod Studio was hired to realise the project, and produced an innovative structural, technical and electrical design and oversaw the fabrication and assembly. The UFO was publicly shown for the first time at the "Festival Of Stars" in Gdańsk, Poland, on 4 July 2008. The object measured 7 metres in diameter and was manufactured of aluminum with 3000 bright and individually controllable Color Kinetics LED nodes arrayed across the structure, controlled via solid state computer. The system was powered by an on-board 6 kW generator and the craft was remotely controlled via SMS messaging. The craft weighed 600 kg, and was controlled during its unveiling flight from a Mi2 helicopter piloted by mountain rescue pilots.

=== Hoxton Square Exploded Globe ===
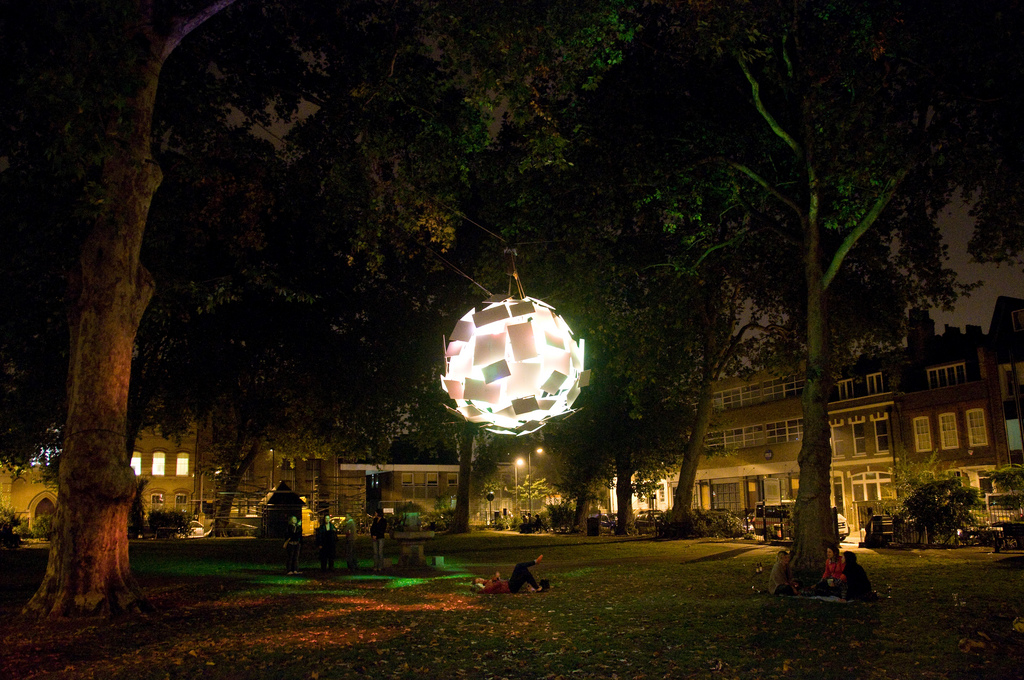
Hoxton Square Exploded Globe light art installation

To celebrate the launch of the new Restaurant and Bar Design Awards, Cinimod Studio was commissioned to create an outdoor interactive lighting installation suspended within the tree canopy over London's Hoxton Square.

=== Beacon Interactive Art Installation ===
In January 2009 Cinimod Studio collaborated with artist and designer Chris O'Shea to create an interactive lighting artwork made of modified police beacon lights that responded in realtime to the movement of visitors to the installation space. The artwork was first exhibited in the Science Gallery in Dublin, Ireland, and then in the Kinetica Art Fair in London, England.

=== Itsu "Butterfly In Flight" ===
Cinimod Studio are responsible for the new "Butterfly in Flight" lighting features that are now appearing in Itsu sushi restaurants across London, UK. These lighting features consist of sculptured forms of edge-lit acrylic through which computer controlled sequences of coloured LED lights are sequenced, creating the dynamic effect of a butterfly fluttering through the artwork.

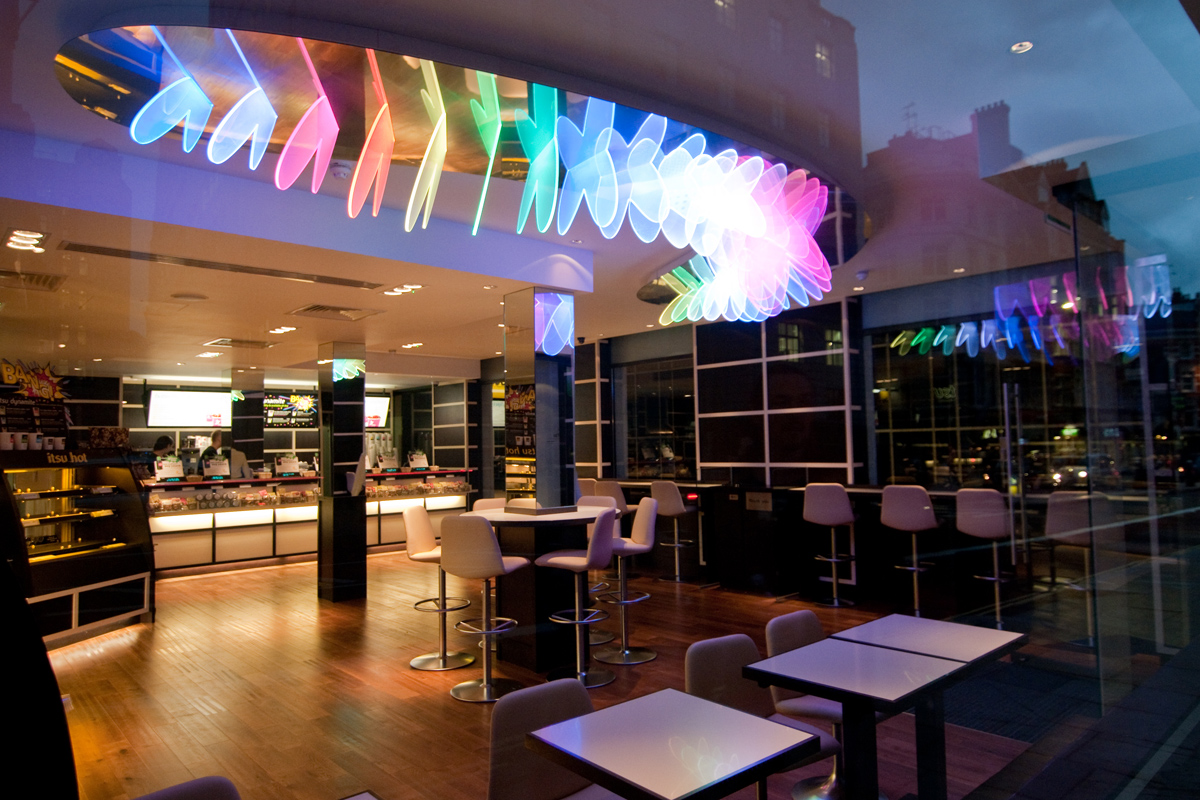
Butterfly in Flight at Itsu Restaurant, Cannon Street, London

=== Flutter ===
"Flutter" is an interactive artwork by Dominic Harris, the founder and director of Cinimod Studio, that was first exhibited at the Kinetica Art Fair 2010. It is the detailed study of the movement of a butterfly as if displayed on an unwrapped zoetrope.

=== DJ Light ===
DJ Light was a large scale Son et lumière project created by Cinimod Studio for Endessa in Lima, Peru, for Christmas 2010. It consisted of 85 inflatable globes of light that were individually controllable in both color and lighting intensity. The installation was operated by invited members of the public who would stand on the designated podium. A thermal camera tracked their arm and body movements and via software written in Max Msp software the interactive light and sounds controls were made.

=== Peru National Football Stadium ===
Cinimod Studio were commissioned to create an interactive lighting control system for the new facade lighting that was part of the 2011 refurbishment program of the Estadio Nacional (Lima), Peru's National Football Stadium. Their design consisted of a sound level monitoring system that was analysed in real-time to determine the mood of the crowd. This analysis was in turn output as lighting patterns across the stadium facade. The system was inaugurated in July 2011 and remains a permanent part of the stadium.

=== London Eye Mood Conductor ===
Cinimod Studio created an interactive lighting control system for the London Eye attraction on the London Southbank. A gestural control system and a heart rate monitor let visitors control the lighting across the London Eye in an interactive way. The installation ran through the London 2012 Olympic period.

=== Walk The Light ===
For the 2012 London Design Festival the studio created an interactive lighting installation at the tunnel entrance to the Victoria & Albert Museum. The installation consisted of a physically moving beam of white light that tracked visitors via thermal camera sensors.

=== Hologram for Pink Floyd ===
A holographic reinterpretation of the rainbow-emitting prism from The Dark Side of the Moon, created by Cinimod Holograms.
