= Dominic Harris =

British artist (born 1976)

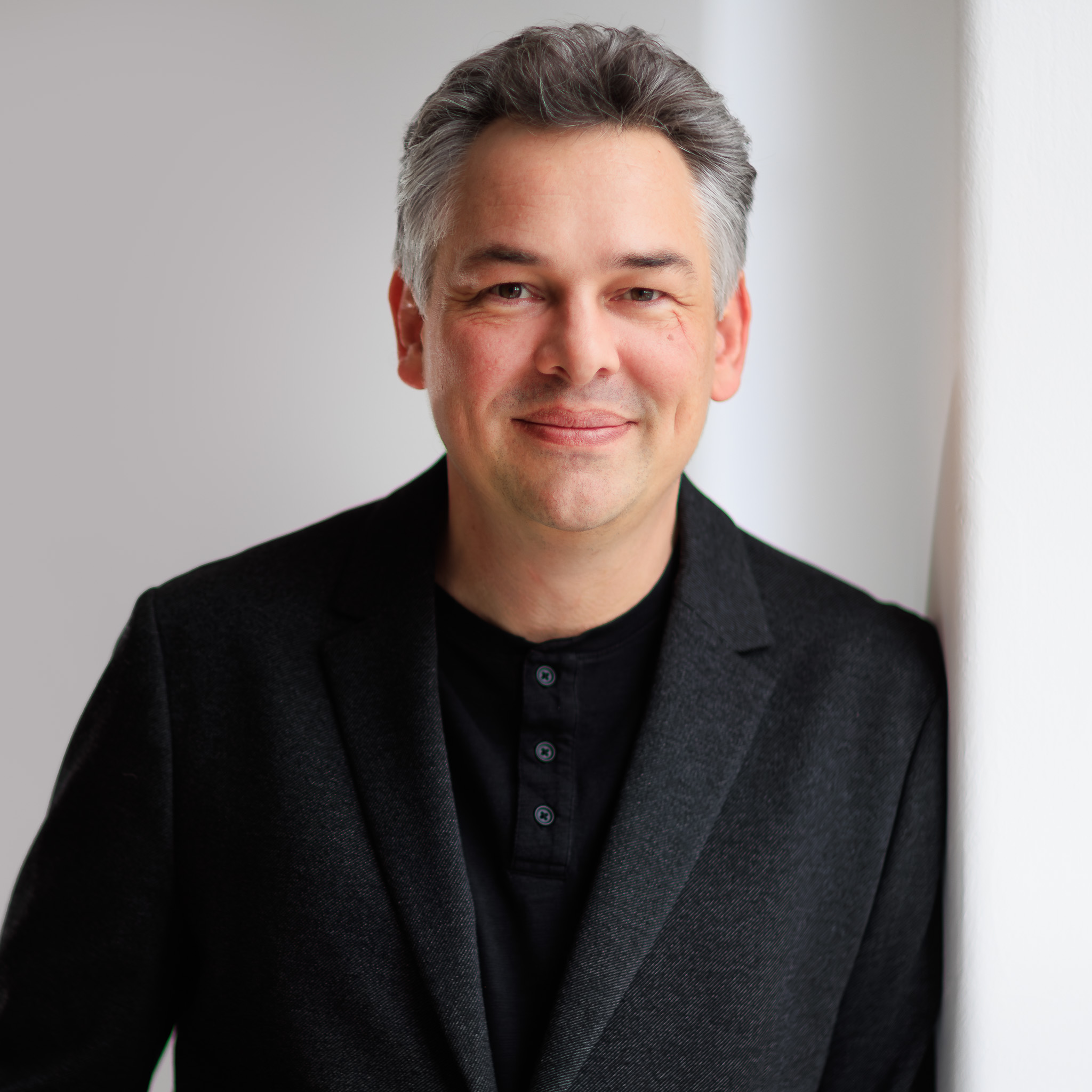
- Harris in 2023
- Born: 16 November 1976 (age 49); London
- Education: The Bartlett, Architect
- Known for: Multimedia art, interactive art
- Notable work: Disney Artworks, World Stage
- Movement: Digital art, computer art
- Website: https://www.dominicharris.com

Dominic Harris (born 16 November 1976) is a British artist known for integrating modern technology and classical design in his interactive artworks.

== Background ==
Dominic Harris was born in London on 16 November 1976, and grew up in London, Brussels, and Michigan before returning to London in 1995. Harris attended the Cranbrook Kingswood Upper School, and then trained as an architect at the Bartlett School of Architecture, and has been ARB registered since 2011.

Harris designs and fabricates his artworks at Dominic Harris Studio, a multi-disciplinary practice he founded in 2007. This studio consists of 25 people with diverse backgrounds including architecture, product design, electronics, programming, graphic design, and workshop skills.

Harris uses the resources of his studio for the ongoing development, prototyping and production of his artworks. Harris also oversees the studio's international projects where his fascinations are translated into larger scale projects that span residential, retail, and public art projects. In 2015, Harris was granted permission by the Walt Disney Company to use their Intellectual Property for the purpose of making new interactive artworks. Harris is the only artist to gain permission to use Disney's back catalogue of characters, and led him to creating his interactive versions of "Snow White and the Seven Dwarfs" and "Mickey and Minnie: An Interactive Diptych".

Harris is fascinated by the idea of using data streams, algorithms, and computer code to generate dynamic and ever-changing artworks. He sees data as a raw material that can be transformed into visual poetry. Many of his installations and sculptures are interactive, responding to the presence and movement of viewers/participants. This creates an immersive experience where the observer becomes part of the artwork itself.

Harris is also the founding partner of a sister studio in London called Cinimod Studio that creates large commissioned installations, interactive events and lighting designs for large brands.

== Works ==
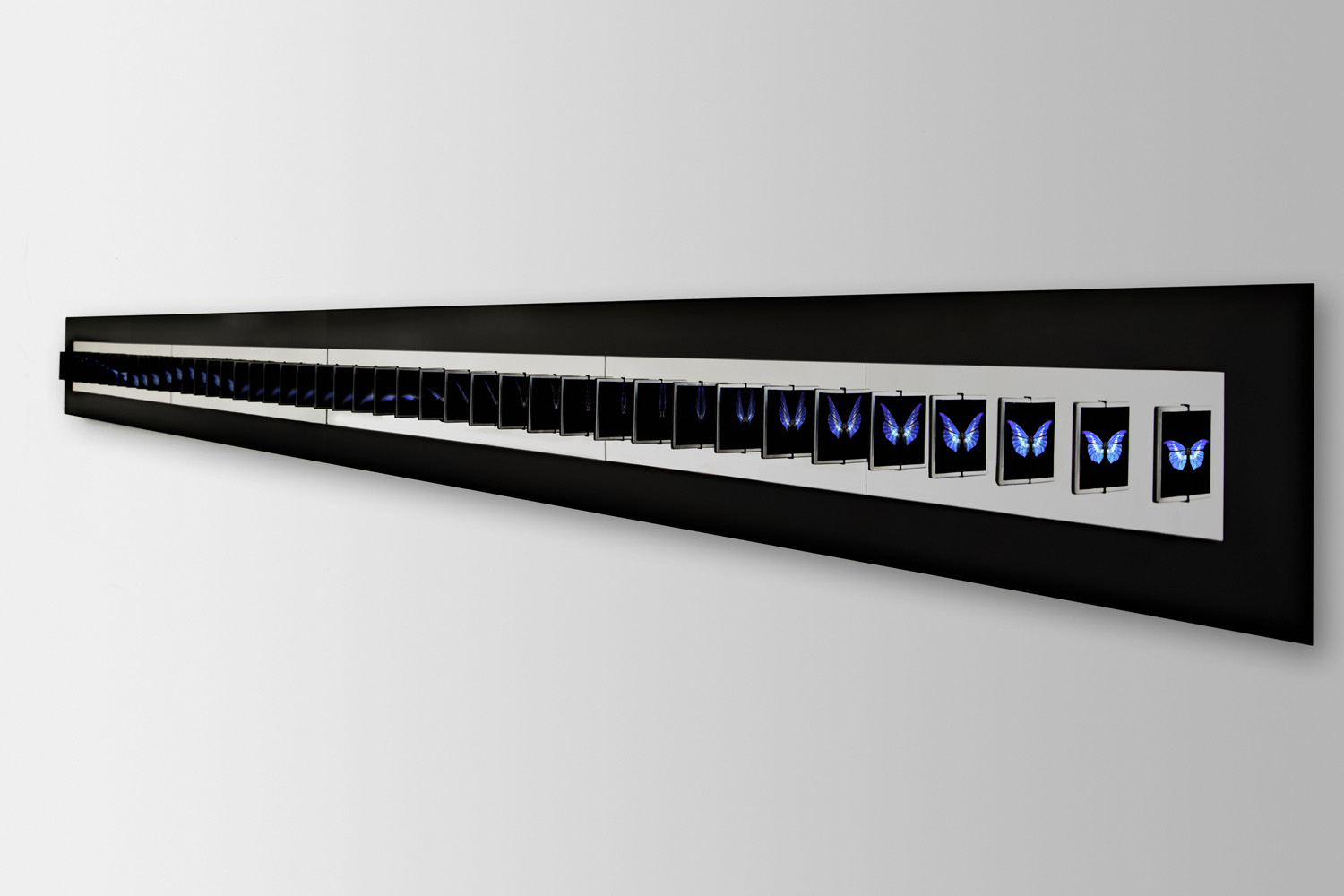
Flutter (2011) artwork by Dominic Harris

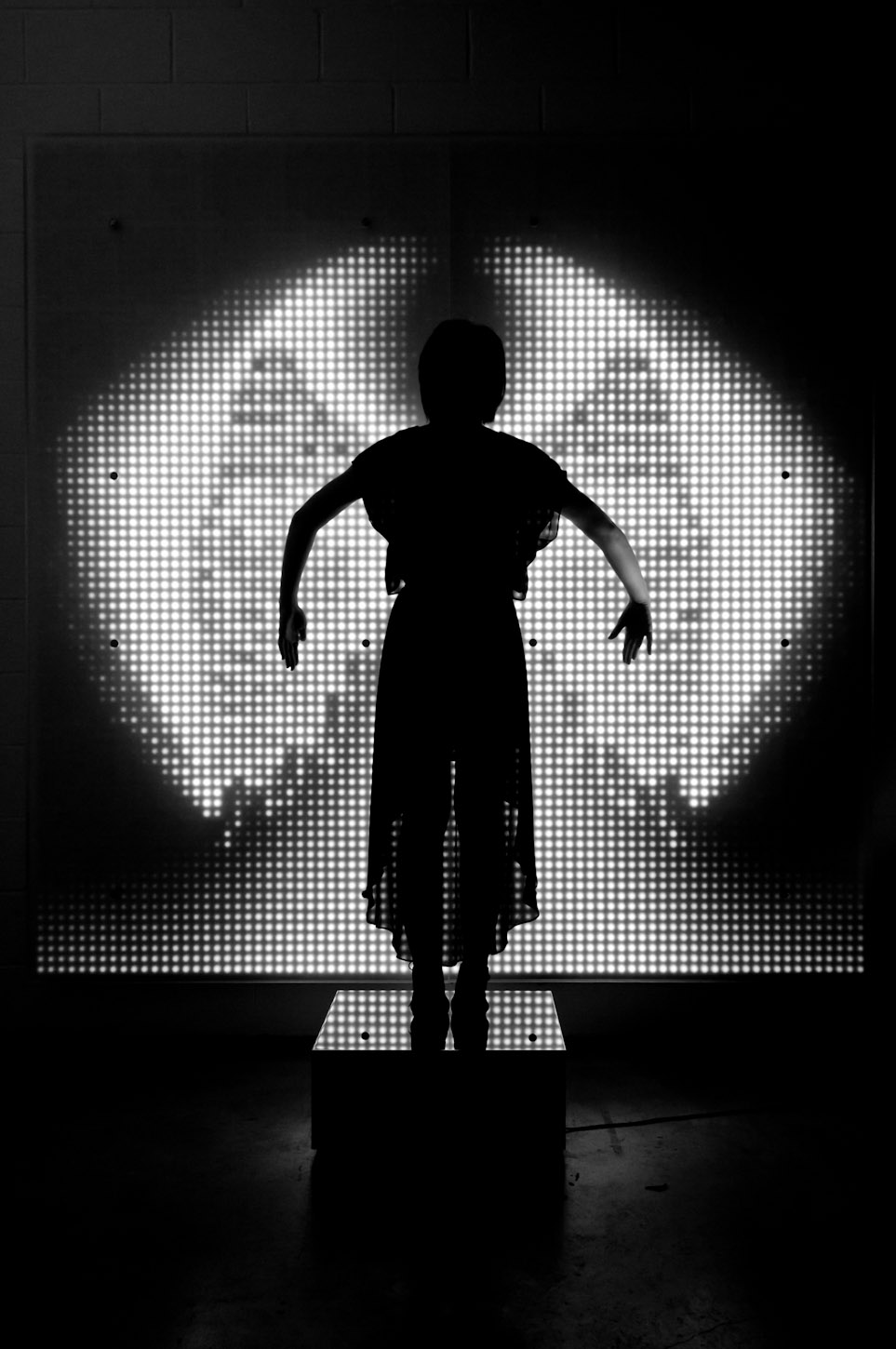
Ice Angel (2012) by Dominic Harris

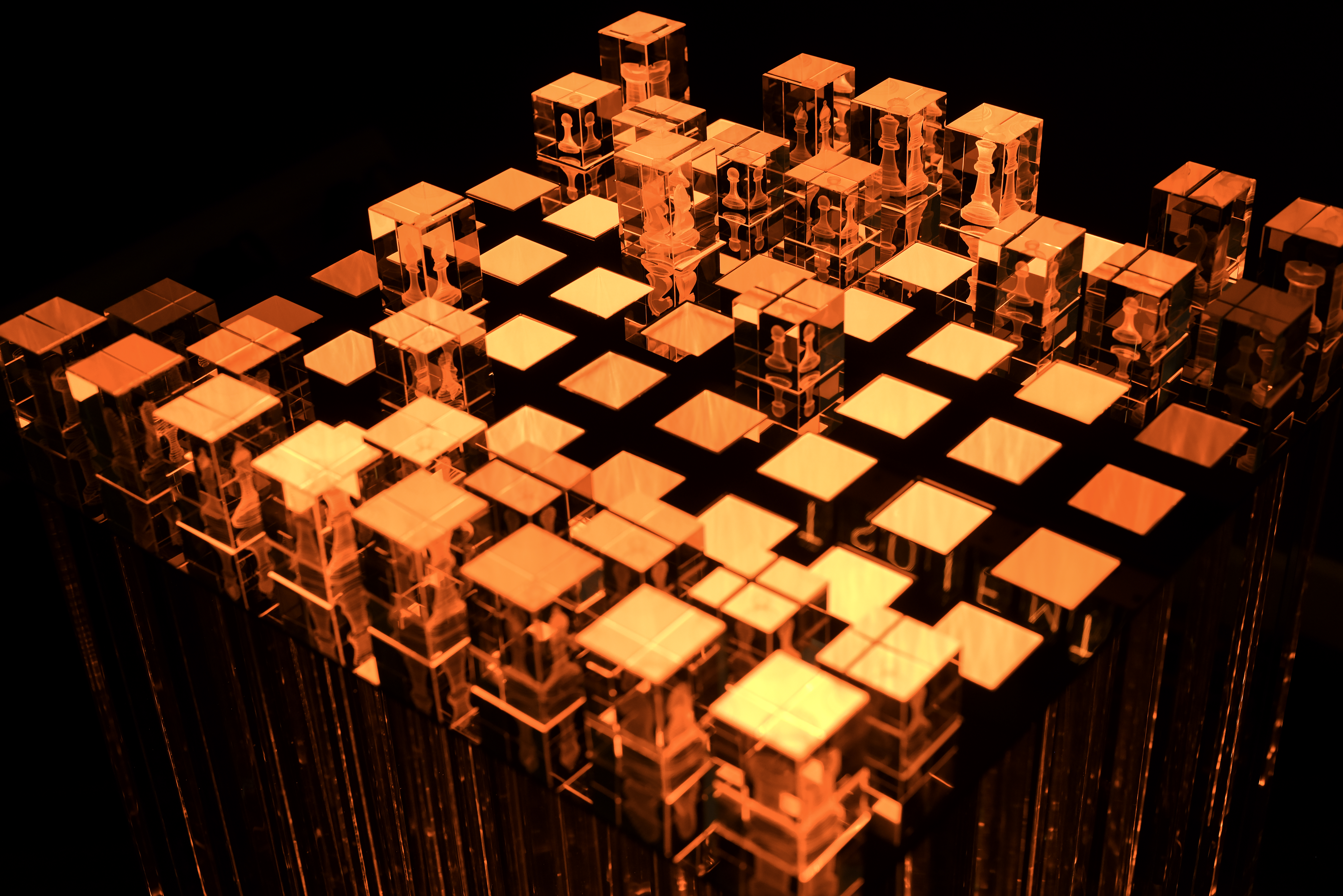
Chess Block (2013) by Dominic Harris

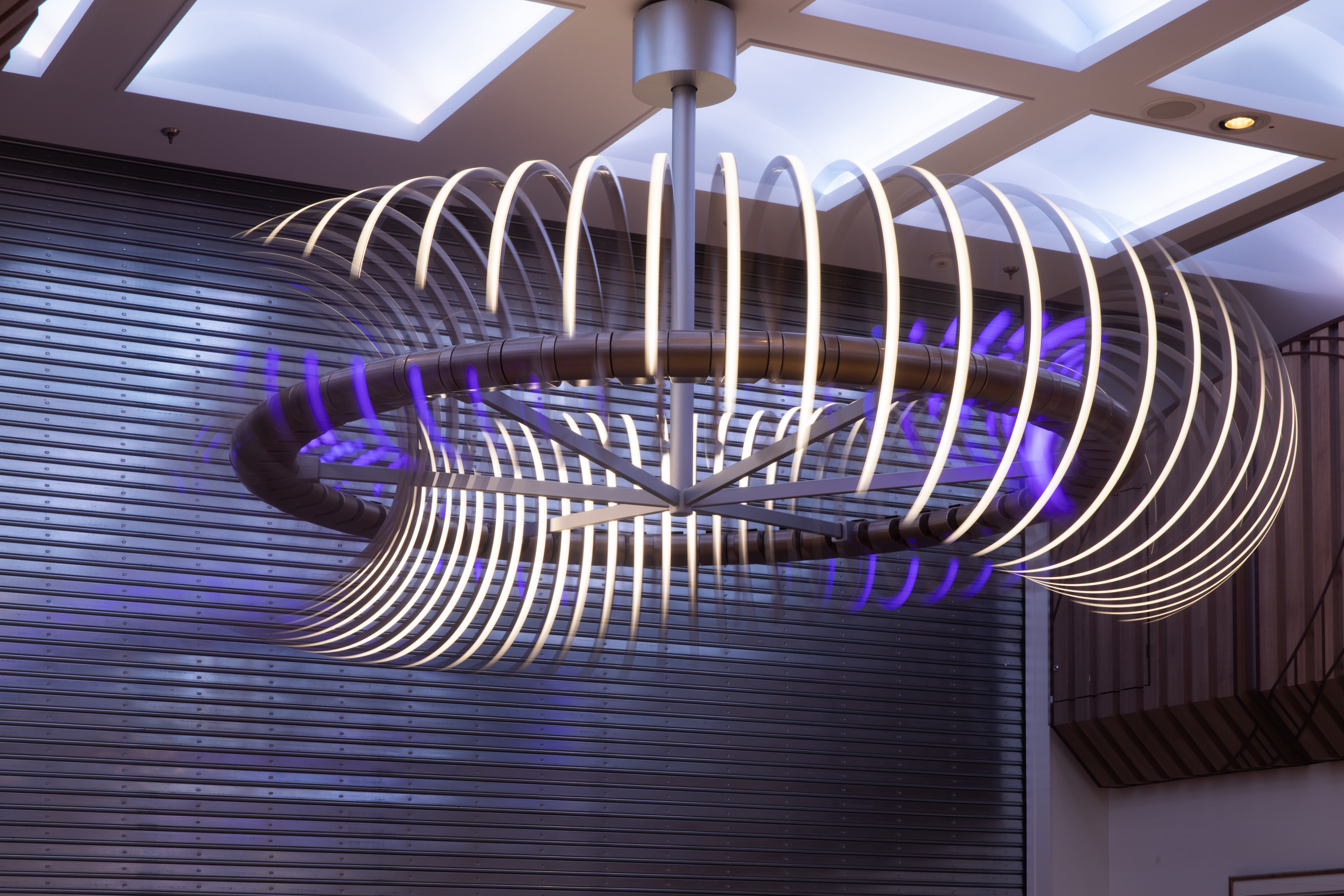
Swell (2019) by Dominic Harris. Commissioned for Royal Caribbean.

Title	Year	Details	Materials
October Series	2011	Lighting artworks exhibiting an infinity effect of changing colour palettes	Glass, LED, electronics, metal.
Four States	2011	Interactive video artwork in which the viewer manipulates black and white depictions of various states of water	Code, electronics, computer, display, 3D camera, metal.
Flutter	2011	Interactive video artwork comprising 88 video screens depicting the movement of a Morpho Helena butterfly in flight. This artwork can be found on public display at the Borusan Contemporary Art Collection	Code, electronics, sensors, computer, mirror, metal.
Ice Angel	2012	Interactive LED artwork in which the viewer becomes a performer who is depicted with their unique angel wings	Code, electronics, 3D sensor, computer, acrylic, metal.
Baby Flutter	2012	A series of interactive artworks depicting various species of butterflies	Code, electronics, display screen, aluminium.
Deep Blue Interactive Aquarium	2012	Interactive video artwork depicting a series of aquatic scenes	Code, electronics, computer, 4K touch display, 3D camera, metal.
Chess Block	2013	An illuminated colour changing chess board primarily fabricated from optical glass	Glass, LED, electronics, stainless steel.
Shimmer	2013	A series of illuminated colour studies in which the colours seen varies in relationship to the viewing angle	Glass, lightbox, stainless steel.
Ruffled	2014	A series of interactive animated studies of various species of birds	Code, display screen, electronics, aluminium, acrylic.
Stained Glass: Arboretum	2015	A transparent LCD screen artwork in which flower growths appear in interactive response to the viewer	Code, electronics, computer, transparent OLED display, 3D sensor, metal.
Flutter Wall	2015	A touch reactive array of butterflies arranged in a grid on the screen	Code, electronics, computer, 4K touch display, 3D camera, metal.
Digital Shimmer	2015	A three dimensional LED lighting art sculpture of oscillating colour blends	Code, electronics, GRG, metal.
Baby Angel	2015	A visual digital recording of the participants interaction when on Ice Angel	Corian, electronics, code.
Vanity Mirror	2015	An exploration of the multiplicity of the image in contemporary society	Cameras, screens, electronics, code, metal.
Conductor	2015	A highly interactive artwork allowing the participant to manipulate the planets with a variety of gestures	Code, electronics, computer, display, speakers, metal.
Disney's Snow White and the Seven Dwarfs	2015	An 8-screen interactive video artwork featuring real-time animated characters from the Snow White and Seven Dwarfs Disney movie. Made with the permission of The Walt Disney Company	Code, electronics, computer, display, 3D sensor, metal, acrylic
Bloomed	2016	A series of interactive animated studies of various species of flowers	Code, display screen, electronics, aluminium, acrylic.
Deserted	2016	A highly interactive digital artwork allowing the viewer to explore a series of desert scenes	Code, electronics, computer, 4K touch display, metal.
Flutter Hologram	2017	Electronically holographic display of butterflies projected within a glass bell jar	Code, electronics, screen, blown glass, acrylic, ply.
Flight is a Waltz: Puppet Flutter	2017	Electronically interactive model of a butterfly presented within a glass display jar. A collaboration between Harris and puppeteer, Oliver Smart	Brass, blown glass, aluminium, code, electronics.
Bloomed Wall	2017	A highly interactive digital artwork allowing the viewer to explore a series of scenes inspired by masters of the Dutch Golden Age	Code, electronics, computer, 4K touch display, 3D sensor, metal.
SIMULATED	2017	An interactive artwork using the resurrected technology of the Nixie tube	Nixie tubes, code, electronics, Corian, aluminium.
Baby Shimmer	2018	A study of the colour shifting volumes of light that respond to the movement of the viewer.	Glass, aluminium, electronics, acrylic.
Mickey & Minnie: An Interactive Diptych	2018	A two-screen interactive video artwork which allows viewers to act as the catalyst for unique interactions and character narratives from Mickey and Minnie Mouse. Made with the permission of The Walt Disney Company.	Code, electronics, computer, 4K touch display, 3D sensor, metal.
Swell	2019	A kinetic light sculpture commissioned for "Spectrum of the Seas", Royal Caribbean cruise ship.	Carbon fibre, electronics, code, Swarovski crystal, aluminium.
Metamorphosis Soliloquy	2020	Square format individual studies of different butterfly species realised as digital artworks responsive to the viewer.	Code, electronics, display, sensors, aluminium.
World Stage	2020	Large format interactive digital artworks depicting various flags of the world through the use of grids of butterflies.	Code, electronics, computer, 4K touch display, sensors, aluminium.
Limitless	2023	An interactive artwork displaying live data from the stock markets in the form of a perpetually growing tower of gold blocks.	Code, electronics, computer, 5K vertical touch display, sensors, aluminium.
Feeding Consciousness	2023	A free-standing sculpture in the form of the Tower of Babel that displays images from trending web-search terms as reported by Google.	Code, electronics, computer, screens, sensors, aluminium, steel.

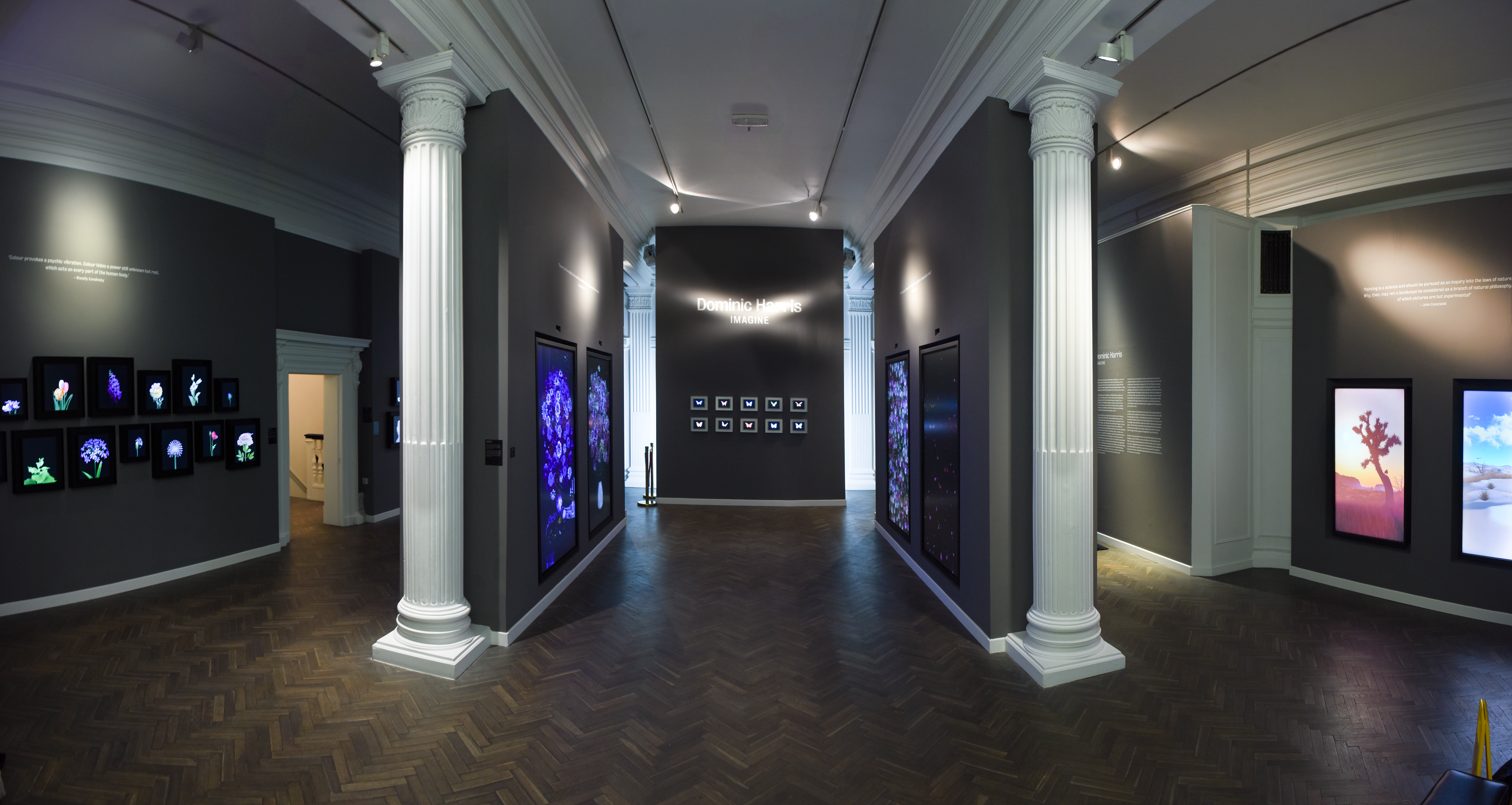
"Imagine" exhibition at Halcyon Gallery, 2019

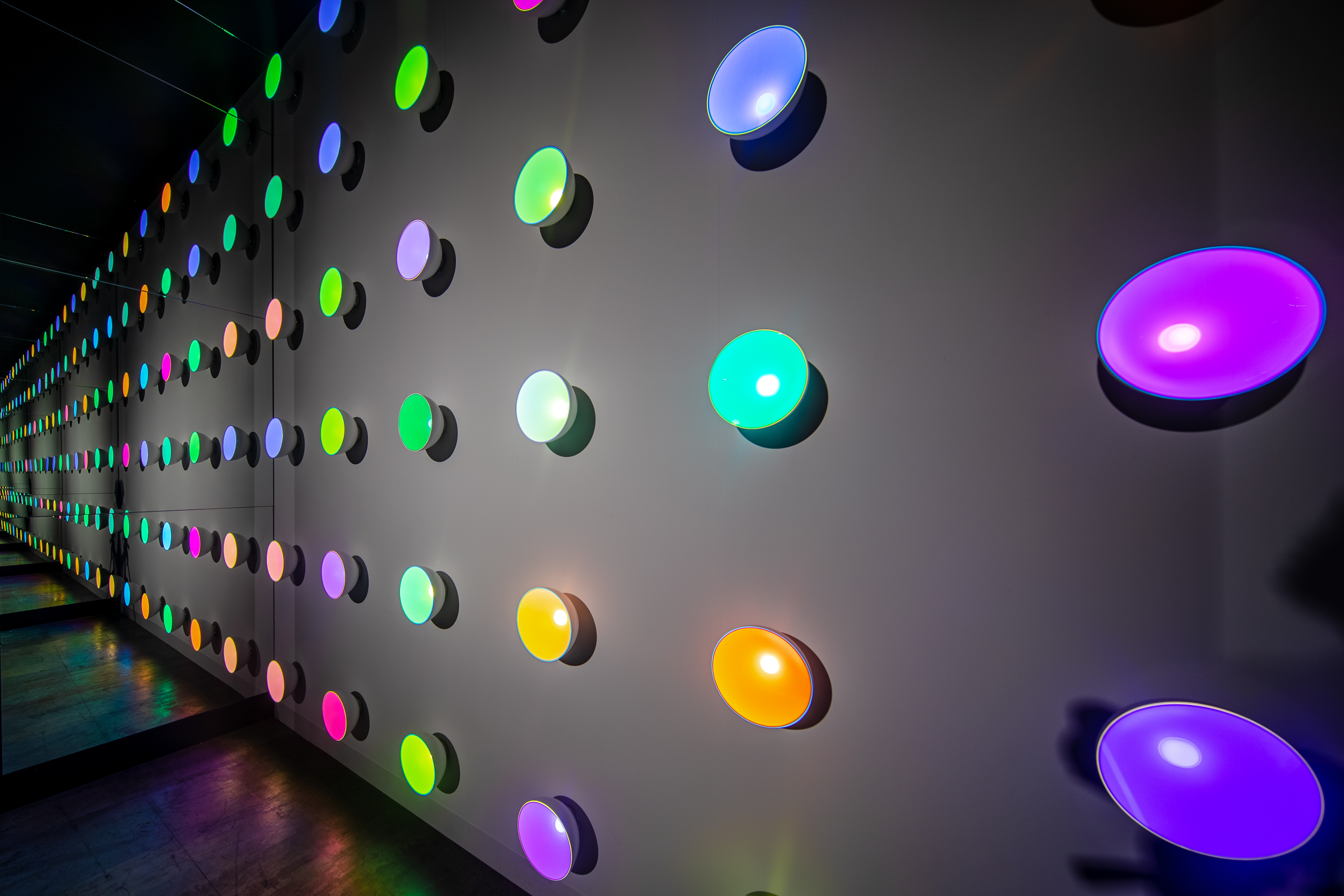
Baby Shimmer by Dominic Harris at Design Miami/Basel 2018

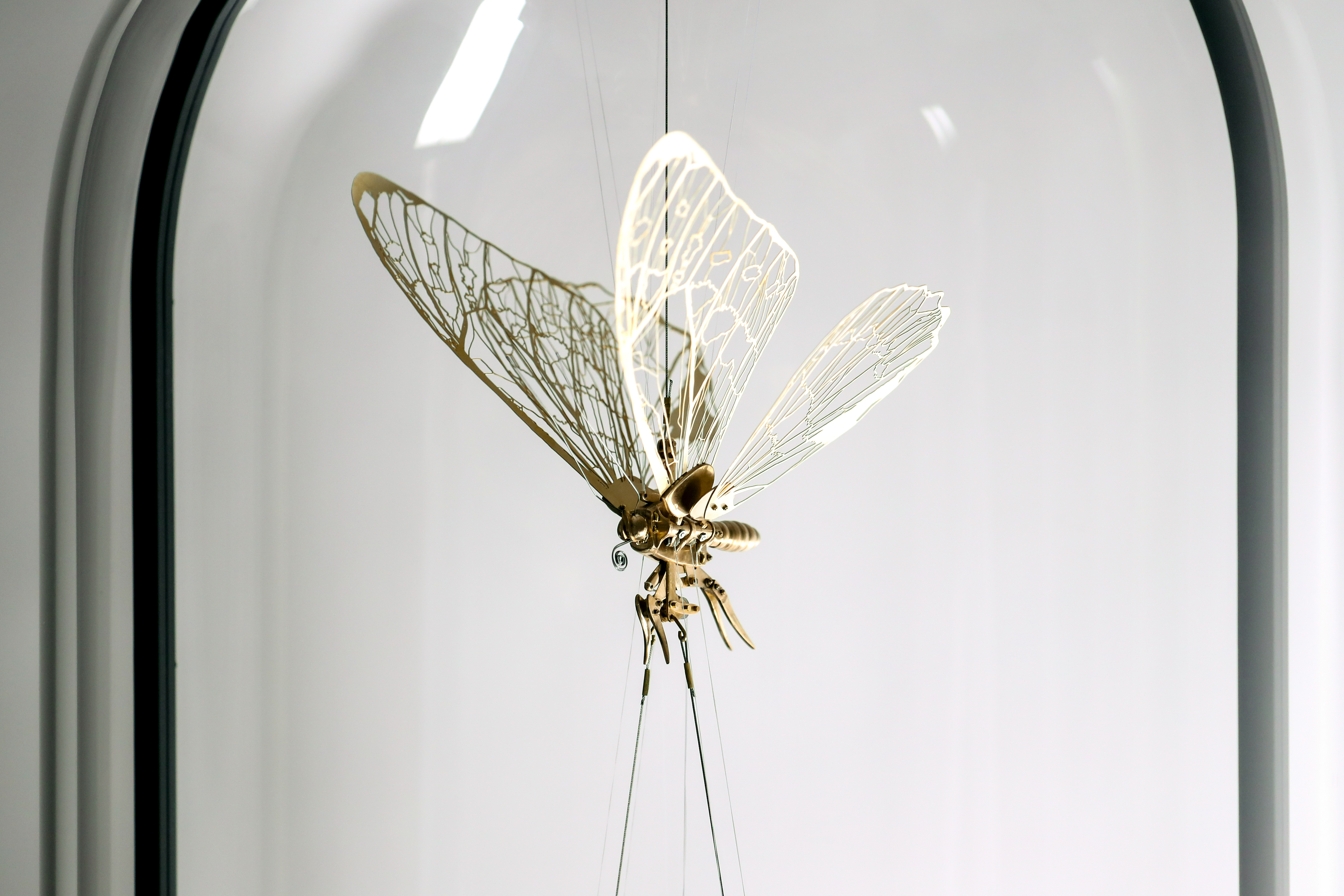
Flight is a Waltz: Puppet Flutter (2017) by Dominic Harris and Oliver Smart

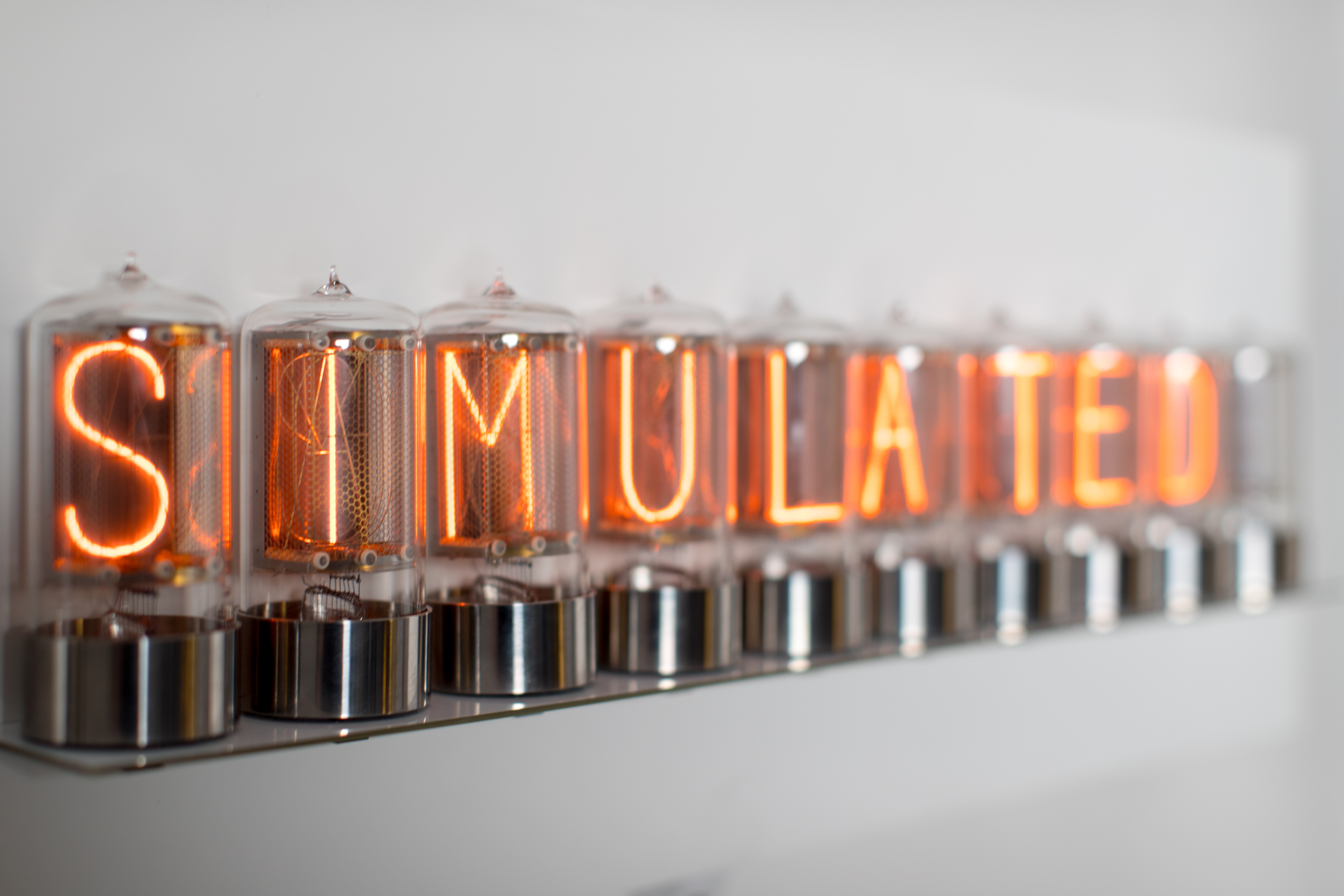
SIMULATED (10) artwork by Dominic Harris

== Exhibitions ==
The works of Dominic Harris have been exhibited internationally, both through direct and gallery representation.

Solo shows:

- "Feeding Consciousness" at Halcyon Gallery, Mayfair, London, UK – 2023
- "US: NOW" at Halcyon Gallery, Mayfair, London, UK – 2020
- "Imagine" at Halcyon Gallery, Mayfair, London, UK – 2019
- "5 Year Celebration", Priveekollektie Contemporary Art | Design, London, UK – 2016.
- "Moments of Reflection" at PHOS ART + DESIGN, Mayfair, London, UK – 2015

Recent exhibitions include:

- In Plain Sight, 2024 Halcyon Gallery
- Victoria & Albert Museum
- Dublin Science Museum
- Design Miami / Basel
- Design Miami
- Art Miami
- Art 14, London
- PAD Paris
- PAD London
- Art Geneva

== Gallery Representation ==
- 2010 to 2019: Dominic Harris was represented by Priveekollektie Contemporary Art | Design, a Dutch gallery based in Heusden, the Netherlands, and with a regular presence on the international art and design circuits.
- 2015: Dominic Harris was shown with PHOS ART + DESIGN Gallery, in Mayfair, London, UK.
- 2019 – ongoing: Dominic Harris is exclusively represented by the Halcyon Gallery, an established international gallery based in Mayfair, London.

== Collections ==
The majority of Harris's work has been bought by private collectors. Since 2012 Harris's work is also being acquired by several large institutional collections, including the Borusan Contemporary Art Collection in Istanbul. Harris's artworks include some of the biggest and most respected international art collectors and are also displayed in public spaces.

== Books ==
- Dominic Harris: Feeding Consciousness. Halcyon Gallery, 2023.
- Imagine: Dominic Harris (exhibition catalogue). Halcyon Gallery, 2019.
- A Touch Of Code: Documents the "Beacon" art installation and "Flutter" artwork (ISBN 978-3899553314)
- Dominic Harris, Artworks, Edition Eight. (ISBN 978-0957306325)
- Digital Real: Kunst & Nachhaltigkeit Vol 8.
