= Bob Dylan Center =

Museum in Tulsa, Oklahoma

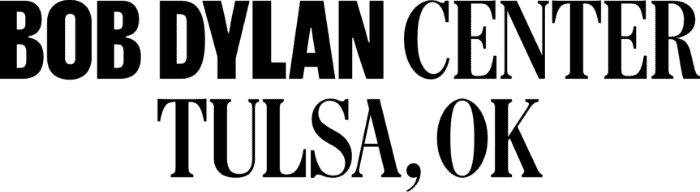

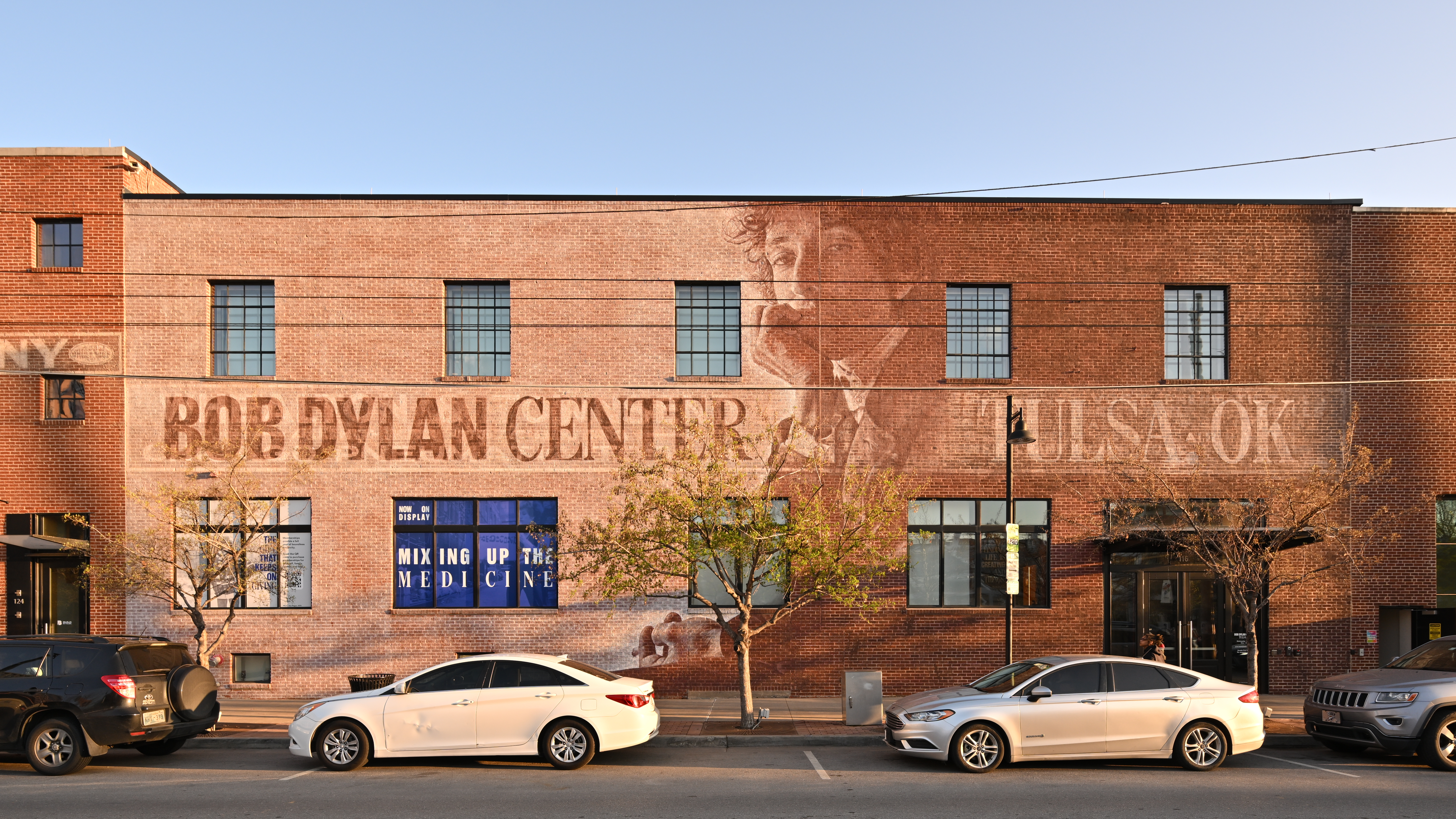
- The Bob Dylan Center in 2022
- Established: May 10, 2022
- Location: 116 E. Reconciliation Way; Tulsa, Oklahoma, U.S. 74103
- Coordinates: 36°09′31″N 95°59′30″W
- Director: Steven Jenkins
- Curator: Mark Davidson
- Architect: Olson Kundig
- Website: bobdylancenter.com

The Bob Dylan Center is a museum in Tulsa, Oklahoma, dedicated to the life and works of American singer-songwriter Bob Dylan.

In 2016, Dylan sold his archive to the Tulsa-based George Kaiser Family Foundation and the University of Tulsa. The foundation also operates the nearby Woody Guthrie Center with Guthrie's and Phil Ochs' archives, also located within the Tulsa Arts District.

The museum opened to the public on May 10, 2022.

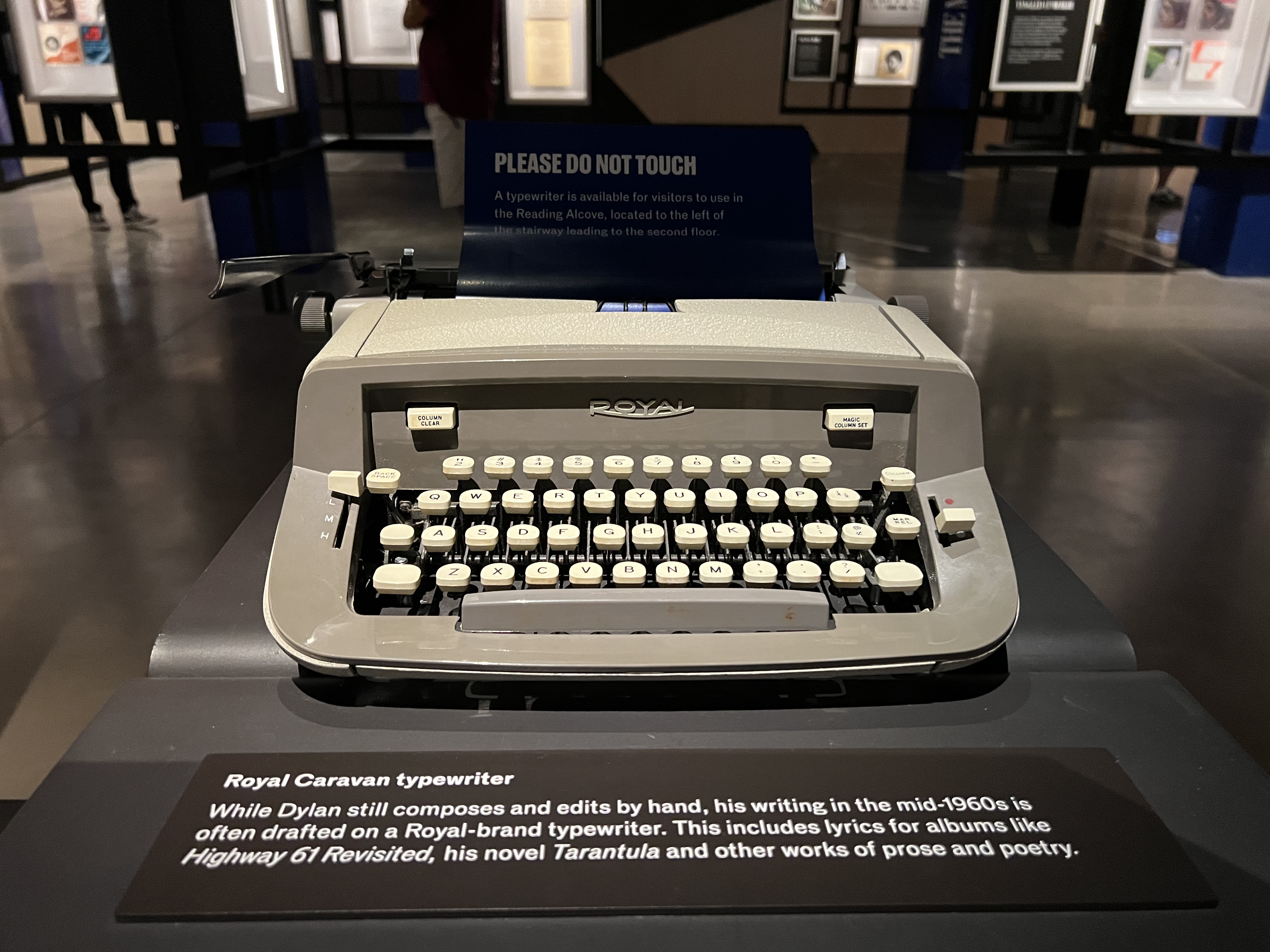
A Royal Caravan typewriter, the model Dylan used to type with, on display in the Bob Dylan Center in Tulsa, Oklahoma.

An official publication of The Bob Dylan Center is the 608-page 2023 book Bob Dylan: Mixing Up the Medicine, a carefully curated selection of over 600 images including never-before-circulated draft lyrics, writings, photographs, drawings and other ephemera from the Dylan archive.
