= Bob Dylan: Mixing Up the Medicine =

2023 book by Parker Fishel and Mark Davidson

- Authors: Parker Fishel; Mark Davidson
- Language: English
- Subject: Bob Dylan's working life
- Publisher: Callaway Arts & Entertainment
- Publication date: October 2023
- Publication place: United States
- Media type: Print
- Pages: 608
- ISBN: 9781734537796

Bob Dylan: Mixing Up the Medicine is a book about Bob Dylan by Parker Fishel and Mark Davidson, an official publication of The Bob Dylan Center, released in 2023. Its title is a reference to a line from the classic song "Subterranean Homesick Blues". The book takes a close look at the full scope of Dylan's working life, particularly from the perspective of his ongoing and shifting creative processes from his early years to his more recent output. It contains a selection of over 1,100 images including never-before-circulated draft lyrics, writings, photographs, drawings and other ephemera from the Bob Dylan Archive. The book also has a companion album consisting of 12 classic songs by Dylan. The book received favorable reviews.

== Reception ==
It was named "Book of the Year" by Uncut magazine. June Sawyers wrote in the Booklist, that the book is a "cornucopia, a treasure trove, a mother lode, a bonanza [...] a volume to peruse and slowly savor, this is nothing less than a profound cultural statement, and is a feast for the eye and the brain". American music journalist Rob Sheffield praised the book in his review for The New York Times. Sheffield says the artifacts in the book are "full of history", like the fan mail Dylan receives from Paul McCartney, Bruce Springsteen and George Harrison, and a handwritten draft of the lyrics to Dylan's 1985 song "Tight Connection to My Heart", which includes dialogue from a 1967 Star Trek episode. Sheffield opines that the book "enshrines a history that Dylan has already slipped away from, a history where he's determined not to get trapped, and that is a "road map of places he has left behind".

Gregory Stall of the Library Journal, says the book is really not a biography; "it's more of a series of biographical snapshots", and "it introduces enticing new scholarship in the Dylan historiography to be studied and celebrated for generations to come". Erica Ciccarone from BookPage writes that the book is a "immaculately designed compendium that seemingly encompasses all possible sides of the legend". She also states that for all its "heft and weight, keeps the man in motion—dazzling, beguiling and multidimensional". American writer Lucy Sante also lauded the book in her review for Literary Hub. She talks about pages of Dylan's personal notebooks, which are featured in the book, she says that the inclusion of the notebooks "serve up Bob Dylan live and in color in various hectic portions of 1964 and 1965":

You see him in cars, in bars, in airports and gas stations and people's porches and living rooms, maybe with his shades on, smoking cigarettes, meeting interesting people, hearing the radio in the car or the kitchen, turning words and phrases loose from the accumulation in his subconscious and letting them fly around until they find a thermal and float home. The experience is as good as a movie.

== Album track listing ==
The book has a companion album consisting of 12 classic songs by Dylan. It was released on vinyl, CD and digital platforms.

1. The Times They Are A-Changin' 3:13
2. Blowin' in the Wind 2:46
3. Like a Rolling Stone 6:07
4. Subterranean Homesick Blues 2:18
5. All Along the Watchtower 2:30
6. Lay Lady Lay 3:17
7. Forever Young 4:55
8. Tangled up in Blue 5:40
9. Hurricane 8:32
10. Knockin' on Heaven's Door 2:29
11. Make You Feel My Love 3:31
12. Things Have Changed 5:07

== See also ==
- Bob Dylan bibliography
- Bob Dylan discography
