= Anthony Scaduto =

American journalist and biographer (1932–2017)

Anthony Scaduto (March 7, 1932 – December 12, 2017) was an American journalist and biographer of rock musicians, who also wrote under the name Tony Sciacca. His most famous work is Dylan, a biography of Bob Dylan, first published in 1972. It is regarded as an influential book in the field, being one of the first to take an investigative approach to writing about his subject.

In 1974, Scaduto wrote Scapegoat, an investigation into the trial of Bruno Richard Hauptmann, who was executed in April 1936 for the kidnapping and murder of the Lindbergh baby. Scaduto's thesis was that Hauptmann was innocent and that the police either manufactured or suppressed vital evidence.

He also wrote biographies of Mick Jagger, Frank Sinatra, Marilyn Monroe and John F. Kennedy. Scaduto has also written for Playboy, Penthouse, the New York Post and soft porn magazine Oui. At the Post, he was known as an expert on crime and the Mafia.

He died on December 12, 2017, at the age of 85.
