= Jesús Ordovás =

Spanish journalist and radio broadcaster

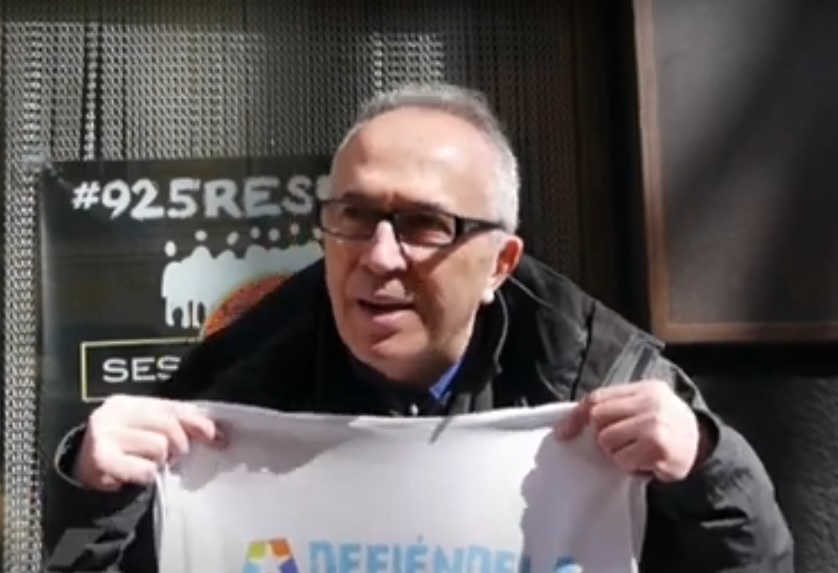
- Born: 1947 (age 78–79); Ferrol, A Coruña, Spain
- Occupations: Journalist, radio presenter

Jesús Ordovás (born 1947 in Ferrol, A Coruña, Spain) is a Spanish journalist and radio broadcaster.

== Biography ==
Jesús Ordovás was born in Ferrol (A Coruña) in 1947. He studied sociology in Madrid, where he combined his academic life with a growing interest in the evolving pop and rock music scene of the 1970s.

In 1974, he began contributing regularly to music publications such as AU, Ozono, and Disco Expres. In 1979, he became co-director, along with Jose M. Rey and Tomás Fdo. Flores, of the program Diario Pop on Radio 3, a station focused mainly on pop and rock music that strayed from the mainstream and commercial charts.

He is considered one of the leading promoters of the countercultural movement that emerged during the early years of Spain's democratic transition, known as the Movida Madrileña.

== Works ==
Ordovás has contributed to various newspapers and magazines, including El País, El Mundo, Diario 16, La Vanguardia, and Faro de Vigo, among others. He is also the author of several works, such as:

- De qué va el rrollo (What the Scene Is About, 1977). ISBN 9788474430011
- Bob Marley (1980). ISBN 978-84-334-2041-1
- El rock ácido de California (1983). ISBN 978-84-334-2023-7
- Historia de la música pop española (1987). ISBN 9788420602240
- Bob Dylan (1988). ISBN 978-84-334-0019-2
- Siniestro Total. Apocalipsis con grelos (1993). ISBN 978-84-604-8434-9
- La revolución pop (2002). ISBN 978-84-8211-367-8
- 25 años de pop con Radio 3 (2006). ISBN 978-84-441-0001-2
- Los discos esenciales del pop español (2010). ISBN 978-84-9785-674-4
- Viva el pop (2013). ISBN 978-84-9785-916-5
- El futuro ya está aquí (2014). ISBN 978-84-942650-9-9
- John Lennon (2014). ISBN 978-84-7737-863-1
- Esto no es Hawaii: La historia oculta del pop español (2016). ISBN 978-84-95749-13-0
- Fiebre de vivir (2017). ISBN 978-84-95749-17-8
- La movida madrileña y otras movidas (2020). ISBN 978-84-121098-3-2
- Guía del Madrid de La Movida (2020). ISBN 978-84-9158-303-5 With Patricia Godes.
- Jimmy Hendrix, el salvaje (2021). ISBN 978-84-122547-1-6
- Tu pelo no es muy normal (2025). ISBN 979-13-87694-02-9
