= Ukurik =

Ukurik Укурик
- Selo
- Location within Zabaykalsky Krai Location within Russia
- Coordinates: 51°40′N 111°49′E
- Country: Russia
- Region: Zabaykalsky Krai
- District: Khiloksky District
- Time zone: UTC+9:00

Ukurik (Russian: Укурик) is a rural locality (a selo) in Khiloksky District, Zabaykalsky Krai, Russia. Population: 89 (2021 census); 155 (2010 census); There are 6 streets in this selo.

== Geography ==
This rural locality is located 100 km from Khilok (the district's administrative centre), 123 km from Chita (capital of Zabaykalsky Krai) and 5,136 km from Moscow. Uletka is the nearest rural locality.
