= Tarantula (poetry collection) =

1971 poetry collection

- Recent paperback cover
- Author: Bob Dylan
- Language: English
- Genre: Experimental novel, prose poetry
- Publisher: Macmillan & Scribner
- Publication date: 1971 (unofficially available from 1966)
- Publication place: United States
- Media type: Print (hardback & paperback)
- Pages: 137 pp (hardback edition) & 149 pp (paperback edition)
- ISBN: 0-261-63337-6 (hardback edition) & ISBN 0-7432-3041-8 (paperback edition)
- OCLC: 185660501
- Followed by: Writings and Drawings

Tarantula is an experimental prose poetry collection by Bob Dylan, written in 1964 and 1965 and published in 1971. It employs stream of consciousness writing, somewhat in the style of Jack Kerouac, William S. Burroughs, and Allen Ginsberg.

Its style is also reminiscent of Arthur Rimbaud's in A Season in Hell. One section of the book parodies the Lead Belly song "Black Betty." Reviews of the book liken it to his self-penned liner notes to two of his albums recorded around the same time, Bringing It All Back Home and Highway 61 Revisited. The book follows a structure similar to that of a few of Dylan's songs; the vague story, references to various historical or made up characters and unusual punctuation. It also uses literary techniques such as allusion, ambiguity, symbolism and fantasy.

Dylan would later cite Tarantula as a book he had never fully signed up to write: "Things were running wild at that point. It never was my intention to write a book." He went on to equate the book to John Lennon's nonsensical work In His Own Write, and implied that his former manager Albert Grossman signed up Dylan to write the novel without the singer's full consent.

Although it was to be edited by Dylan and published in 1966, his motorcycle accident in July of that year prevented this. The first 50 copies were printed on A4 paper by the Albion underground press of San Francisco in mid-1965. The type-written pages were bound in yellow paper with a large red tick-like arachnid pictured on the front. Numerous bootleg versions of the book were available on the black market through 1971, when it was officially published, to critical scorn. In 2003 Spin magazine did an article called the "Top Five Unintelligible Sentences from Books Written by Rock Stars." Dylan came in first place with this line from Tarantula: "now's not the time to act silly, so wear your big boots & jump on the garbage clowns." In the early 21st century, Tarantula was re-released in English and translated into French, Spanish, Portuguese, Romanian, Croatian, Czech and Polish.
