= The Cambridge Companion to Bob Dylan =

2009 book

- Cover of the paperback edition
- Author: Multiple authors
- Subject: Music Of Bob Dylan
- Publisher: Cambridge University Press
- Publication date: February 19, 2009 (1st edition)
- Publication place: United States
- Media type: Print (hardback and paperback)
- Pages: 204 pp
- ISBN: 0-521-71494-X (1st edition, paperback)

The Cambridge Companion to Bob Dylan is a book published in 2009 by Cambridge University Press intended to analyze the work of American singer-songwriter Bob Dylan. It is the fourth book of Cambridge Companion to American Studies. This book is edited by Kevin J. Dettmar and contains seventeen essays, each written by a different person.

The whole book is divided in two sections. The first one ("Perspectives"), containing nine essays, attempts to describe different sides of Dylan's work. The next section ("Landmark Albums") describes eight landmark Dylan albums. The collection includes contributions from Michael Denning, David Yaffe, Anthony DeCurtis, Alan Light, R. Clifton Spargo, novelist Jonathan Lethem and musician Carrie Brownstein.

== Reception ==
Kieran Curran of PopMatters gave the book 5 stars out of 10, and stated: "it's an interesting read for the academically inclined budding Dylanologist [...], even if it is lacking in a pop musicology sense. For the unconverted to Dylan though, there would be no point in picking this up – every essay is built upon the assumption that Dylan is worthy of extended proselytising."
