= Writings and Drawings =

1973 book by Bob Dylan

- Author: Bob Dylan
- Illustrator: Bob Dylan
- Cover artist: Bob Dylan
- Language: English
- Genre: Music
- Publisher: Alfred A. Knopf, Inc.
- Publication date: 1973
- Publication place: United States/Canada
- Pages: 368
- ISBN: 978-0-586-04088-1
- OCLC: 16364299
- Preceded by: Tarantula
- Followed by: Lyrics: 1962–1985

Writings and Drawings is a collection of lyrics and personal drawings from Bob Dylan. It was published in 1973 and is currently out-of-print. The book contains Dylan's lyrics in chronological order, from 1962's Bob Dylan to 1970's New Morning. Also included within the book are poems and other writings, with songs presented in bold black and other writings in faded grey. The lyrics and writings are arranged by album era, with unreleased songs grouped with the album of its period. The list price for the new book c. 1973 was $6.95. Later superseded by the 'Lyrics' collection.

== See also ==
- Lyrics: 1962–1985
- Lyrics: 1962-2001
- The Lyrics: Since 1962
- Lyrics: 1962-2012
