= Halcyon Gallery =

Contemporary art gallery in London

Coordinates: 51.5104°N 0.1452°W

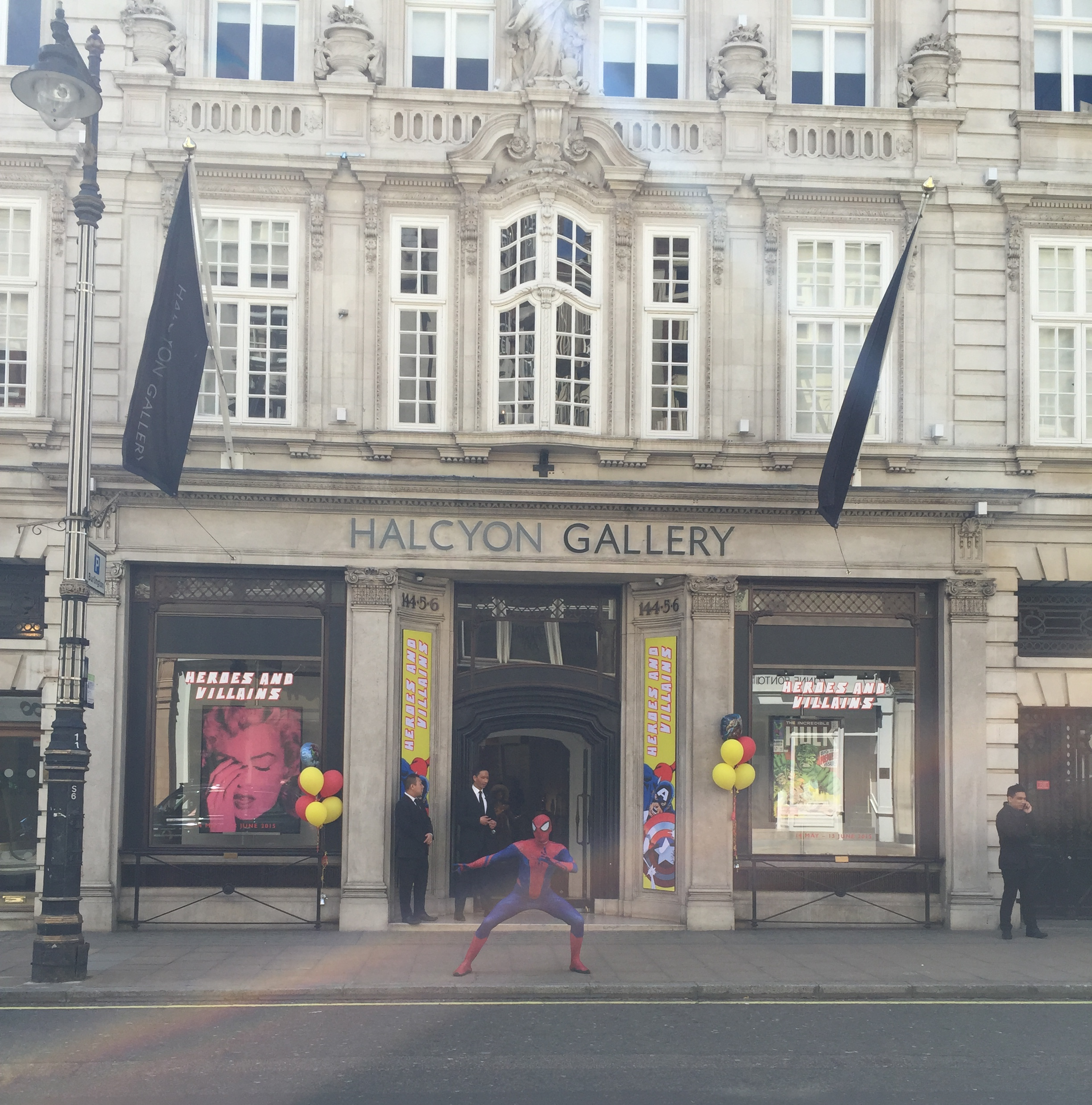
A person dressed as Spider-Man for the Halcyon Gallery's "Heroes and Villains" exhibition in 2015

Halcyon Gallery is a contemporary art gallery in London. Founded by Paul Green in 1982 in Birmingham, Halcyon Gallery has more than 40 years of experience working with, developing and showcasing both established and emerging contemporary artists as well as modern masters from Impressionism to Pop Art.

== Location ==
The gallery has three locations in London. There are two galleries located on New Bond Street in Mayfair, London, and a gallery in Harrods, Knightsbridge. Halcyon Gallery has recently expanded globally and opened their New York Gallery at 413/415 West Broadway in SoHo.

== Overview ==
Halcyon Gallery was founded in 1982 by Paul Green. The gallery's represented artists include Dominic Harris, Mitch Griffiths, James McQueen, and the musician Bob Dylan. It also owns works by Andy Warhol, David Hockney, Pierre-Auguste Renoir, Pablo Picasso, and Claude Monet.

Halcyon has three London galleries: two on New Bond Street and one at Harrods in Knightsbridge. Its flagship at 148 New Bond Street gallery is located in one of London’s oldest and most prestigious commercial gallery spaces. The Art Nouveau building was designed and built by celebrated architect Edward William Godwin in 1881, and was previously home to the Fine Arts Society for 142 years.

Halcyon Gallery took possession of the listed address in 2019, undertaking a historically sympathetic yet comprehensive redesign of the building’s interior, resulting in the creation of an ultra-modern art space. The gallery opened its doors in Spring 2023.

For more than 25 years, Halcyon Gallery has partnered with the department store, Harrods. The 5,000 square ft gallery space is situated on the third floor of Harrods and exhibits of works by leading international artists.

Halcyon Gallery has a commitment to art-led, philanthropic initiatives within the charitable and public sectors. The Gallery works with a carefully selected number of charities and non-profit organisations, including The Royal Parks Foundation and HRH The Duke of Edinburgh’s Award World Fellowship. Founder and President Paul Green says: “We believe in the life-enhancing value of art and through our exhibition programme, public sculpture placements and museum partnerships, we strive to make art accessible to all.”

The Gallery has also been involved in a series of public sculpture installations in numerous countries worldwide, from London’s Hyde Park to the Grand Canal in Venice, the courtyard of the State Hermitage in Saint Petersburg to Shanghai’s Financial district.

Ehud Sheleg, the treasurer of the UK's Conservative Party, became director in 1999.
