= Subterranean Home Sick Blues: A Tribute to Bob Dylan's Bringing It All Back Home =

Compilation album by various artists
- Released: October 5, 2010
- Genre: Folk rock
- Label: Reimagine Music

Subterranean Home Sick Blues: A Tribute to Bob Dylan's Bringing It All Back Home is a 2010 digitally-released tribute to Bob Dylan's album Bringing It All Back Home. Sixteen artists collaborated to compile the album, which was released on October 5, 2010, by Reimagine Music.

The first eleven songs of the compilation appeared on Dylan's Bringing It All Back Home. The twelfth song was released only as a single, while the final four songs appeared on Dylan's official "bootleg" albums.

== Track listing ==
All tracks are written by Bob Dylan. Unless noted, the songs originally appeared on Bringing It All Back Home.

| No. | Title | Performer | Length |
|---|---|---|---|
| 1. | "Subterranean Homesick Blues" | Peter Morén | 3:31 |
| 2. | "She Belongs to Me" | Ane Brun | 4:46 |
| 3. | "Maggie's Farm" | Castanets | 3:40 |
| 4. | "Love Minus Zero/No Limit" | Mirah | 3:46 |
| 5. | "Outlaw Blues" | The Morning Benders | 4:00 |
| 6. | "On the Road Again" | Julie Doiron | 3:35 |
| 7. | "Bob Dylan's 115th Dream" | Asobi Seksu | 4:14 |
| 8. | "Mr. Tambourine Man" | Helio Sequence | 5:43 |
| 9. | "Gates of Eden" | DM Stith | 6:11 |
| 10. | "It's Alright, Ma (I'm Only Bleeding)" | Franz Nicolay | 6:18 |
| 11. | "It's All Over Now, Baby Blue" | Sholi | 3:28 |
| 12. | "If You Gotta Go, Go Now" (released as a single) | J. Tillman | 3:45 |
| 13. | "Sitting On A Barbed Wire Fence" (from The Bootleg Series Volumes 1–3 (Rare & Unreleased) 1961–1991) | Sea Wolf | 4:23 |
| 14. | "I'll Keep It With Mine" (from The Bootleg Series Volumes 1–3 (Rare & Unreleased) 1961–1991) | Denison Witmer | 4:13 |
| 15. | "Mama, You've Been on My Mind" (from The Bootleg Series Volumes 1–3 (Rare & Unreleased) 1961–1991) | Laura Veirs | 2:36 |
| 16. | "Farewell, Angelina" (from The Bootleg Series Volumes 1–3 (Rare & Unreleased) 1961–1991) | William Fitzsimmons | 5:13 |

== See also ==
- List of songs written by Bob Dylan
- List of artists who have covered Bob Dylan songs
