= Bobby Gregg =

American drummer (1936–2014)

- Gregg in 1963

Background information
- Born: Robert Grego; April 30, 1936; Philadelphia, Pennsylvania, U.S.
- Died: May 3, 2014 (aged 78) Las Vegas, Nevada, U.S.
- Occupations: Musician; record producer
- Instrument: Drums

Robert J. Gregg (born Robert Grego; April 30, 1936 – May 3, 2014) was an American musician who performed as a drummer and record producer. As a drum soloist and band leader he recorded one album and several singles, including one Top 40 single in the United States. But he is better known for his work as a drummer on several seminal 1960s songs, including Bob Dylan's "Like a Rolling Stone" and Simon and Garfunkel's "The Sound of Silence". He was also temporarily a member of the Hawks, which later became known as the Band.

== Early career ==
Gregg first attracted attention by 1955 as the only white member of the otherwise all-black group Steve Gibson and the Red Caps. By 1962, he fronted Bobby Gregg and His Friends for an instrumental single, "The Jam - Part 1", which reached #14 on the Billboard R&B chart and #29 on the Billboard Hot 100 chart. The B-side of the single was "The Jam – Part 2". That same year, Gregg put out another instrumental single titled "Potato Peeler", which only reached #89 on the Billboard's Hot 100, but became well known for containing the first ever known pinch harmonic to be in a song. Guitarist Roy Buchanan crafted the technique. The song bears a strong resemblance to another instrumental record, "The Hunch" performed by The Bobby Peterson Quintet, which was released 3 years earlier in 1959. In 1963, he put out an album, released on Epic Records, called Let's Stomp and Wild Weekend. In 1964 and 1965, he released the singles "Any Number Can Win", "MacDougal Street", "It's Good to Me" and "Charly Ba-Ba". He also acted as a record producer at this time, producing songs by Sun Ra, Erma Franklin, Richard "Popcorn" Wylie and Frank Hunter. He sometimes played the drums on the records he produced. Gregg was also a house studio drummer for Cameo-Parkway Records (a successful independent record label based in Philadelphia) in the late 1950s and early 1960s. While he was there, he played for artists such as Bobby Rydell, Chubby Checker, The Dovells, Dee Dee Sharp, and others on many of the label's hits. He continued to do this until the hits dried up for the label during the British Invasion, and that is when he moved from Philadelphia to New York officially in 1964.

== Work with Bob Dylan ==
In 1964, as an experiment, Bob Dylan's producer Tom Wilson wanted to see what Dylan's 1962 recording of "House of the Rising Sun" would sound like if the original solo acoustic guitar backing was replaced by a band playing electric instruments. Gregg was brought in to play drums on the replacement backing track.

In January 1965, Gregg got to work with Dylan as the drummer on the songs on the electric side of the album Bringing It All Back Home. Gregg recorded the album takes of "Subterranean Homesick Blues", "She Belongs to Me", "Love Minus Zero/No Limit", "Outlaw Blues" and "Bob Dylan's 115th Dream" on January 14, 1965, and recorded the album takes of "Maggie's Farm" and "On the Road Again" on January 15, 1965.

On June 15, 1965, when Dylan was ready to record "Like a Rolling Stone", several of the musicians from the Bringing It All Back Home sessions including Gregg were called on to back him. Thus, it is Gregg's pistol-like snare drum shot that opens the song, as well as the album Highway 61 Revisited. "Like a Rolling Stone" eventually reached #2 on the Billboard Hot 100 chart, and in 2004 was named by Rolling Stone as the #1 song of all time.

The remainder of the Highway 61 Revisited album was recorded between July 29 and August 4, 1965. Gregg was the drummer for the July 29 and 30 sessions that produced "Tombstone Blues", "It Takes a Lot to Laugh, It Takes a Train to Cry" and "From a Buick 6". He was also the drummer for the July 29 recording of "Positively 4th Street", which was left off the Highway 61 Revisited album but became a Top 10 single in both the United States and the UK. At the August 2 session at which "Queen Jane Approximately", "Highway 61 Revisited", "Just Like Tom Thumb's Blues" and "Ballad of a Thin Man" were recorded, Sam Lay played the drums early in the session due to Gregg's other commitments, with Gregg joining the session later. Although Lay is believed to be the drummer on the album take of "Highway 61 Revisited" and played on several takes of "Just Like Tom Thumb's Blues", the album take of the latter song is generally believed to be one that Gregg played on. Gregg was also the likely drummer for "Queen Jane Approximately" and "Ballad of a Thin Man", meaning that he played on all the songs on the album except "Highway 61 Revisited" and "Desolation Row" (on which there is no drum part); he is the only drummer credited on the album.

In November 1965, Gregg joined the Hawks, who were then backing Dylan on tour, when Hawks' drummer Levon Helm left. He remained with the Hawks for about a month before being replaced by Sandy Konikoff. He recorded with Dylan in the November 30 sessions at which an early version of "Visions of Johanna" and possibly the single release of "Can You Please Crawl Out Your Window?" were recorded. He also recorded with Dylan at the January 1966 Blonde on Blonde sessions at which "One of Us Must Know (Sooner or Later)" was recorded, as well as several other songs which either did not make the album or were rerecorded later for the album, including "I'll Keep It With Mine", which was eventually released on The Bootleg Series Volumes 1–3 (Rare & Unreleased) 1961–1991.

== Work with other artists ==
In 1965 Tom Wilson, who had produced Dylan's Bringing It All Back Home and "Like a Rolling Stone" decided to experiment with electrifying the Simon & Garfunkel song "The Sound of Silence". An acoustic version of "The Sound of Silence" had been released on the Simon & Garfunkel album Wednesday Morning, 3 A.M.. As he did with Dylan's version of "The House of the Rising Sun", Wilson employed a band to record an electric backing track for the song, without Paul Simon's or Art Garfunkel's knowledge. Bobby Gregg was once again the drummer Wilson employed in the band creating this backing track. The version of "The Sound of Silence" incorporating the electric band backing track became a #1 hit and was released on the Simon & Garfunkel album Sounds of Silence. It was also listed by Rolling Stone as the #156 song of all time.

In 1966, Gregg was one of the drummers backing Peter, Paul and Mary for their album The Peter, Paul and Mary Album. In 1971, he backed John Cale and Terry Riley on their album Church of Anthrax.

== Death ==
Gregg died on May 3, 2014, at the age of 78.
