= Sara Dylan =

American model and actress (born 1939)

- Born: Shirley Marlin Noznisky; October 28, 1939 (age 86); Wilmington, Delaware, U.S.
- Other name: Sara Lownds
- Occupations: Actress, model
- Spouse(s): Hans Lownds (m. 1959; div. c. 1961/1962) Bob Dylan (m. 1965; div. 1977)
- Children: 5, including Jesse and Jakob Dylan

Sara Dylan (born Shirley Marlin Noznisky; October 28, 1939) is an American former actress and model who was the first wife of singer-songwriter Bob Dylan. In 1959, Noznisky married magazine photographer Hans Lownds; during their marriage, she was known as Sara Lownds.

She was married to Bob Dylan from 1965 until their 1977 divorce; they had four children together, and he adopted her daughter from her first marriage. Their marriage has been described by music writers and biographers as the inspiration for many songs Dylan created during the 1960s and '70s, and the 1975 album Blood on the Tracks has been described by many as Dylan's account of their disintegrating marriage.

Sara Dylan played the role of Clara in the 1978 film Renaldo and Clara, directed by Dylan, and the film was described by a Dylan biographer as "in part a tribute to his wife".

== Early life ==
Shirley Marlin Noznisky was born in Wilmington, Delaware, to Jewish parents Isaac and Bessie Noznisky; her father became a US citizen in 1912. Isaac set up a scrap metal business at South Claymont Street, Wilmington. He was shot dead by a drunken fellow East European immigrant on November 18, 1956. Shirley Noznisky had one older brother, Julius.

In 1959, Shirley moved to New York City and married magazine photographer Hans Lownds; Shirley was his third wife. Lownds persuaded her to change her name to Sara because his first wife, also named Shirley, had left him and he did not want to be reminded of his previous marriage. Sara and Hans lived in a five-story house on 60th Street in Manhattan, between Second and Third Avenues. Sara had a modeling career and appeared in Harper's Bazaar as the 'lovely luscious Sara Lownds', then became pregnant. They had a daughter, within a year of the birth, the marriage began to fail.

Sara started going out on her own, driving around town in an MG sports car Hans had given her, and gravitated to the youthful scene in Greenwich Village. Sometime in early 1964, she met Bob Dylan. When they met, Sara was still married to Hans, and Dylan was romantically linked to Joan Baez. "Bob was the reason" that Sara left Hans, according to Peter Lownds, Hans' son from a previous marriage. In November 1964, a friend of Sara's, Sally Buehler, married Dylan's manager Albert Grossman; Dylan and Sara were guests at the wedding.

After Hans and Sara separated, Sara went to work as a secretary for the film production division of the Time Life company, where filmmakers Richard Leacock and D. A. Pennebaker were impressed with her resourcefulness. "She was supposed to be a secretary," said Pennebaker, "but she ran the place." Sara introduced Bob Dylan and Albert Grossman to Pennebaker, the director who would make the film Dont Look Back, about Dylan's UK tour in April 1965.

== Marriage to Bob Dylan ==
Lownds and Dylan became romantically involved in 1964; soon afterwards, they moved into separate rooms in New York's Hotel Chelsea to be near one another. Dylan biographer Robert Shelton, who knew Dylan and Lownds in the mid-1960s, writes that Lownds "had a Romany spirit, seeming to be wise beyond her years, knowledgeable about magic, folklore and traditional wisdom".

Author David Hajdu described her as "well read, a good conversationalist and better listener, resourceful, a quick study, and good hearted. She impressed some people as shy and quiet, others as supremely confident; either way, she appeared to do only what she felt needed to be done."

In September 1965, Dylan commenced his first "electric" tour of the United States, backed by the Hawks. During a break in the tour, Dylan married Lownds – now pregnant with Jesse Dylan—on November 22, 1965. According to Dylan biographer Howard Sounes, the wedding took place under an oak tree outside a judge's office on Long Island, and the only other participants were Albert Grossman and a maid of honor for Lownds. Robbie Robertson, who was playing lead guitar on the tour, has described in his memoir how he received a phone call that morning to accompany the couple to a courthouse on Long Island, and then to a reception hosted by Albert and Sally Grossman at the Algonquin Hotel. Some of Dylan's friends (including Ramblin' Jack Elliott) claim that, in conversation immediately after the event, Dylan denied that he was married. Journalist Nora Ephron first made the news public in the New York Post in February 1966 with the headline "Hush! Bob Dylan is wed."

Dylan and Lownds (now Sara Dylan) had four children: Jesse, Anna, Samuel and Jakob. Dylan also adopted Maria, Sara's daughter from her first marriage. During these years of domestic stability, they lived in Woodstock in upstate New York.

In 1973, the Dylans sold their Woodstock home and purchased a modest property on the Point Dume peninsula in Malibu, California. They commenced constructing a large home on this site, and the re-modelling of the house occupied the next two years. Sounes writes that during this period, tensions began to appear in their marriage. The Dylans still retained a house in Manhattan. In April 1974, Dylan began to take art classes with artist Norman Raeben in New York. Dylan later said in an interview that the art lessons caused problems in his marriage: "I went home after that first day and my wife never did understand me ever since that day. That's when our marriage started breaking up. She never knew what I was talking about, what I was thinking about, and I couldn't possibly explain it."

Notwithstanding these tensions, Sara Dylan accompanied Dylan on much of the first stage of the Rolling Thunder Revue, from October to December 1975. The Revue formed the backdrop to the shooting of the film Renaldo and Clara, directed by Dylan. Sara Dylan appeared in many scenes in this semi-improvised movie, playing Clara to Dylan's Renaldo. Joan Baez, a former lover of Dylan, was also a featured performer on the Revue and appeared in the film as The Woman in White. In one scene, Baez tells Dylan, "You went off and got married first and didn't tell me. You should have told me or something." Dylan replies, "But I married the woman I loved."

Sounes suggests that the film may have been in part Dylan's tribute to his wife, since his film production company, Lombard Street Films, was named after the street in Wilmington where she was born.

== Later life ==
During the divorce proceedings, Sara Dylan was represented by attorney Marvin Mitchelson. Mitchelson later estimated that the settlement agreed was worth about $36 million to Sara Dylan and included "half the royalties from the songs written during their marriage". Michael Gray has written: "A condition of the settlement was that Sara would remain silent about her life with Dylan. She has done so." By some reports, Dylan and Sara remained friends after the acrimony of the divorce subsided, and Clinton Heylin writes that the photo of Dylan on a hillside in Jerusalem, which appeared on the inner sleeve of the 1983 album Infidels, was taken by her.

According to Howard Sounes in his book Down the Highway: The Life of Bob Dylan, Sara Dylan "dated a number of men after her divorce including Bob's friend David Blue".

Discussing his parents' marriage, Jakob Dylan said in 2005: "My father said it himself in an interview many years ago: 'Husband and wife failed, but mother and father didn't.' My ethics are high because my parents did a great job."

== As subject of songs ==
Sara Dylan is said to have inspired several songs by Dylan, and two have been directly linked to her. "Sad Eyed Lady of the Lowlands," the only song on the fourth side of the 1966 album Blonde on Blonde, was described by critic Robert Shelton as "virtually a wedding song for the former Sara Shirley N. Lownds".

In "Sara" from the 1976 album Desire, Dylan calls her a "radiant jewel, mystical wife". Shelton writes that with this song, "Dylan seems to be making an unabashed confessional to his wife. A plea for forgiveness and understanding." Noting the autobiographical reference in the song to "drinkin' white rum in a Portugal bar" Shelton connects this line with a trip Dylan made to Portugal with Sara in 1965. In "Sara," Dylan seems to acknowledge his wife as the inspiration for "Sad Eyed Lady":

I can still hear the sound of the Methodist bells
I had taken the cure and had just gotten through
staying up for days in the Chelsea Hotel
writing "Sad Eyed Lady of the Lowlands" for you

Jacques Levy, who co-wrote many songs on Desire, has recalled how Dylan and Sara were estranged when he recorded this song in July 1975. Sara happened to visit the studio that evening and Dylan "sang 'Sara' to his wife as she watched from the other side of the glass... It was extraordinary. You could have heard a pin drop. She was absolutely stunned by it," said Levy. According to Larry Sloman, Dylan turned to Sara just before beginning the song, and stated, "This one's for you."

The songs on Dylan's 1975 album Blood on the Tracks have been described by several of Dylan's biographers and critics as arising from the tension as his marriage to Sara collapsed. The album was recorded soon after the couple's initial separation. Dylan biographers Robert Shelton and Clinton Heylin have cautioned against interpreting the album as naked autobiography, arguing that Blood on the Tracks works on many levels—musical, spiritual, poetic—as well as a personal confession. Dylan himself denied at the time of the album's release that Blood on the Tracks was autobiographical, but Jakob Dylan has said, "When I'm listening to 'Subterranean Homesick Blues' I'm grooving along just like you. But when I'm listening to Blood On The Tracks, that's about my parents."

Heylin has quoted Steven Soles saying that, in 1977, Dylan came over unannounced to his apartment and played him ten or twelve songs that were "very dark, very intense" dealing with his bitterness over the divorce. Soles adds that none of these songs were ever recorded.

In addition to Blonde on Blonde, Blood on the Tracks, and Desire, some critics have suggested Sara Dylan is the inspiration for other works. Both Clinton Heylin and Andy Gill have connected Sara to "Love Minus Zero/No Limit" recorded in January 1965. Gill writes that this song expresses admiration for Sara's "Zen-like equanimity: unlike most of the women he met, she wasn't out to impress him or interrogate him about his lyrics." Heylin also credits Sara Dylan as the inspiration for "She Belongs to Me" (from 1965's Bringing It All Back Home) and "Abandoned Love" (recorded during the Desire sessions, but not released until the Biograph box set in 1985). Anne Margaret Daniel has noted that "Abandoned Love" was at one time entitled "Sara Part II Abandoned Love."

== In pop culture ==
A fictional portrayal of Sara's marriage to Dylan is featured in Todd Haynes' 2007 Bob Dylan biopic I'm Not There, in which Heath Ledger plays Robbie Clarke, a personification of Dylan as an actor, and Charlotte Gainsbourg plays Claire, a character based on a combination of Sara Dylan and Suze Rotolo.
