= Bruce Langhorne =

American folk musician (1938–2017)

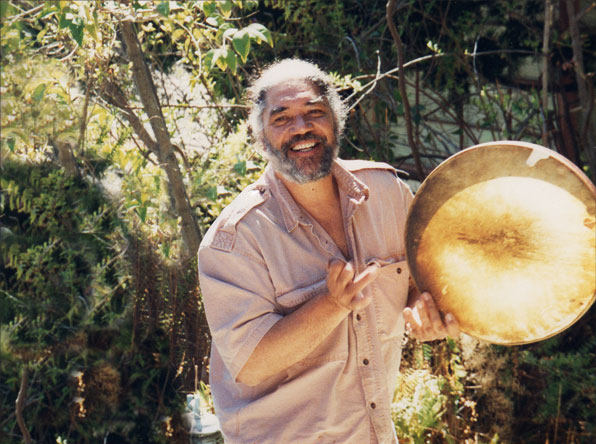

Background information
- Born: May 11, 1938; Tallahassee, Florida, U.S.
- Died: April 14, 2017 (aged 78) Venice, California, U.S.
- Genre: Folk music
- Occupation: Musician
- Instruments: Guitar, percussion

Bruce Langhorne (May 11, 1938 – April 14, 2017) was an American folk musician. He was active in the Greenwich Village folk scene in the 1960s, primarily as a session guitarist for folk albums and performances.

== Biography ==
=== Early life ===
Langhorne was born in Tallahassee, Florida, where his father taught at the Florida Agriculture and Mechanical College for Negroes. From the age of four, he lived with his mother at 555 Edgecombe Avenue, in New York City. 555, or the 'nickel' as it was called, was a premier Sugar Hill residence of Black notables such as Joe Louis, Ted Shearer, Count Basie, Lena Horne, Teddy Wilson, Paul Robeson and Charles Alston. Bruce studied violin, but lost most of three fingers of his right hand when lighting a homemade rocket. He was then taught a few basic chords by his friend George Nelson Preston (now the contemporary artist). Within less than a week Langhorne had mastered several guitar techniques. When they were eighteen years of age, Preston persuaded him to become a summer camp councilor at the leftist Camp Woodland in Phoenicia, New york where folk music was a specialty. It was there that Langhorne met Pete Seeger and Babatunde Olatunji. Bruce was expelled from Horace Mann Prep School, and later claimed that as a teenager he was involved in a stabbing, following which he lived for two years in Mexico. He started playing guitar at the age of 17, and the loss of his fingers contributed to his distinctive playing style.

=== Early career in Greenwich Village ===
He began accompanying folk singer Brother John Sellers at clubs in Greenwich Village and soon started working with other musicians. Langhorne worked with many of the major performers in the folk revival of the 1950s and 1960s, including The Clancy Brothers & Tommy Makem, Joan Baez, Richie Havens, Carolyn Hester, Judy Collins, Peter LaFarge, Gordon Lightfoot, Hugh Masekela, Odetta, Babatunde Olatunji, Peter, Paul and Mary, Richard and Mimi Fariña, Tom Rush, Steve Gillette, and Buffy Sainte-Marie. He first recorded in 1961 with Carolyn Hester which is when he met Bob Dylan. He later said of Dylan: "I thought he was a terrible singer and a complete fake, and I thought he didn't play harmonica that well.... I didn't really start to appreciate Bobby as something unique until he started writing." In 1963, he accompanied Dylan on The Freewheelin' Bob Dylan, and in 1965 he was one of several guitarists on the album Bringing It All Back Home.

=== Mr. Tambourine Man ===
The title character of Bob Dylan's song "Mr. Tambourine Man" was probably inspired by Langhorne, who used to play a large Turkish frame drum in performances and recordings. The drum, which Langhorne purchased in a music store in Greenwich Village, had small bells attached around its interior, giving it a jingling sound much like a tambourine. Langhorne used the instrument most prominently on recordings by Richard and Mimi Fariña. The drum is now in the collection of the Bob Dylan Center in Tulsa.

=== Work with Bob Dylan ===
In addition to likely inspiring the title character of "Mr. Tambourine Man", Langhorne played the electric guitar countermelody on the song. His guitar is also prominent on several other songs on Dylan's Bringing It All Back Home album, particularly "Love Minus Zero/No Limit" and "She Belongs to Me"; he also played the lead guitar parts on "Subterranean Homesick Blues", "Outlaw Blues", "Bob Dylan's 115th Dream" and "Maggie's Farm". He also played the guitar for Dylan's television performances of "It's Alright, Ma (I'm Only Bleeding)" and "It's All Over Now, Baby Blue" on The Les Crane Show in February 1965, a month after the Bringing It All Back Home sessions. Two years earlier, Langhorne performed on "Corrina, Corrina", on the album The Freewheelin' Bob Dylan, and on the outtake "Mixed-Up Confusion", which was eventually released on Biograph. Years later, Langhorne played on tracks for Dylan's album Pat Garrett and Billy the Kid.

=== Movie music composer ===
Langhorne composed the music for the Peter Fonda western film The Hired Hand (1971), which combined sitar, fiddle, and banjo. He also provided the scores for Fonda's 1973 science fiction film Idaho Transfer and his 1976 vigilante movie Fighting Mad which Jonathan Demme directed. Other films featuring Langhorne's scores include Stay Hungry (1976), Melvin and Howard (1980) and Night Warning (1982).

Late Life

In 1992, Langhorne founded a hot-sauce company, Brother Bru-Bru's African Hot Sauce. The hot sauce is unique for containing "African spices" and all natural or organic, no sodium or low sodium ingredients.

Langhorne founded the Venice Beach Marching Society in the earlly 2000's. Singers in the Society included Suzy Williams, Kathy Leonardo, and Erica Kazin.

Langhorne suffered a debilitating stroke in 2006 but was able to live at home, surrounded by loved ones, until his death from kidney failure on April 14, 2017, in Venice, California
