= Highway 61 Revisited =

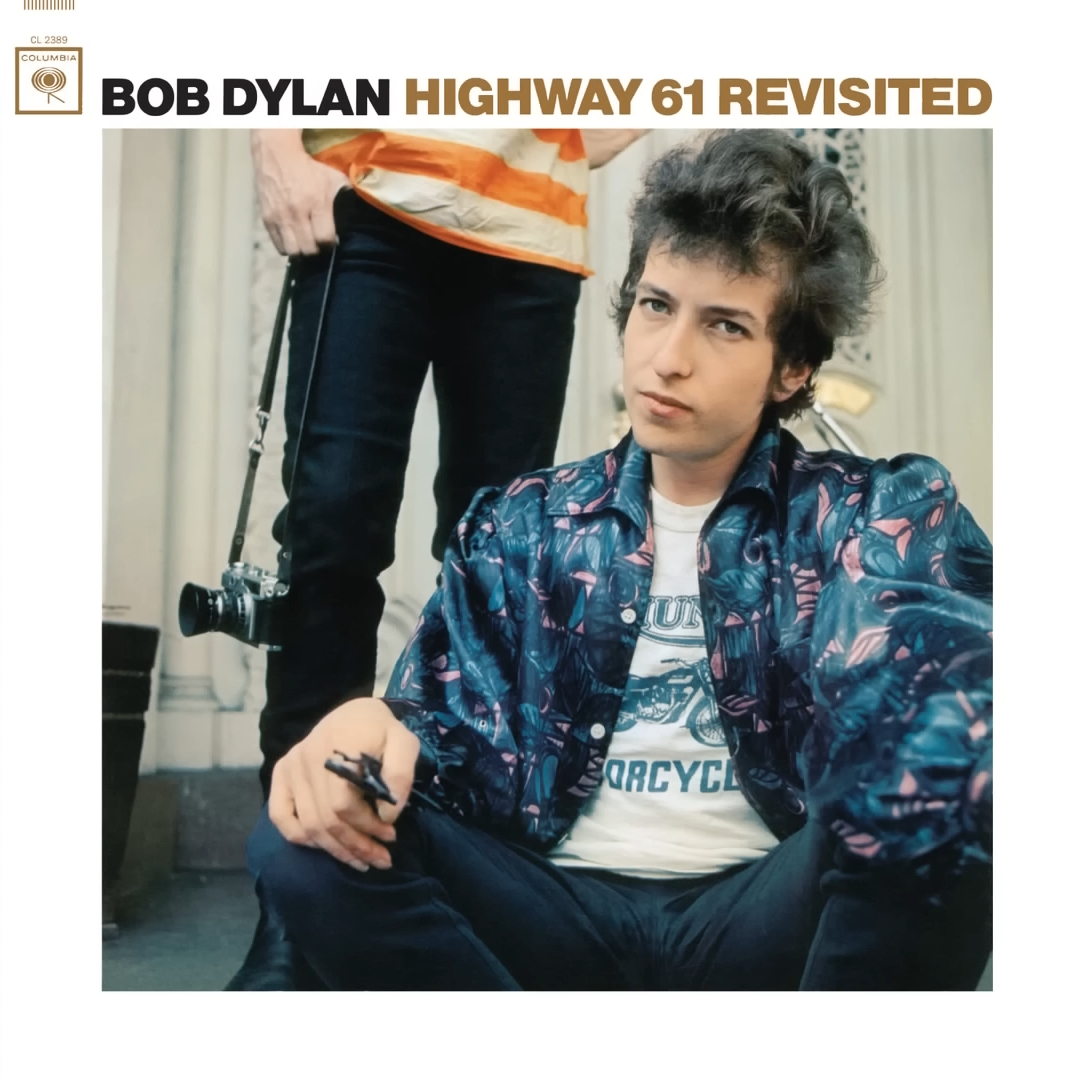

Studio album by Bob Dylan
- Released: August 30, 1965
- Recorded: June 16 – August 4, 1965
- Studios: Columbia Studio A, New York City
- Genres: Folk rock; blues rock; rock and roll
- Length: 51:26
- Label: Columbia
- Producers: Bob Johnston; Tom Wilson

Bob Dylan chronology
Bringing It All Back Home (1965)	Highway 61 Revisited (1965)	Blonde on Blonde (1966)

Singles from Highway 61 Revisited
- 1. "Like a Rolling Stone" Released: July 20, 1965

Highway 61 Revisited is the sixth studio album by the American singer-songwriter Bob Dylan, released on August 30, 1965, by Columbia Records. Dylan continued the musical approach of his previous album Bringing It All Back Home (1965), using rock musicians as his backing band on every track of the album in a further departure from his initial acoustic folk sound, except for the closing track, the 11-minute ballad "Desolation Row". Critics have focused on Dylan's innovative use of driving, blues-based music and subtle poetry to create songs that captured the political and cultural climate of contemporary America. Author Michael Gray argued that, in an important sense, the 1960s "started" with this album.

Led off by "Like a Rolling Stone", a hit single released ahead of the album, Highway 61 Revisited includes songs that Dylan has continued to perform live over his long career, including "Ballad of a Thin Man" and the title track. He named the album after the major American highway that connected his birthplace of Duluth, Minnesota, to southern cities famed for their musical heritage, including St. Louis, Memphis, New Orleans, and the Delta blues area of Mississippi.

Highway 61 Revisited peaked at No. 3 on the US Billboard Top LPs chart and No. 4 on the UK Albums Chart. Positively received on release, the album has since been described as one of Dylan's best works and among the greatest albums of all time. It ranked No. 4 on Rolling Stone's "The 500 Greatest Albums of All Time" list in 2003 and No. 18 in the 2020 revision. It was voted No. 26 in the third edition of Colin Larkin's All Time Top 1000 Albums (2000) and was featured in Robert Dimery's 1001 Albums You Must Hear Before You Die (2010). "Like a Rolling Stone" was a top-10 hit in several countries, and was listed at No. 4 on Rolling Stone's "The 500 Greatest Songs of All Time" list in 2021, after being placed at No. 1 in the 2004 and 2010 lists. Two other songs, "Desolation Row" and the title track, were ranked No. 187 and No. 373 on the 2010 list.

== Dylan and Highway 61 ==
In his memoir Chronicles: Volume One, Dylan described the kinship he felt with the route that supplied the title of his sixth album: "Highway 61, the main thoroughfare of the country blues, begins about where I began. I always felt like I'd started on it, always had been on it and could go anywhere, even down in to the deep Delta country. It was the same road, full of the same contradictions, the same one-horse towns, the same spiritual ancestors ... It was my place in the universe, always felt like it was in my blood."

When he was growing up in the 1950s, U.S. Highway 61 stretched from the Canada–United States border in far northeast Minnesota (redesignated in 1991 as MN-61), through Duluth, where Dylan was born, along the Mississippi River down to New Orleans. Along the way, the route passed near the birthplaces and homes of influential musicians such as Muddy Waters, Son House, Elvis Presley and Charley Patton. The "empress of the blues", Bessie Smith, died after sustaining serious injuries in an automobile accident on Highway 61. Critic Mark Polizzotti points out that blues legend Robert Johnson is alleged to have sold his soul to the devil at the highway's crossroads with Route 49. The highway had also been the subject of several blues recordings, notably Roosevelt Sykes' "Highway 61 Blues" (1932) and Mississippi Fred McDowell's "61 Highway" (1964).

Dylan said he had to overcome resistance at Columbia Records to give the album its title. He told biographer Robert Shelton: "I wanted to call that album Highway 61 Revisited. Nobody understood it. I had to go up the fucking ladder until finally the word came down and said: 'Let him call it what he wants to call it'." Michael Gray said the album's title represents Dylan's insistence that his songs are rooted in the blues: "Indeed the album title Highway 61 Revisited announces that we are in for a long revisit, since it is such a long, blues-travelled highway. Many bluesmen had been there before [Dylan], all recording versions of a blues called 'Highway 61'."

== Recording ==
=== Background ===
In May 1965, Dylan returned from his tour of England feeling exhausted and dissatisfied with his material. He told journalist Nat Hentoff: "I was going to quit singing. I was very drained" and added, "[i]t's very tiring having other people tell you how much they dig you if you yourself don't dig you."

As a consequence of his dissatisfaction, Dylan wrote 20 pages of verse he later described as a "long piece of vomit". He reduced this to a song with four verses and a chorus—"Like a Rolling Stone". He told Hentoff that writing and recording the song washed away his dissatisfaction, and restored his enthusiasm for creating music. Describing the experience to Robert Hilburn in 2004, nearly 40 years later, Dylan said: "It's like a ghost is writing a song like that ... You don't know what it means except the ghost picked me to write the song."

Highway 61 Revisited was recorded in two blocks of recording sessions that took place in Columbia's Studio A, located on Seventh Avenue in Midtown Manhattan. The first block, June 15 and 16, was produced by Tom Wilson and resulted in the single "Like a Rolling Stone". On July 25, Dylan performed his controversial electric set at the Newport Folk Festival, where some of the crowd booed his performance. Four days after Newport, Dylan returned to the recording studio. From July 29 to August 4, he and his band completed recording Highway 61 Revisited, but under the supervision of a new producer, Bob Johnston.

=== Recording sessions, June 15–16 ===
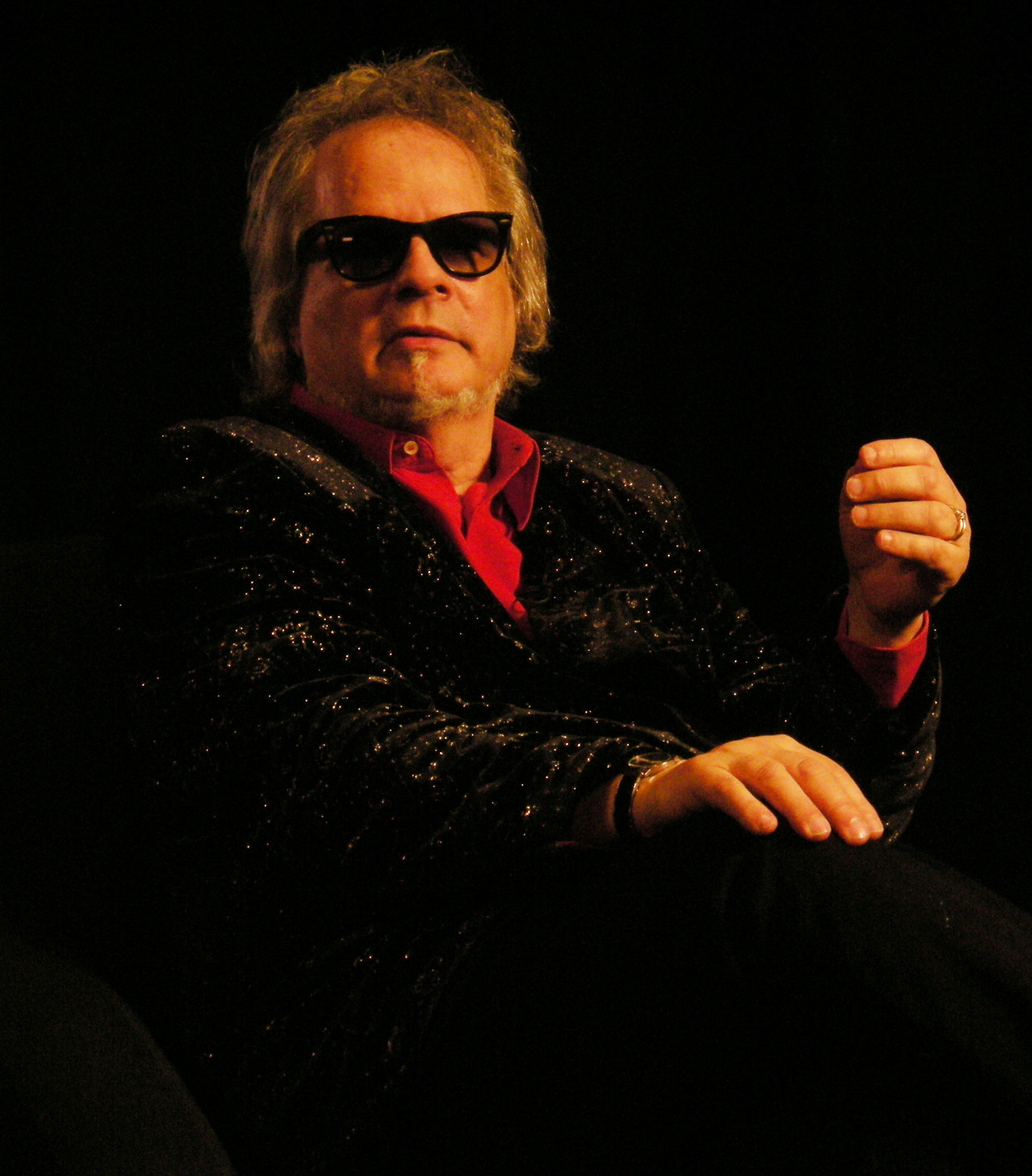
Al Kooper's improvised organ riff on "Like a Rolling Stone" has been described as "one of the great moments of pop music serendipity".

In the first recording session on June 15 Dylan was backed by Bobby Gregg on drums, Joe Macho Jr. on bass, Paul Griffin on piano, and Frank Owens on guitar. For lead guitar, the singer recruited Michael Bloomfield of the Paul Butterfield Blues Band. The musicians began the session by recording a fast version of "It Takes a Lot to Laugh, It Takes a Train to Cry" and the song "Sitting on a Barbed Wire Fence", which was omitted from the album. Dylan and the musicians next attempted to record "Like a Rolling Stone"; at this early stage, Dylan's piano dominated the backing, which was in 3/4 time. "Sitting on a Barbed Wire Fence", the fast version of "It Takes a Lot to Laugh", and an early take of "Like a Rolling Stone" were eventually released on The Bootleg Series Volumes 1–3 (Rare & Unreleased) 1961–1991.

The musicians returned to Studio A the following day, when they devoted almost the entire session to recording "Like a Rolling Stone". Present on this occasion was Al Kooper, a young musician invited by Wilson to observe, but who wanted to play on the session. Kooper managed to sit in on the session; despite never having played electric organ before, Kooper improvised an organ riff that, critics such as Greil Marcus and Mark Polizzotti have argued, is a crucial element of the recording. The fourth take was ultimately selected as the master, but Dylan and the band recorded eleven more takes.

=== Recording sessions, July 29 – August 4 ===
To create the material for Highway 61 Revisited, Dylan spent a month writing in his new home in the Byrdcliffe artists' colony of Woodstock in upstate New York. When he returned to Studio A on July 29, he was backed by the same musicians, except Harvey Brooks replaced Joe Macho on bass and his producer had changed from Tom Wilson to Bob Johnston. (Note: Polizzotti writes that Wilson and Dylan had a falling out during the recording of "Like a Rolling Stone", perhaps over the prominence of Kooper's organ in the mix. (Polizzotti 2006, p. 78) When questioned by Jann Wenner in 1969 about the switch in producers, Dylan gave a deadpan answer: "All I know is that I was out recording one day, and Tom had always been there—I had no reason to think he wasn't going to be there—and I looked up one day, and Bob was there [laughs]." (Wenner, Jann. "Interview with Jann S. Wenner", Rolling Stone, November 29, 1969, in Cott 2006, p. 142))

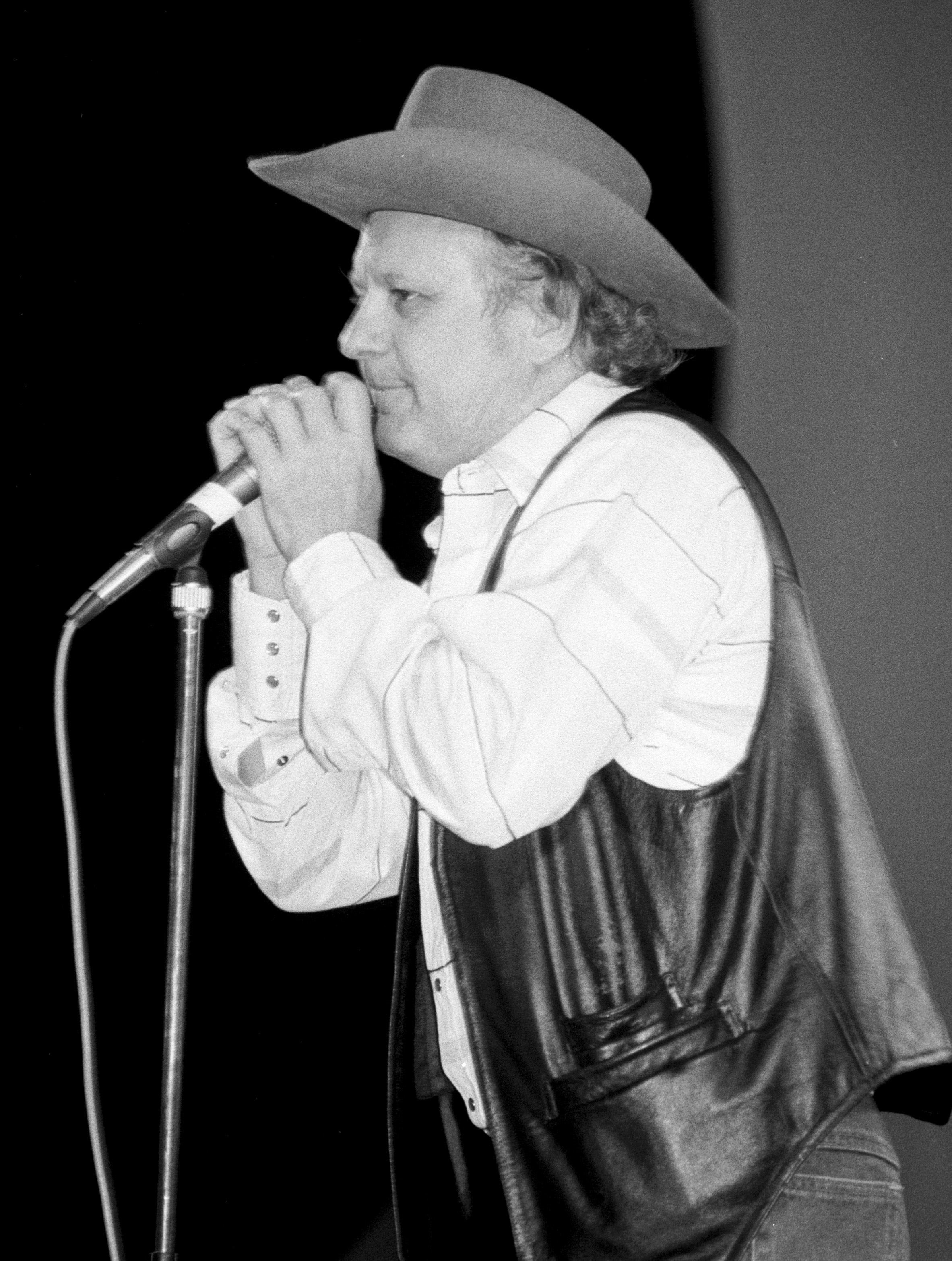
Nashville sessions musician Charlie McCoy's chance visit to New York resulted in the guitar flourishes accompanying "Desolation Row", the last track on the album.

Their first session together was devoted to three songs. After recording several takes each of "Tombstone Blues", "It Takes a Lot to Laugh" and "Positively 4th Street", masters were successfully recorded. "Tombstone Blues" and "It Takes a Lot to Laugh" were included in the final album, but "Positively 4th Street" was issued as a single-only release. At the close of the July 29 session, Dylan attempted to record "Desolation Row", accompanied by Al Kooper on electric guitar and Harvey Brooks on bass. There was no drummer, as the drummer had gone home. This electric version was eventually released in 2005, on The Bootleg Series Vol. 7.

On July 30, Dylan and his band returned to Studio A and recorded three songs. A master take of "From a Buick 6" was recorded and later included on the final album, but most of the session was devoted to "Can You Please Crawl Out Your Window?" Dylan was unsatisfied with the results and set the song aside for a later date; it was eventually re-recorded with the Hawks in October.

After Dylan and Kooper spent the weekend in Woodstock writing chord charts for the songs, sessions resumed at Studio A on August 2. "Highway 61 Revisited", "Just Like Tom Thumb's Blues", "Queen Jane Approximately", and "Ballad of a Thin Man" were recorded successfully and masters were selected for the album.

One final session was held on August 4, again at Studio A. Most of the session was devoted to completing "Desolation Row". Johnston has related that Nashville musician Charlie McCoy was visiting New York, and he invited McCoy to play guitar at the session. According to some sources, seven takes of "Desolation Row" were recorded, and takes six and seven were spliced together for the master recording.

The resulting album, Highway 61 Revisited, has been described as "Dylan's first purely 'rock' album", a realization of his wish to leave his old music format behind and move on from his all-acoustic first four albums and half-acoustic, half-electric fifth album, Bringing It All Back Home. Documentary director D. A. Pennebaker, who filmed Dylan on his acoustic UK tour in May 1965, has said: "I didn't know that he was going to leave acoustic. I did know that he was getting a little dragged by it."

== Songs ==
=== Side one ===
==== "Like a Rolling Stone" ====
"Like a Rolling Stone"
In 2004, Rolling Stone magazine ranked "Like a Rolling Stone" as "the greatest song of all time", and noted "the impressionist voltage of Dylan's language, the intensely personal accusation in his voice ('Ho-o-o-ow does it fe-e-e-el?')" and "the apocalyptic charge of Kooper's garage-gospel organ".

Highway 61 Revisited opens with "Like a Rolling Stone", which has been described as revolutionary in its combination of electric guitar licks, organ chords, and Dylan's voice, "at once so young and so snarling ... and so cynical". Michael Gray characterized "Like a Rolling Stone" as "a chaotic amalgam of blues, impressionism, allegory, and an intense directness: 'How does it feel?'" Polizzotti says the composition is notable for eschewing traditional themes of popular music, such as romance, instead expressing resentment and a yearning for revenge. It was suggested that Miss Lonely, the song's central character, is based on Edie Sedgwick, a socialite and actress in the Factory scene of pop artist Andy Warhol. Critic Mike Marqusee said the composition was "surely a Dylan cameo", and that its poignancy becomes apparent upon realizing that "it is sung, at least in part, to the singer himself: he's the one 'with no direction home'." "Like A Rolling Stone" reached number two in the Billboard Hot 100 in the summer of 1965, and was a top-10 hit in Australia, Canada, the Netherlands, New Zealand, and the United Kingdom.

==== "Tombstone Blues" ====
The fast-paced, two-chord blues song "Tombstone Blues", driven by Michael Bloomfield's lead guitar, uses a parade of historical characters—outlaw Belle Starr, biblical temptress Delilah, Jack the Ripper (represented in this song as a successful businessman), John the Baptist (described here as a torturer), and blues singer Ma Rainey who Dylan humorously suggests shared a sleeping bag with composer Beethoven—to sketch an absurdist account of contemporary America. Although other interpretations could be put forth: Where once the creativity embodied in the accomplishments of Ma Rainey and Beethoven flourished, now there is stultification of patriotic martial music. For critics Mark Polizzotti and Andy Gill, the reality behind the song is the then-escalating Vietnam War; both writers hear the "king of the Philistines" who sends his slaves "out to the jungle" as a reference to President Lyndon B. Johnson.

==== "It Takes a Lot to Laugh, It Takes a Train to Cry" ====
"It Takes a Lot to Laugh, It Takes a Train to Cry"
According to critic Andy Gill, "It Takes A Lot To Laugh" illustrates Dylan's creativity, both in the way it adapts an old blues song, and in the way Dylan recorded two radically different versions of the song: the first, fast and guitar-driven; in his second version, released on Highway 61, Dylan transformed the song into a "slow, loping, piano-based blues".

On July 29, 1965, Dylan and his band resumed recording "It Takes a Lot to Laugh, It Takes a Train to Cry". Tony Glover, who observed the recording session, has recalled that Dylan re-worked the song at the piano while the other musicians took a lunch break. Critic Sean Egan writes that by slowing down the tempo, Dylan transformed the song from an "insufferably smart-alec number into a slow, tender, sensual anthem". Gill points out that the lyrics reveal the singer's talent for borrowing from old blues numbers, adapting the lines "Don't the clouds look lonesome shining across the sea/ Don't my gal look good when she's coming after me" from "Solid Road" by bluesmen Brownie McGhee and Leroy Carr.

==== "From a Buick 6" ====
AllMusic critic Bill Janovitz describes "From a Buick 6" as a "raucous, up-tempo blues", which is played "almost recklessly". The song opens with a snare shot similar to the beginning of "Like a Rolling Stone". Partially based on Sleepy John Estes' 1930 song "Milk Cow Blues", the guitar part is patterned after older blues riffs by Robert Johnson, Charlie Patton and Big Joe Williams. Robert Shelton hears the song as "an earthy tribute to another funky earth-mother", while for Heylin it is close to filler material; he argues that only through the musicians' performance is Dylan able to "convince us he is doing more than just listing the number of ways in which this 'graveyard woman' is both a lifesaver and a death-giver".

==== "Ballad of a Thin Man" ====
"Ballad of a Thin Man" is driven by Dylan's piano, which contrasts with "the spooky organ riffs" played by Al Kooper. Marqusee describes the song as one of "the purest songs of protest ever sung", as it looks at the media and its inability to understand both the singer and his work. He writes that the song became the anthem of an in-group, "disgusted by the old, excited by the new ... elated by their discovery of others who shared their feelings", with its refrain "Something is happening here/ But you don't know what it is/ Do you, Mr Jones?" epitomizing the "hip exclusivity" of the burgeoning counterculture. Robert Shelton describes the song's central character, Mr Jones, as "one of Dylan's greatest archetypes", characterizing him as "a Philistine ... superficially educated and well bred but not very smart about the things that count".

=== Side two ===
==== "Queen Jane Approximately" ====
Polizzotti, in his study of Highway 61 Revisited, writes that the opening track of Side Two, "Queen Jane Approximately" is in a similar vein to "Like a Rolling Stone", but the song offers "a touch of sympathy and even comfort in place of relentless mockery". The song is structured as a series of ABAB quatrain verses, with each verse followed by a chorus that is simply a repeat of the last line of each verse: "Won't you come see me Queen Jane?". Gill calls this song "the least interesting track" on Highway 61, but praises the piano ascending the scale during the harmonica break as an evocation of "the stifling nature of an upper class existence". Others have speculated that the song is directed at Joan Baez and the folk movement, which Dylan had largely left behind. "Queen Jane Approximately" was released as the B-side of Dylan's "One of Us Must Know (Sooner or Later)" single in early 1966.

==== "Highway 61 Revisited" ====
Dylan commences the title song of his album, "Highway 61 Revisited", with the words "Oh God said to Abraham, 'Kill me a son'/Abe says, 'Man, you must be puttin' me on'". As Gill has pointed out, Abraham was the name of Dylan's father, which makes the singer the son whom God wants killed. Gill comments that it is befitting that this song, celebrating a highway central to the history of the blues, is a "raucous blues boogie". He notes that the scope of the song broadens to make the highway a road of endless possibilities, peopled by dubious characters and culminating in a promoter who "seriously considers staging World War III out on Highway 61". The song is punctuated by the sound of a siren whistle, credited as "Police Car" to Dylan in the album liner notes. "Highway 61 Revisited" was released as the B-side of his "Can You Please Crawl Out Your Window?" single on November 30, 1965.

==== "Just Like Tom Thumb's Blues" ====
"Just Like Tom Thumb's Blues" has six verses and no chorus. The lyrics describe a nightmarish experience in Juarez, Mexico, where, in Shelton's words, "our anti-hero stumbles amid sickness, despair, whores and saints." He battles with corrupt authorities, alcohol and drugs before resolving to return to New York City. In this song, critics have heard literary references to Malcolm Lowry's Under the Volcano, Edgar Allan Poe's "The Murders in the Rue Morgue" and Jack Kerouac's Desolation Angels. The backing musicians, Bobby Gregg on drums, Mike Bloomfield on electric guitar, and two pianists, Paul Griffin on tack piano and Al Kooper on Hohner Pianet, produce a mood that, for Gill, perfectly complements the "enervated tone" of the lyrics. Heylin notes that Dylan took great care—sixteen takes—to get the effect he was after, with lyrics that subtly "[skirt] the edge of reason".

==== "Desolation Row" ====
"Desolation Row"
Featuring a "courtly, flamenco-tinged guitar backing", it has been suggested that in "Desolation Row", Dylan combined the cultural chaos of mid-1960s America with sepia-tinged TV westerns he remembered from his youth, such as Rawhide and Gunsmoke.

Dylan concludes Highway 61 Revisited with the sole acoustic exception to his rock album. Gill has characterized "Desolation Row" as "an 11-minute epic of entropy, which takes the form of a Fellini-esque parade of grotesques and oddities featuring a huge cast of iconic characters". These include historical celebrities such as Albert Einstein and Nero, the biblical characters Noah and Cain and Abel, the Shakespearean figures of Ophelia and Romeo, ending with literary titans T.S. Eliot and Ezra Pound. The song opens with a report that "they're selling postcards of the hanging", and adds "the circus is in town". Polizzotti connects this song with the lynching of three black circus workers in Duluth, Minnesota, which was Dylan's birthplace, and describes "Desolation Row" as a cowboy song, "the 'Home On The Range' of the frightening territory that was mid-sixties America". In the penultimate verse, the passengers on the Titanic are shouting "Which Side Are You On?" Shelton suggests Dylan is asking, "What difference which side you're on if you're sailing on the Titanic?" and is thus satirizing "simpleminded political commitment".

=== Outtakes and The Cutting Edge ===
The first non-album outtake from the Highway 61 Revisited sessions to be released was the single "Positively 4th Street", although on an early pressing of the single Columbia used another Highway 61 outtake, "Can You Please Crawl Out Your Window?", by mistake. "Crawl Out Your Window" was subsequently re-recorded with the Hawks in October, and released as a single in November 1965. Columbia accidentally released an alternate take of "From a Buick 6" on an early pressing of Highway 61 Revisited, and this version continued to appear on the Japanese release for several years. Other outtakes officially released between 1991 and 2005 include alternate takes of "Like a Rolling Stone" and "It Takes a Lot to Laugh, It Takes a Train to Cry", and a previously unreleased song, "Sitting on a Barbed Wire Fence", on The Bootleg Series Volumes 1–3 (Rare & Unreleased) 1961–1991, as well as alternate takes of "Desolation Row", "Highway 61 Revisited", "Just Like Tom Thumb's Blues", "Tombstone Blues", and "It Takes a Lot to Laugh, It Takes a Train to Cry" on The Bootleg Series Volume 7. Excerpts from several different takes of "Like a Rolling Stone" appeared on the Highway 61 Interactive CD-ROM, released in February 1995.

In 2015, Dylan released Volume 12 of his Bootleg Series, The Cutting Edge, in three different formats. The 18-disc Collector's Edition was described as including "every note recorded during the 1965–1966 sessions, every alternate take and alternate lyric". The 18 CDs contain every take of every song recorded in the studio during the Highway 61 Revisited sessions, from June 15 to August 4, 1965.

The Highway 61 Revisited out-takes from the first recording session in New York, June 15 and 16, 1965 comprise: ten takes of "It Takes a Lot to Laugh, It Takes a Train to Cry", six takes of "Sitting on a Barbed-Wire Fence", and fifteen takes of "Like a Rolling Stone". Additionally, The Cutting Edge contains four instrumental "stem" tracks, lifted from Take Four which was the released "Master take" of "Like A Rolling Stone": Guitar (Mike Bloomfield); vocal, guitar (Bob Dylan), piano and bass; drums and organ.

The tracks from the second recording session in New York, July 29 to August 4, 1965, comprise seven takes of "It Takes a Lot to Laugh, It Takes a Train to Cry", sixteen takes of "Tombstone Blues", twelve takes of "Positively Fourth Street", five takes of "From A Buick 6", seventeen takes of "Can You Please Crawl Out Your Window?", nine takes of "Highway 61 Revisited", sixteen takes of "Just Like Tom Thumb's Blues", seven takes of Queen Jane Approximately", and eight takes of "Desolation Row".

Describing the process of listening to these many alternative versions, Chris Gerard wrote in PopMatters: "The fact that these versions do not approach the greatness of the final recordings is exactly the point. These are works in progress. It’s a guided tour through the creative process that led to these landmark albums."

== Artwork and packaging ==
The cover artwork was photographed by Daniel Kramer several weeks before the recording sessions. Kramer captured Dylan sitting on the stoop of the apartment of his manager, Albert Grossman, located in Gramercy Park, New York, placing Dylan's friend Bob Neuwirth behind Dylan "to give it extra color". Only the lower half of Neuwirth is visible and he holds a Nikon SP camera. Dylan wears a Triumph motorcycle T-shirt under a blue and purple silk shirt, holding his Ray-Ban sunglasses in his right hand. Photographer Kramer commented in 2010 on the singer's expression: "He's hostile, or it's a hostile moodiness. He's almost challenging me or you or whoever's looking at it: 'What are you gonna do about it, buster?'"

As he had on his previous three albums, Dylan contributed his own writing to the back cover of Highway 61 Revisited, in the shape of freeform, surrealist prose: "On the slow train time does not interfere & at the Arabian crossing waits White Heap, the man from the newspaper & behind him the hundred inevitables made of solid rock & stone." One critic has pointed out the close similarity of these notes to the stream of consciousness, experimental novel Tarantula, which Dylan was writing during 1965 and 1966.

== Reception and legacy ==
Retrospective professional reviews
Review scores
Source	Rating
AllMusic	5/5 stars
Chicago Tribune	4/4 stars
Encyclopedia of Popular Music	5/5 stars
Entertainment Weekly	A+
The Great Rock Discography	10/10
Music Story	5/5 stars
MusicHound Rock	5/5
The Rolling Stone Album Guide	5/5 stars
Sputnikmusic	5/5
Tom Hull	A

In the British music press, initial reviews of Highway 61 expressed both bafflement and admiration for the record. New Musical Express critic Allen Evans wrote: "Another set of message songs and story songs sung in that monotonous and tuneless way by Dylan which becomes quite arresting as you listen." The Melody Maker LP review section, by an anonymous critic, commented: "Bob Dylan's sixth LP, like all others, is fairly incomprehensible but nevertheless an absolute knock-out." The English poet Philip Larkin, reviewing the album for The Daily Telegraph, wrote that he found himself "well rewarded" by the record: "Dylan's cawing, derisive voice is probably well suited to his material ... and his guitar adapts itself to rock ('Highway 61') and ballad ('Queen Jane'). There is a marathon 'Desolation Row' which has an enchanting tune and mysterious, possibly half-baked words."

In September 1965, the American trade journal Billboard also praised the album, and predicted big sales for it: "Based upon his singles hit 'Like a Rolling Stone', Dylan has a top-of-the-chart-winner in this package of his off-beat, commercial material." The album peaked at number three on the US Billboard Top LPs chart of top albums, and number four on the UK albums charts. In the US, Highway 61 was certificated as a gold record in August 1967, and platinum in August 1997. For Stereo Review in March 1969, Robert Christgau included Highway 61 Revisited in his piece "A Short and Happy History of Rock", comprising his recommended rock "library" of 25 albums. On its merits, he said Dylan showed good taste in accompanying musicians, but his style of rock "had a loose feel, almost tacked on, in contrast to the tight arrangements which had become typical." Despite observing flaws in the music and lyrics, he concluded that both are "great" and "healthy". Of the music's impact up to that point, Christgau added:

When Dylan started writing "poetic" songs in the early Sixties, he inspired a lot of awful verbalizing, but he also inspired a songwriting revival that still flourishes. When he sang rock, he legitimized it in the folk community. The skilled guitarists and demanding fans of that community inevitably raised the quality—if also the pretensions—of the music.

Highway 61 Revisited has remained among the most highly acclaimed of Dylan's works. Biographer Anthony Scaduto praises its rich imagery, and describes it as "one of the most brilliant pop records ever made. As rock, it cuts through to the core of the music—a hard driving beat without frills, without self-consciousness." Michael Gray calls Highway 61 "revolutionary and stunning, not just for its energy and panache but in its vision: fusing radical, electrical music ... with lyrics that were light years ahead of anyone else's; Dylan here unites the force of blues-based rock'n'roll with the power of poetry. The whole rock culture, the whole post-Beatle pop-rock world, and so in an important sense the 1960s started here." In the opinion of PopMatters critic Hank Kalet, the album was the most "electrifying" rock and roll record ever and "one of a handful of albums (including the Beatles' Rubber Soul and Revolver) that gave literate rockers the green light to create a kind of intelligent, probing rock music that had not existed before". "This seminal folk-rock classic" showcased "Dylan's seething, not-quite-out-of-control vocal delivery and a rough-and-tumble instrumental attack", as well as his "transformation from a folk singer to a rock and roller", Sam Sutherland wrote in High Fidelity. Music journalist Gary Graff points to Highway 61 Revisited, along with Dylan's next album Blonde on Blonde (1966) and the Beach Boys' Pet Sounds (1966), as possible starting points to the album era, as they each constituted "a cohesive and conceptual body of work rather than just some hit singles ... with filler tracks."

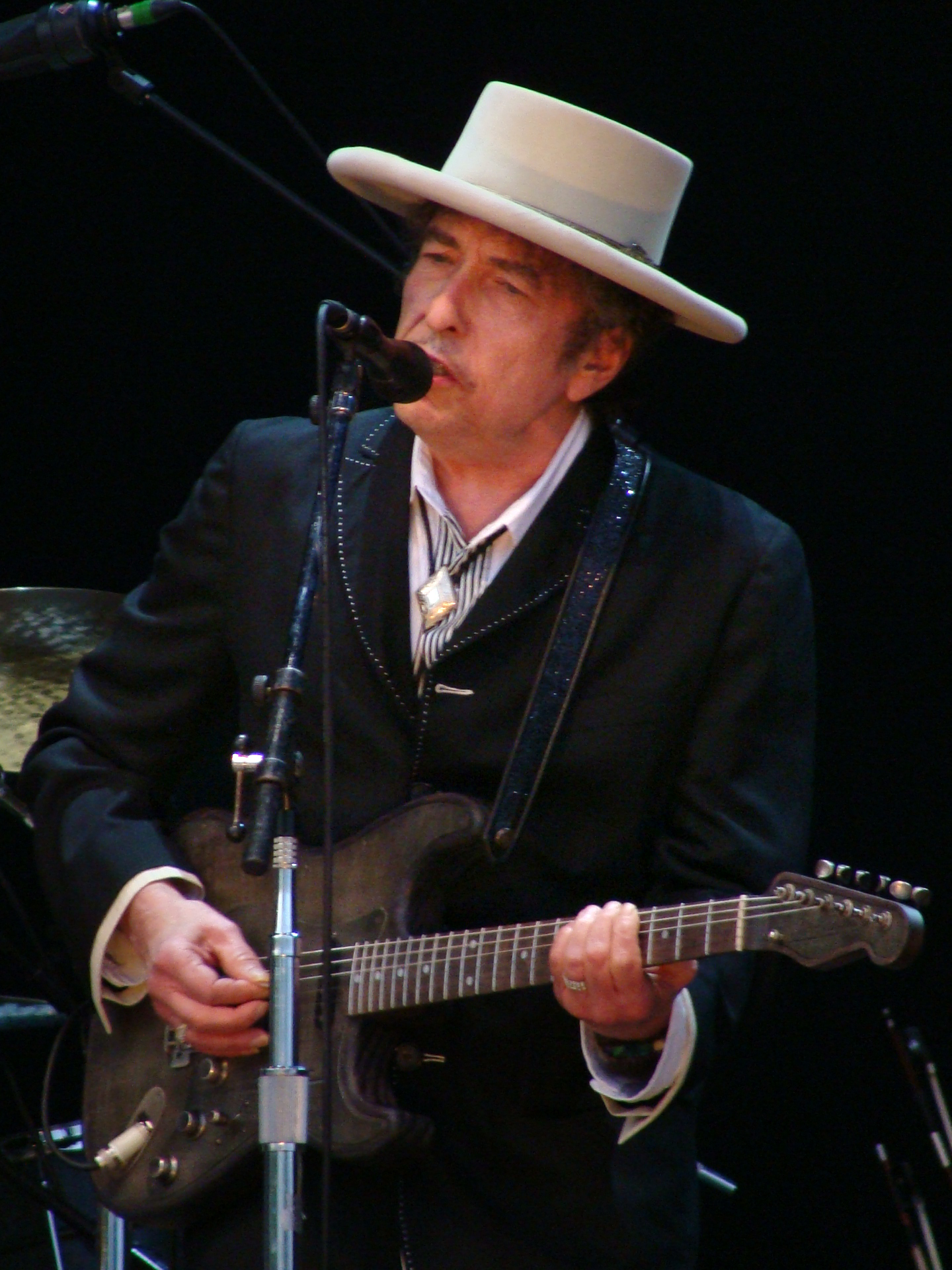
Having toured continuously since the inception of his Never Ending Tour in June 1988, Dylan has performed "Like a Rolling Stone" more than 2,000 times in concert.

Among Dylan's contemporaries, Phil Ochs was impressed by Highway 61, explaining: "It's the kind of music that plants a seed in your mind and then you have to hear it several times. And as you go over it you start to hear more and more things. He's done something that's left the whole field ridiculously in the back of him." In 2003, Rolling Stone magazine described Highway 61 as "one of those albums that changed everything", and placed it at number four in its list of "The 500 Greatest Albums of All Time." It maintained the rating in a 2012 revised list, and was re-ranked at number eighteen in 2020. In 2010, the Rolling Stone list of "The 500 Greatest Songs of All Time" ranked "Highway 61 Revisited", "Desolation Row" and "Like a Rolling Stone" at number 373, number 187, and number one, respectively. In 2021, "Like a Rolling Stone" was re-ranked at number 4, and "Desolation Row" was re-ranked at number 83. In 2012, The Best 100 Albums of All Time book ranked Highway 61 Revisited as the greatest album of all time. The album was included in a "Basic Record Library" of 1950s and 1960s recordings—published in Christgau's Record Guide: Rock Albums of the Seventies (1981)—and in Robert Dimery's 1001 Albums You Must Hear Before You Die. It was voted No. 26 in the third edition of Colin Larkin's All Time Top 1000 Albums (2000). It was inducted into the Grammy Hall of Fame in 2002.

Most of the songs on Highway 61 Revisited have remained important, in varying degrees, to Dylan's live performances since 1965. According to his website, he has played "Like a Rolling Stone" over 2,000 times, "Highway 61 Revisited" more than 1,700 times, "Ballad of a Thin Man" over 1,000 times, and most of the other songs between 150 and 500 times.

The influence of the songs on Highway 61 Revisited can be heard in many cover versions. "Like a Rolling Stone" has been recorded by artists including the Rolling Stones, on their live album Stripped, David Bowie and Mick Ronson on Heaven and Hull, Johnny Winter on Raisin' Cain, and Jimi Hendrix at the Monterey Pop Festival. My Chemical Romance's version of "Desolation Row" was featured in the film Watchmen in 2009. The song has also been covered by the Grateful Dead on their album Postcards of the Hanging. "Just Like Tom Thumb's Blues" has been recorded by Judy Collins, Linda Ronstadt, Nina Simone and Neil Young. The title track was covered by Johnny Winter, PJ Harvey, Karen O and Billy Joel.

== Track listing ==
All tracks are written by Bob Dylan. The timings are for the stereo mix – the mono mix totals nearly 3 minutes less, with most of the difference accounted for by songs 3, 6, and 8.

Side one
No.	Title	Recorded	Length
1.	"Like a Rolling Stone"	June 16, 1965	6:13
2.	"Tombstone Blues"	July 29, 1965	5:56
3.	"It Takes a Lot to Laugh, It Takes a Train to Cry"	July 29, 1965	4:09
4.	"From a Buick 6"	July 30, 1965	3:19
5.	"Ballad of a Thin Man"	August 2, 1965	5:58
Total length:			25:35

Side two
No.	Title	Recorded	Length
1.	"Queen Jane Approximately"	August 2, 1965	5:31
2.	"Highway 61 Revisited"	August 2, 1965	3:30
3.	"Just Like Tom Thumb's Blues"	August 2, 1965	5:32
4.	"Desolation Row"	August 4, 1965	11:21
Total length:			25:54

== Personnel ==
Adapted from the liner notes. (Note: Highway 61 Revisited—Discover: Liner Notes do not list Sam Lay among the personnel, but Heylin 1995, p. 39 does.)

- Bob Dylan – vocals, guitars, harmonica; piano (track 5), Acme siren (track 7)
- Mike Bloomfield – electric guitar
- Charlie McCoy – guitar (track 9)
- Al Kooper – organ, piano
- Paul Griffin – piano, organ
- Frank Owens – piano
- Harvey Brooks – bass guitar
- Russ Savakus – bass guitar; upright bass (track 9)
- Joe Macho Jr. – bass guitar
- Bobby Gregg – drums
- Sam Lay – drums (track 6)
- Bruce Langhorne – tambourine (track 1)

Production

- Bob Johnston – producer
- Tom Wilson – producer ("Like a Rolling Stone")
- Daniel Kramer, Don Hunstein – photography
- Steve Berkowitz – Hybrid SACD reissue production
- Greg Calbi – Hybrid SACD reissue remastering

== Charts ==
Chart (1965–2020)	Peak position
German Albums Chart	28
Greek Albums Chart	2
UK Albums Chart	4
US Billboard Top LPs	3

== Certifications ==
Region	Certification	Certified units/sales
Canada (Music Canada)	Gold	50,000^{^}
United Kingdom (BPI)	Gold	100,000^{^}
United Kingdom (BPI)	Platinum	300,000^{‡}
United States (RIAA)	Platinum	1,000,000^{^}
^{^} Shipments figures based on certification alone.^{‡} Sales+streaming figures based on certification alone.
