= Outlaw Blues (disambiguation) =

Outlaw Blues

- Outlaw Blues 1977 film
- Outlaw Blues, Peter Fonda song written by John Oates for the film, and single
- Outlaw Blues (Bob Dylan song)
