= Sally Grossman =

American music label executive (1939–2021)

- Born: Sally Ann Buehler; August 22, 1939; New York City, U.S.
- Died: March 11, 2021 (aged 81); Woodstock, New York, U.S.
- Known for: Appearance on Bringing It All Back Home cover
- Spouse: Albert Grossman (m. 1964; died 1986)

Sally Ann Grossman (née Buehler; August 22, 1939 – March 11, 2021) was an American model and the wife of Bob Dylan's one-time manager Albert Grossman. According to some Dylan biographers, she introduced Dylan to his first wife Sara (although this claim is disputed by Dylan's stepson, Peter Lownds). She operated the Woodstock-based Bearsville Records following the death of her husband in 1986.

== Early life ==
Grossman was born Sally Ann Buehler in Manhattan on August 22, 1939. Her father worked as an actuary; her mother was the executive director of the Boys Club. She attended Adelphi University and Hunter College, but became more interested in the folk music scene in Greenwich Village. She consequently dropped out of school to work as a waitress in establishments such as Cafe Wha? and The Bitter End.

== Bringing It All Back Home ==
Grossman is best known as the young woman languorously stretched out on the cover of Dylan's 1965 album Bringing It All Back Home. She also appeared briefly in the D.A. Pennebaker documentary, Dont Look Back, which covered Dylan's 1965 concert tour in England. The album photograph came about after Dylan spent the summer writing and recording at the Grossmans' home. Grossman stated in a 1996 interview that she took part because "I was around, and Bob just asked me to do it". The photograph was taken by Daniel Kramer in the Woodstock, New York, home. The chaise longue in the photograph was a wedding gift to the Grossmans from Mary Travers of Peter, Paul and Mary. As for the red jersey dress, Grossman said, "I don't think I've worn it again." Grossman said, "It's amazing to be on an album cover that people remember 30 years later."

== Career ==
In 1971, Grossman provided a voiceover to the documentary film Luxman Baul's Movie, a documentary about two Bengali musicians (Bauls) which was financed by her husband; Sally Grossman was also credited as producer.

After the death of her husband Albert in 1986, Grossman took over the management of Bearsville Records, the record company he founded in 1970, as well as the two restaurants they had established together. She was also responsible for refurbishing his barn and transforming it into Bearsville Theater, thus realizing a dream of her late husband. Grossman recounted that she was compelled to carry out the renovation sooner than she had anticipated due to amendments to the municipal zoning bylaw that would have prevented her from starting a music venue. The theater opened in 1989; she eventually sold it and the other businesses in 2004. She was noted for being an "imposing businessperson" while eschewing media publicity. Towards her final years, she worked on a documentary about Albert Grossman.

== Personal life ==
Grossman married Albert Grossman in 1964. They met while he was organizing folk music acts that performed at the establishments where she was waitressing. They moved to Woodstock, New York, and remained married until his death in 1986.

Grossman died on the night of March 10–11, 2021, at her home in the Bearsville area of Woodstock. She was 81; as of March 15, 2024 the cause of death had not yet been determined.
