= Jesse Dylan =

American film director (born 1966)

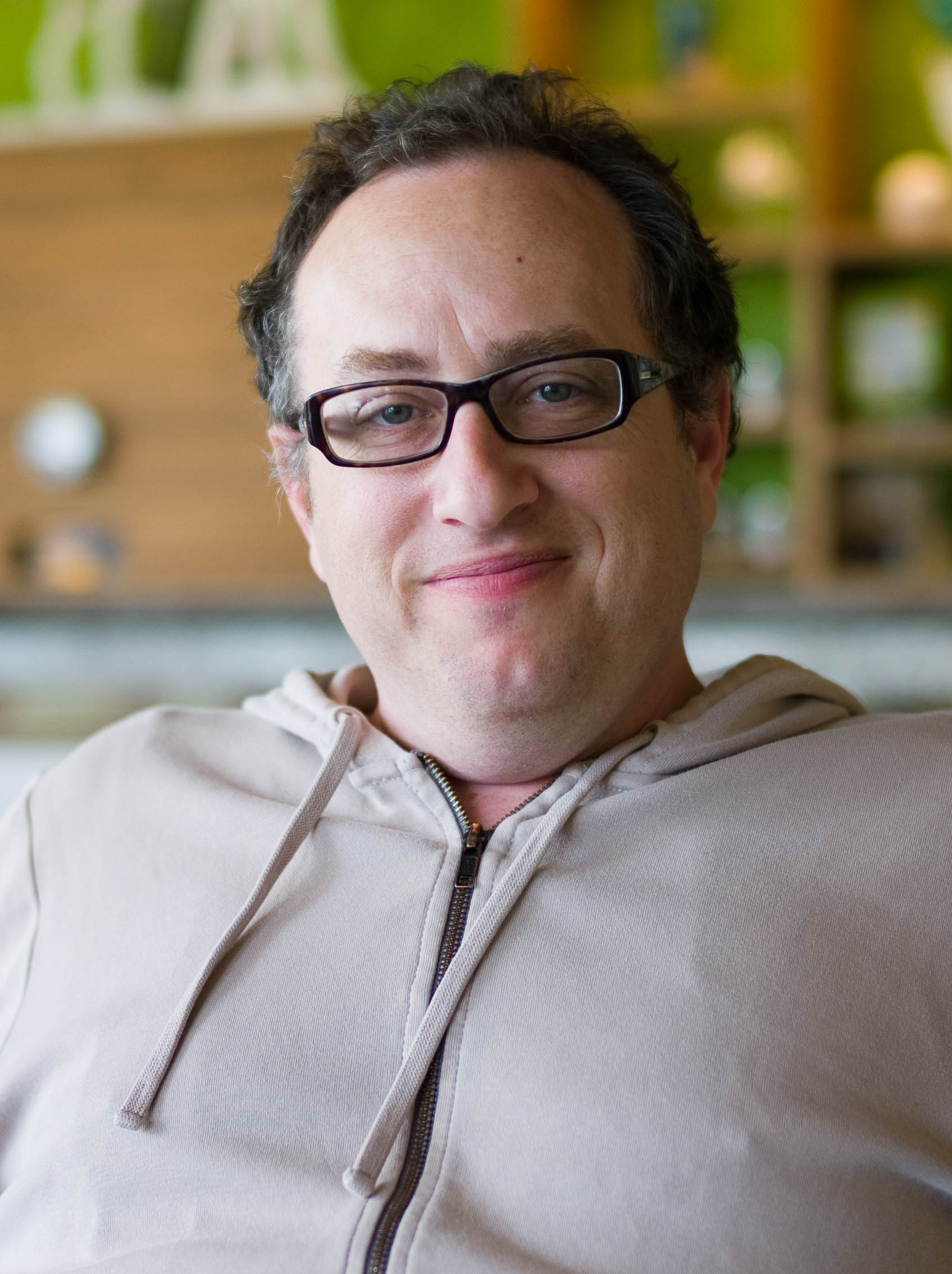
- Dylan in 2010
- Born: Jesse Byron Dylan; January 6, 1966 (age 60); New York City, U.S.
- Education: New York University
- Years active: 1973–present
- Parent(s): Bob Dylan; Sara Lownds
- Relatives: Jakob Dylan (brother)
- Website: wondros.com

Jesse Byron Dylan (born January 6, 1966) is an American film director and production executive. He is the founder of the media production company Wondros and Lybba, a non-profit organization. He is also a member of the Council on Foreign Relations and TED. He is the son of musician Bob Dylan and former model Sara Lownds and brother of singer-songwriter Jakob Dylan.

== Early life and education ==
Dylan was born in New York City, and is the eldest son of musician Bob Dylan and Sara Lownds Dylan. His father adopted Sara's daughter from a prior marriage, Maria Lownds (b. October 21, 1961). Bob and Sara Dylan divorced when Jesse was 11 years old.

Dylan attended New York University film school.

== Career ==
Dylan began his career directing music videos for clients including Tom Waits, Elvis Costello, Tom Petty, Lita Ford, Public Image Limited and Lenny Kravitz. Dylan is also known for providing the cover photo of Waits' 1992 album Bone Machine.

=== "Yes We Can" ===
In 2008, he directed the will.i.am Emmy Award-winning music video "Yes We Can", inspired by Barack Obama's campaign for President. The film was created in three days, and featured over 30 celebrity supporters singing then-candidate Barack Obama's New Hampshire Primary concession speech. Originally posted on YouTube, "Yes We Can" received over 26 million views just days after its release, and was recognized by AdAge in 2012 as one of the most influential political ads of all time.

=== Other work ===
His feature film directorial work consists of comedies such as Kicking & Screaming, starring Will Ferrell and Robert Duvall, American Wedding and How High. Other feature-length projects include the documentary Crips and Bloods: Made in America, which explores the culture of gangs and systemic violence in South Los Angeles. He produced the film for director Stacy Peralta who premiered it at the 2008 Sundance Film Festival. Dylan also produced and directed an original television series, "CONversations with Ricky Jay," which was built around sleight of hand artist Ricky Jay.

In 2020, Dylan served as director and executive producer of Soros, examining the personal history and public activism of George Soros, the billionaire investor and philanthropist.

=== Founding of Wondros, formerly known as Lybba ===
In 2007, Dylan launched Lybba, a non-profit organization focused on the open source healthcare movement. The project, according to Fast Company, "combines the latest verified medical data with social networking to allow patients and health-care professionals to make informed decisions." The self-professed goal of the project is "to create an online central repository of medical information." Since their foundation, Lybba has worked with such partners as the Collaborative Chronic Care Network (C3N) and Early Development Systems Initiative (EDSI).

The name of the organization has since changed to Wondros.
