= On the Road Again (Bob Dylan song) =

Single by Bob Dylan

from the album Bringing It All Back Home
- A-side: "Maggie's Farm"
- Released: March 22, 1965
- Recorded: January 15, 1965
- Studio: Columbia Recording, New York City
- Genre: Folk rock; blues rock
- Length: 2:35
- Label: Columbia
- Songwriter: Bob Dylan
- Producer: Tom Wilson

"On the Road Again" is a song written and recorded by Bob Dylan for his album Bringing It All Back Home. The song appears on the album's electric A-side, between "Outlaw Blues" and "Bob Dylan's 115th Dream". Like the rest of Bringing It All Back Home, "On the Road Again" was recorded in January, 1965 and produced by Tom Wilson.

Musically, "On the Road Again" is a simple rhythm & blues rock number with a twelve-bar structure. The music is untidy, with a thrusting beat, harmonica breaks, and an opposing riff.

== Meaning ==
The song's lyrics continue to address the myth of sensitive artist versus venal society that informs several other songs from A-side of the album, such as "Maggie's Farm", "Outlaw Blues", and "Bob Dylan's 115th Dream". The song also reflects other songs on the album, such as "Maggie's Farm" in that resistance to society is enacted through self-exile, removal and denial. This is particularly reflected in the lyrics:

You ask why I don't live here
Honey, how come you don't move?

The song also previews the comic grotesques that will become more prominent on songs in later albums. The song reflects a paranoid version of dread of dealing with in-laws. The narrator wakes up in the morning and has to face a surreal world where his mother-in-law hides in the refrigerator, his father-in-law wears a mask of Napoleon and the grandfather-in-law's cane turns into a sword, the grandmother-in-law prays to pictures and an uncle-in-law steals from the narrator's pockets, in lyrics such as:

Your mama, she's a-hidin'
Inside the icebox
Your daddy walks in wearin' Napoleon Bonaparte mask

Frogs live in the narrator's socks, his food is covered in dirt, and deliverymen and servants have a sinister presence.

== Title inspiration ==
The song's title echoes the title of Jack Kerouac's novel On the Road, which was a defining work of the Beat Generation. Dylan has acknowledged being influenced by Kerouac. However, it seems more likely that the title, and the song in itself, is a response to the song "On the Road", a traditional blues performed by the Memphis Jug Band with more serious lyrical content concerning an unfaithful woman.
