= Daniel Kramer (photographer) =

American photographer (1932–2024)

- Born: May 19, 1932; Brooklyn, New York, U.S.
- Died: April 29, 2024 (aged 91); Melville, New York, U.S.
- Occupation: Photographer

Daniel Kramer was an American photographer best known for his photos of Bob Dylan.

== Career ==
Kramer photographed Dylan frequently in 1964–65, the year Dylan went electric, shooting and art-directing the covers of Dylan's albums Bringing It All Back Home and Highway 61 Revisited, the second of which received a GRAMMY nomination for best album cover. Rolling Stone magazine called Kramer "the photographer most closely associated with Bob Dylan". Kramer is also known for photographs of Muhammad Ali, Janis Joplin, Johnny Cash, and Norman Mailer.

Kramer's photos taken while spending a year on the road with Dylan are published in his book Bob Dylan: A Year and a Day. His photos have been featured in the Rock and Roll Hall of Fame and Museum, the Whitney Museum of American Art, the Grammy Museum, and many other places. He was born in Brooklyn, New York, and died in 2024 at the age of 91.

== Nominations ==
- Best album cover – photography at 8th Annual Grammy Awards, for Bringing It All Back Home

== Works ==
- Bringing It All Back Home – album cover
- Highway 61 Revisited – album cover
- Biograph – album cover
- Bob Dylan: A Year and a Day (photo book)
