= Subterranean Homesick Blues =

1965 Bob Dylan song

- Norwegian picture sleeve

Single by Bob Dylan

from the album Bringing It All Back Home
- B-side: "She Belongs to Me"
- Released: March 8, 1965
- Recorded: January 14, 1965
- Studio: Columbia 7th Ave, New York City
- Genre: Folk rock; blues rock; talking blues; rock and roll; proto-rap
- Length: 2:20
- Label: Columbia
- Songwriter: Bob Dylan
- Producer: Tom Wilson

Bob Dylan singles chronology
"The Times They Are a-Changin'" (1965)	"Subterranean Homesick Blues" (1965)	"Maggie's Farm" (1965)

"Subterranean Homesick Blues" is a song by the American singer-songwriter Bob Dylan. Recorded on January 14, 1965, it was released as a single in the U.S. by Columbia Records on March 8, and release in the U.K. followed on April 23. It is the first track on the album Bringing It All Back Home, released some two weeks later. It was Dylan's first Top 40 hit in the United States, peaking at number 39 on the Billboard Hot 100. It also entered the Top 10 of the UK Singles Chart. The song has been reissued on various compilations, starting with 1967's Bob Dylan's Greatest Hits. One of Dylan's first electric recordings, "Subterranean Homesick Blues" is also notable for its innovative music video, which first appeared in D. A. Pennebaker's documentary Dont Look Back. An acoustic version of the song, recorded the day before the single, was released on The Bootleg Series Volumes 1–3 (Rare & Unreleased) 1961–1991.

"Subterranean Homesick Blues" is ranked 187th on Rolling Stone's 500 Greatest Songs of All Time list. In its contemporary review, Cash Box described it as a "rockin’-country folk blueser with a solid beat and catchy lyrics" and "wild" guitar and harmonica playing.

== References and allusions ==
Dylan has said that when he attended the University of Minnesota in 1959, he fell under the influence of the Beat scene: "It was Jack Kerouac, Ginsberg, Corso and Ferlinghetti." Kerouac's The Subterraneans, a novel published in 1958 about the Beats, has been suggested as a possible inspiration for the song's title.

In 2004, Dylan said of the song: "It's from Chuck Berry, a bit of 'Too Much Monkey Business' and some of the scat songs of the '40s."

The song's first line is a reference to codeine distillation and the politics of the time: "Johnny's in the basement mixing up the medicine / I'm on the pavement thinkin' about the government". The song also depicts some of the growing conflicts between "straights" or "squares" and the emerging counterculture of the 1960s. The widespread use of recreational drugs and turmoil surrounding the Vietnam War were starting to take hold of the nation, and Dylan's hyperkinetic lyrics were dense with up-to-the-minute allusions to emerging elements in the 1960s youth culture. According to rock journalist Andy Gill, "an entire generation recognized the zeitgeist in the verbal whirlwind of 'Subterranean Homesick Blues'."

The song also refers to the struggles surrounding the American civil rights movement ("Better stay away from those / That carry 'round a fire hose"—during the civil rights movement, peaceful protestors were beaten and sprayed with high-pressure fire hoses). The song was Dylan's first Top 40 hit in the United States.

== Influence ==
"Subterranean Homesick Blues" has had a wide influence, and is often quoted or alluded to. Its lyric "you don't need a weatherman to know which way the wind blows" was the inspiration for the name of the American far-left organization known as the Weather Underground, which formed after breaking away from the Students for a Democratic Society. In a 2007 study of legal opinions and briefs that found Dylan was quoted by judges and lawyers more than any other songwriter, "you don't need a weatherman..." was distinguished as the line most often cited. (Note: According to the study, Dylan was cited in court documents 186 times; the next closest was the Beatles, cited 74 times (Los Angeles Times, May 9, 2011).)

John Lennon was reported to find the song so captivating that he did not know how he would be able to write a song that could compete with it. The group Firehose took its name from a lyric from the song: "Better stay away from those that carry around a fire hose..." A line in the song provided the Australian garage rock band Jet with the title of their debut album Get Born. The song is alluded to by Radiohead's "Subterranean Homesick Alien" from the 1997 album OK Computer.

== Versions ==
Covers of the song span a range of styles, including those by the reggae musician Gregory Isaacs on Is It Rolling Bob?, his 2004 album of Dylan songs, with Toots Hibbert; the bluegrass musician Tim O'Brien on his 1996 album of Dylan covers, Red on Blonde; the rock band Red Hot Chili Peppers on the 1987 album The Uplift Mofo Party Plan; the Cajun-style fiddle player Doug Kershaw on Louisiana Man in 1978; and the singer-songwriter Harry Nilsson on his 1974 album Pussy Cats, produced by John Lennon, who admired the song. The song was also covered by Alanis Morissette when she stood in for Dylan at his 2005 induction into the UK Music Hall of Fame. In addition, Robert Wyatt's "Blues in Bob Minor", on his 1997 album Shleep, uses the song's rhythm as a structural template.

In December 2009, the rapper Juelz Santana released the single "Mixin' Up the Medicine", which features lyrics in the chorus, performed by alternative rapper Yelawolf, and maintains some of the song's original acoustics. Ed Volker of the New Orleans Radiators also has performed the song in his solo shows and with the Radiators, often paired with "Highway 61 Revisited".

In 1985, British actor Tom Watt, at the time enjoying a high profile playing the role of Lofty Holloway in EastEnders, released a version of the song that made number 174 in the UK singles chart.

== Promotional film clip ==
The three locations for the "cue card" clip as seen in Dont Look Back

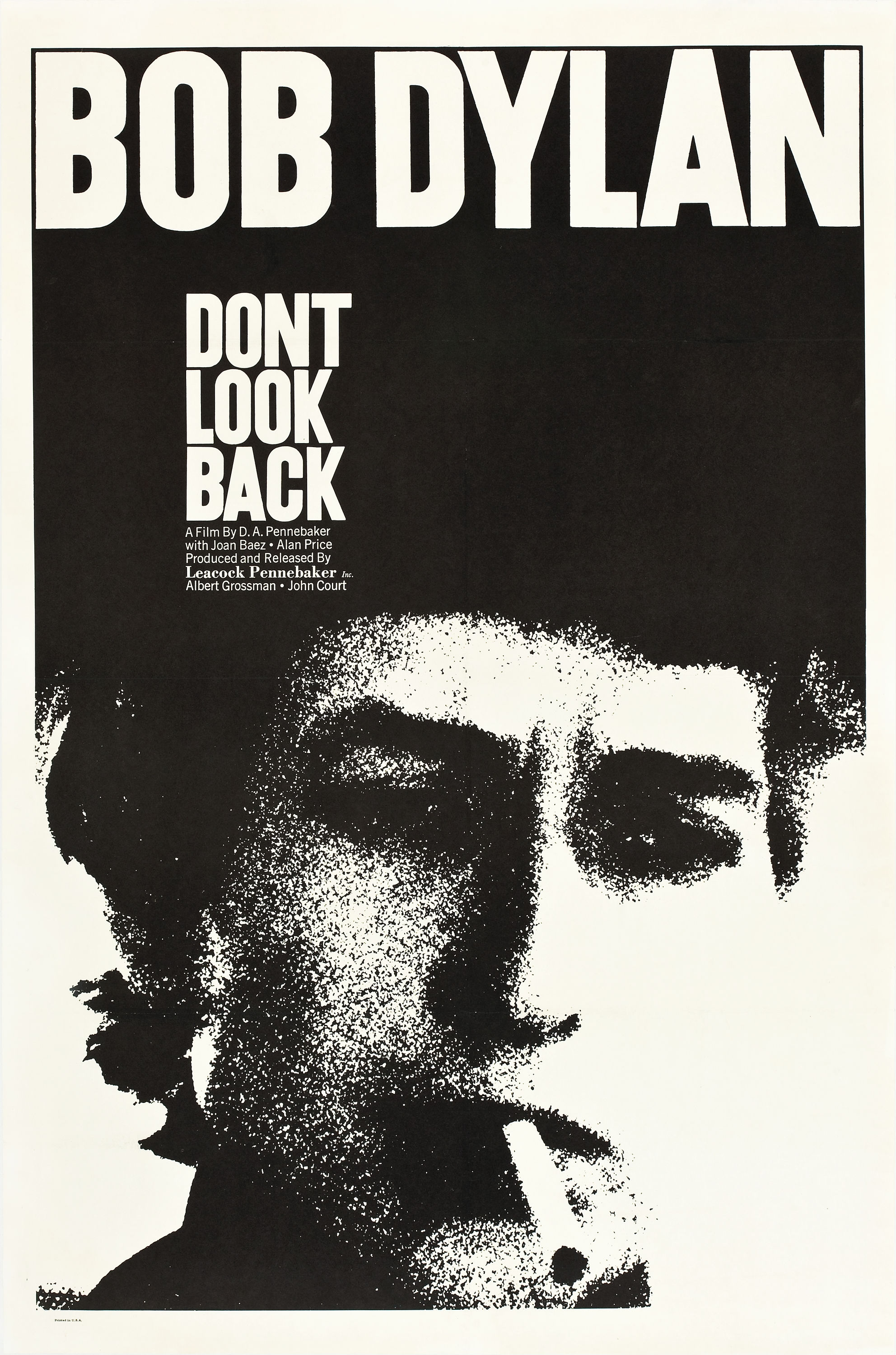
The clip was originally a segment of D. A. Pennebaker's film Dont Look Back

The song was used in one of the first "modern" promotional film clips, the forerunner of what was later known as the music video. Rolling Stone ranked it seventh in the magazine's October 1993 list of "100 Top Music Videos". The original clip was the opening segment of D. A. Pennebaker's film Dont Look Back, a documentary on Dylan's 1965 tour of England. In the film, Dylan, who came up with the idea, holds up cue cards with selected words and phrases from the lyrics. The cue cards were written by Donovan, Allen Ginsberg, Bob Neuwirth and Dylan himself.

While staring at the camera, Dylan flips the cards as the song plays. There are intentional misspellings and puns throughout the clip: for instance, when the song's lyrics say "eleven dollar bills", the poster says "20 dollar bills". The clip was shot in an alley close to the Savoy Hotel in London. Ginsberg is constantly visible in the background, talking to Neuwirth. For use as a trailer, the following text was superimposed at the end of the clip, Dylan and Ginsberg are exiting the frame: "SURFACING HERE SOON | BOB DYLAN IN | DONT LOOK BACK By D. A. PENNEBAKER". The Savoy Hotel has retained much of its exterior as it was in 1965, and the alley used in the film has been identified as the Savoy Steps.

In addition to the Savoy Hotel clip, two alternative promotional films were shot: one in a park (Embankment Gardens, adjacent to the Savoy Hotel) where Dylan, Neuwirth and Ginsberg are joined by Dylan's producer, Tom Wilson, and another shot on the roof of an unknown building. A montage of the clips can be seen in the documentary No Direction Home.

The film clip was used in September 2010 in a promotional video to launch Google Instant. As they are typed, the lyrics of the song generate search engine results pages.

The 1992 Tim Robbins film Bob Roberts features Robbins in the title role as a right-wing folk singer who uses Dylan's cue-card concept for the song "Wall Street Rap".

"Weird Al" Yankovic's music video for the 2003 song "Bob" parodies Dylan's music and writing style with a series of 38 palindromic sentences. The word "Bob" is itself a palindrome and Yankovic mimics Dylan's video by dressing as Dylan and dropping cue cards that have the song's lyrics on them.

Several other musicians have imitated or paid homage to the video by using a similar cue-card format, most notably Australian band INXS in the video for their 1987 song "Mediate" and the German band Wir sind Helden in their 2005 song "Nur ein Wort" (Just one word). In 2014, the Danish band Powersolo released a music video for their song "Boom Babba Do Ba Dabba". Since the lyrics consist only of the title of the song, all the cue cards were identical, apart from one saying "steak frites".

== Personnel ==
- Bob Dylan – vocals, acoustic guitars, harmonica
- John Hammond Jr. – electric guitar
- Bruce Langhorne – electric guitar
- Bill Lee – bass guitar
- Bobby Gregg – drums

== Certifications ==
Certifications for "Subterranean Homesick Blues"
Region	Certification	Certified units/sales
United Kingdom (BPI) sales since 2011	Silver	200,000^{‡}
United States (RIAA)	Gold	500,000^{‡}
^{‡} Sales+streaming figures based on certification alone.
