= Highway 61 Revisited (song) =

Single by Bob Dylan

from the album Highway 61 Revisited
- A-side: "Can You Please Crawl Out Your Window?"
- Released: August 30, 1965
- Recorded: August 2, 1965
- Studio: Columbia, New York City
- Genre: Folk rock · garage rock · blues
- Length: 3:30
- Label: Columbia
- Songwriter: Bob Dylan
- Producer: Bob Johnston

"Highway 61 Revisited" is the title track of Bob Dylan's 1965 album Highway 61 Revisited. It was also released as the B-side to the single "Can You Please Crawl Out Your Window?" later the same year. In 2004, Rolling Stone magazine ranked the song as number 364 in their 500 Greatest Songs of All Time.

== Background ==
Highway 61 runs from Duluth, Minnesota, where Bob Dylan was born, south to New Orleans, Louisiana, following the Mississippi River for most of its 1,400 miles (2,300 km). It was a major transit route out of the Deep South, particularly for African Americans traveling north to Chicago, St. Louis, and Memphis.

== Lyrics ==
The song has five stanzas. In each stanza, someone describes an unusual problem that is ultimately resolved on Highway 61. In Verse 1, God tells Abraham to "kill me a son". God wants the killing done on Highway 61. This stanza refers to Genesis 22, in which God commands Abraham to kill one of his two sons, Isaac. Abram, the original name of the biblical Abraham, is the name of Dylan's own father. Verse 2 describes a poor fellow, Georgia Sam, who is beyond the helping of the welfare department. He is told to go down Highway 61. Georgia Sam may be a reference to Piedmont blues musician Blind Willie McTell, who occasionally went by Georgia Sam when recording.

In the third verse, "Mack the Finger" has the problem of getting rid of particular absurd things: "I got forty red white and blue shoe strings / And a thousand telephones that don't ring". "Louie the King" solves the problem with Highway 61. Verse 4 is about the "fifth daughter" who on the "twelfth night" told the "first father" that her complexion is too pale. Agreeing, the father seeks to tell the "second mother," but she is with the "seventh son," on Highway 61. The inspiration for this verse may be drawn from the enumeration pattern at the beginning of the Old Testament book of Ezekiel.

The fifth and last verse is the story of a bored gambler, trying "to create the next world war." His promoter tells him to "put some bleachers out in the sun / And have it on Highway 61." There is an evident political undertone in this absurd tale.

== Siren whistle ==
At the opening of the song, and between each verse, Dylan is heard blowing a siren whistle. In the liner notes to Live 1966, Tony Glover writes that the whistle was brought in by Sam Lay, the drummer on the Highway 61 sessions. Other accounts say the whistle was brought in by Al Kooper, who used it to police the sessions. Supposedly, if someone were to begin doing drugs he would go into a corner and blow on the whistle. He later suggested to Dylan that he use the whistle in this song instead of his harmonica.

== Reception ==
Cash Box described it as a "rollicking, warm-hearted twangy affair."

== Cover versions ==
In 1969, Johnny Winter covered "Highway 61 Revisited" on his second Columbia release, Second Winter. Winter's rendition is regarded as "a career-defining track," and the song became a staple of his live performances. A 10-minute version of the song appears on his 1976 live album, Captured Live! He also performed it live in 1992 for The 30th Anniversary Concert Celebration album, which saluted Dylan's three decades as a recording artist.

Ex-Dr Feelgood guitarist Wilko Johnson included "Highway 61 Revisited" in his concert sets in the late 1970s and released a live recording of the song on an EP given away with his 1978 album Solid Senders. The recording now forms part of the album's CD release. In 1987, Dr Feelgood also covered the song for their album Classic, a track AllMusic describes as "utterly inspired."

A cover by PJ Harvey appears on her 1993 album Rid of Me. Paste magazine called it the 15th-best cover of a Dylan song of all time, while also paying homage to "Johnny Winter's classic electric-blues version."
