= Bringing It All Back Home =

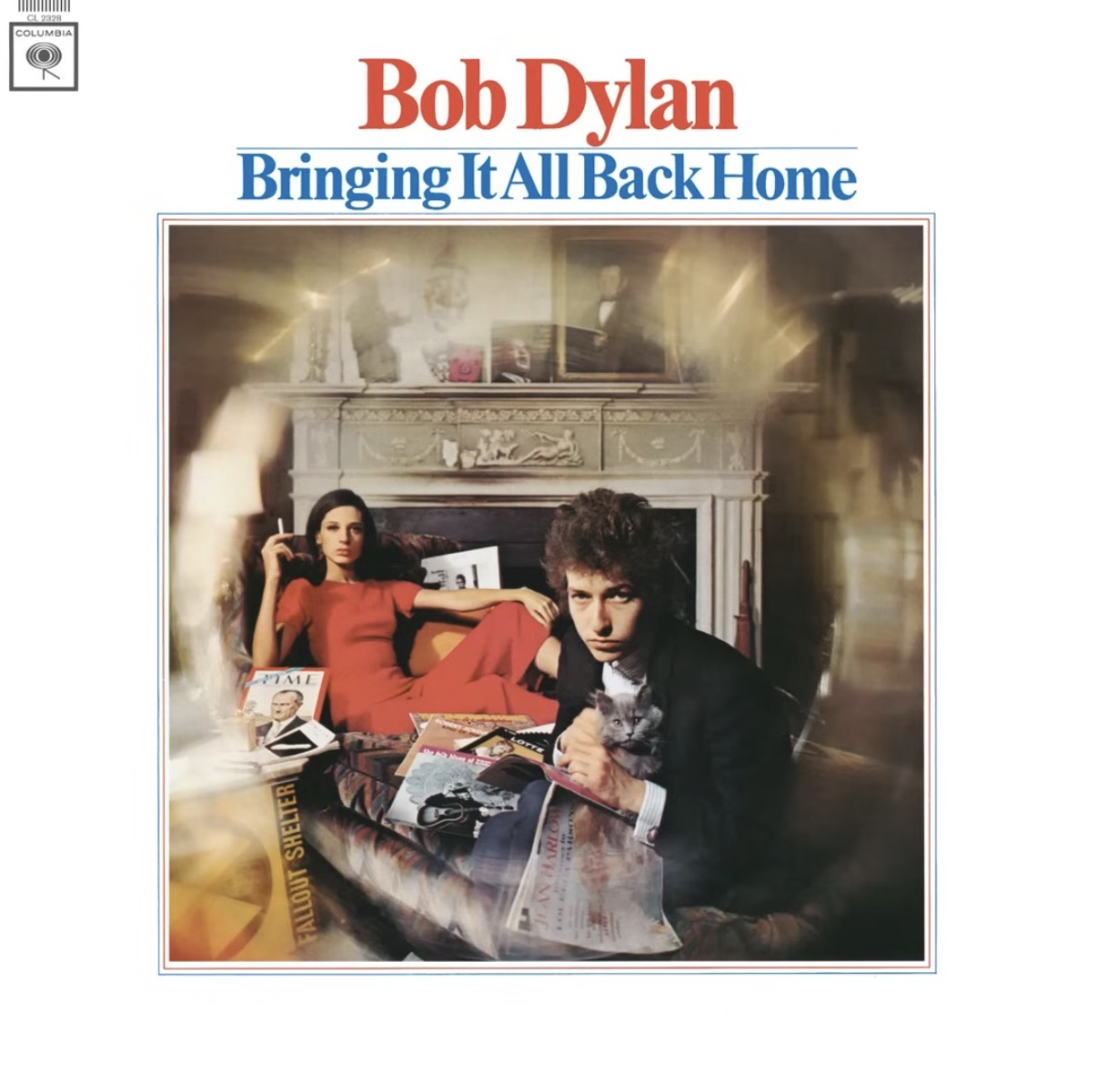

Studio album by Bob Dylan
- Released: April 1965
- Recorded: January 13–15, 1965
- Studios: Columbia 7th Ave, New York City
- Genres: Folk rock; folk; blues
- Length: 47:21
- Label: Columbia
- Producer: Tom Wilson

Bob Dylan chronology
Another Side of Bob Dylan (1964)	Bringing It All Back Home (1965)	Highway 61 Revisited (1965)

Singles from Bringing It All Back Home
- 1. "Subterranean Homesick Blues" / "She Belongs to Me" Released: March 8, 1965; 2. "Maggie's Farm" / "On the Road Again" Released: June 1965 (UK only)

Bringing It All Back Home is the fifth studio album by the American singer-songwriter Bob Dylan. Released by Columbia Records in April 1965, (Note: Later sources usually identify the release date as March 22, 1965. On March 3, Ralph J. Gleason reported that the album was "set for release at the end of this month", but Cash Box magazine reported that it was among Columbia's planned April releases. On April 17, Billboard magazine identified it as a new release and reviewed it the following week.) the album was Dylan's first to incorporate electric instrumentation. It was so different from his earlier work that it caused controversy and divided the contemporary folk scene.

On the first half of the album—the songs on side one of the original LP—Dylan is backed by an electric rock and roll band. The second half features mainly acoustic songs. The album abandons the protest music of Dylan's previous records for more surreal, complex lyrics.

The album reached No. 6 on Billboard's Pop Albums chart, the first of Dylan's LPs to break into the US Top 10. It topped the UK charts later that spring. The first track, "Subterranean Homesick Blues", became Dylan's first single to chart in the US, peaking at No. 39. Bringing It All Back Home has been described as one of the greatest albums of all time by multiple publications. In 2003, it was ranked number 31 on Rolling Stone's list of the "500 Greatest Albums of All Time"; it was ranked number 181 in the 2020 edition.

== Recording ==
Dylan spent much of the summer of 1964 in Woodstock, a small town in upstate New York where his manager, Albert Grossman, had a place. When Joan Baez went to see Dylan that August, they stayed at Grossman's house. Baez recalls that "most of the month or so we were there, Bob stood at the typewriter in the corner of his room, drinking red wine and smoking and tapping away relentlessly for hours. And in the dead of night, he would wake up, grunt, grab a cigarette, and stumble over to the typewriter again." Dylan already had one song ready for his next album: "Mr. Tambourine Man" was written in February 1964 but omitted from Another Side of Bob Dylan. Another song, "Gates of Eden", was written earlier that year, appearing in the original manuscripts to Another Side of Bob Dylan; it's unclear whether subsequent lyrical changes were made that August in Woodstock. At least two songs were written that month: "If You Gotta Go, Go Now" and "It's Alright, Ma (I'm Only Bleeding)". Dylan's lyrics became increasingly surreal, and his prose grew more stylistic, often resembling stream-of-consciousness writing. Letters he wrote in 1964 became increasingly intense and dreamlike as the year wore on.

Dylan returned to the city, and on August 28, he met the Beatles for the first time in their New York hotel. The meeting influenced Dylan, whose next three albums would invoke a rock sound. Dylan would remain on good terms with the Beatles, and as biographer Clinton Heylin writes, "The evening established a personal dimension to the very real rivalry that would endure for the remainder of a momentous decade."

Dylan and producer Tom Wilson were soon experimenting with their own fusion of rock and folk music. The first unsuccessful test involved overdubbing a "Fats Domino early rock & roll thing" over Dylan's earlier, acoustic recording of "House of the Rising Sun", according to Wilson. This took place in the Columbia 30th Street Studio in December 1964. It was quickly discarded, though Wilson would more famously use the same technique of overdubbing an electric backing track to an existing acoustic recording with Simon & Garfunkel's "The Sound of Silence". In the meantime, Dylan turned his attention to another folk-rock experiment conducted by John P. Hammond, an old friend and musician whose father, John H. Hammond, originally signed Dylan to Columbia. Hammond was planning an electric album around the blues songs that framed his acoustic live performances of the time. To do this, he recruited three members of the Hawks, an American/Canadian bar band he met the previous year: guitarist Robbie Robertson, drummer Levon Helm, and organist Garth Hudson. (The Hawks would go on to become the Band.) Dylan was very aware of the resulting album, So Many Roads; according to his friend, Danny Kalb, "Bob was really excited about what John Hammond was doing with electric blues. I talked to him in the Figaro in 1964 and he was telling me about John and his going to Chicago and playing with a band and so on…"

However, when Dylan and Wilson began work on the next album, they temporarily refrained from electric experimentation. The first session, held on January 13, 1965, in Columbia's Studio A in New York, was recorded solo, with Dylan playing piano or acoustic guitar. Ten complete songs and several song sketches were produced, nearly all of which were discarded. Take one of "Bob Dylan's 115th Dream" would be used for the album, but three would eventually be released: "I'll Keep It With Mine" on 1985's Biograph, and "Farewell Angelina" and an acoustic version of "Subterranean Homesick Blues" on 1991's The Bootleg Series Volumes 1–3 (Rare & Unreleased) 1961–1991.

Other songs and sketches recorded at this session: "Love Minus Zero/No Limit", "It's All Over Now, Baby Blue", "She Belongs to Me", "On the Road Again", "If You Gotta Go, Go Now", "You Don't Have to Do That", "California," and "Outlaw Blues", all of which were original compositions.

Dylan and Wilson held another session at Studio A the following day, this time with a full, electric band. Guitarists Al Gorgoni, Kenny Rankin, and Bruce Langhorne were recruited, as were pianist Paul Griffin, bassists Joseph Macho Jr. and William E. Lee, and drummer Bobby Gregg. The day's work focused on eight songs, all of which had been attempted the previous day. According to Langhorne, there was no rehearsal, "we just did first takes and I remember that, for what it was, it was amazingly intuitive and successful." Few takes were required of each song, and after three and a half hours of recording (lasting from 2:30 pm to 6:00 pm), master takes of "Love Minus Zero/No Limit", "Subterranean Homesick Blues", "Outlaw Blues", "She Belongs to Me", and "Bob Dylan's 115th Dream" were all recorded and selected for the final album.

Sometime after dinner, Dylan reportedly continued recording with a different set of musicians, including John P. Hammond and John Sebastian (only Langhorne returned from earlier that day). They recorded six songs, but the results were deemed unsatisfactory and ultimately rejected.

Another session was held at Studio A the next day, and it would be the last one needed. Once again, Dylan kept at his disposal the musicians from the previous day (that is, those that participated in the 2:30 to 6:00 pm session); the one exception was pianist Paul Griffin, who was unable to attend and replaced by Frank Owens. Daniel Kramer recalls:

The musicians were enthusiastic. They conferred with one another to work out the problems as they arose. Dylan bounced around from one man to another, explaining what he wanted, often showing them on the piano what was needed until, like a giant puzzle, the pieces would fit and the picture emerged whole … Most of the songs went down easily and needed only three or four takes … In some cases, the first take sounded completely different from the final one because the material was played at a different tempo, perhaps, or a different chord was chosen, or solos may have been rearranged...His method of working, the certainty of what he wanted, kept things moving.

The session began with "Maggie's Farm": only one take was recorded, and it was the only one they'd ever need. From there, Dylan successfully recorded master takes of "On the Road Again", "It's Alright, Ma (I'm Only Bleeding)", "Gates of Eden", "Mr. Tambourine Man", and "It's All Over Now, Baby Blue", all of which were set aside for the album. A master take of "If You Gotta Go, Go Now" was also selected, but it would not be included on the album; instead, it was issued as a single-only release in Europe, but not in the US or the UK.

Though Dylan was able to record electric versions of virtually every song included on the final album, he apparently never intended Bringing It All Back Home to be completely electric. As a result, roughly half of the finished album would feature full electric band arrangements while the other half consisted of solo acoustic performances, sometimes accompanied by Langhorne, who would embellish Dylan's acoustic performance with a countermelody on his electric guitar.

== Songs ==
=== Overview ===
Bringing It All Back Home consists mainly of blues and folk and, as a result of Dylan's adoption of a more electric sound, is considered to have been instrumental in the birth of folk rock. On his following albums, Highway 61 Revisited and Blonde on Blonde, he would further develop the genre, influencing American folk acts such as Buffalo Springfield and Simon and Garfunkel as well as British Invasion bands like the Beatles and the Rolling Stones to innovate, producing more introspective lyrics and allowing the latter two groups to expand out of the confines of their pop rock roots. According to Pete Townshend of the Who, Dylan's folk style also influenced the writing of one of their most successful songs, the 1965 single "My Generation". In the Beatles' case, the results of this innovation — the albums Help! and Rubber Soul — would help push folk rock into the mainstream.

=== Side one ===
==== "Subterranean Homesick Blues" ====
The album opens with "Subterranean Homesick Blues", heavily inspired by Chuck Berry's "Too Much Monkey Business". "Subterranean Homesick Blues" became a Top 40 hit for Dylan. "Snagged by a sour, pinched guitar riff, the song has an acerbic tinge … and Dylan sings the title rejoinders in mock self-pity," writes music critic Tim Riley. "It's less an indictment of the system than a coil of imagery that spells out how the system hangs itself with the rope it's so proud of."

==== "She Belongs to Me" ====
"She Belongs to Me" extols the bohemian virtues of an artistic lover whose creativity must be constantly fed ("Bow down to her on Sunday / Salute her when her birthday comes. / For Halloween buy her a trumpet / And for Christmas, give her a drum.")

==== "Maggie's Farm" ====
"Maggie's Farm" contains themes of social, economic and political criticism, with lines such as "Well I try my best to be just like I am/But everybody wants you to be just like them" and "Well, I wake up in the morning, fold my hands and pray for rain/I got a head full of ideas that are drivin' me insane". It follows a straightforward blues structure, with the opening line of each verse ("I ain't gonna work...") sung twice, then repeated at the end of the verse. The third to fifth lines of each verse elaborate on and explain the sentiment expressed in the verse's opening/closing lines. It references working for Maggie, her father, her mother, and her brother on a farm.

==== "Love Minus Zero/No Limit" ====
"Love Minus Zero/No Limit" is a love song. Its main musical hook is a series of three descending chords, while its lyrics articulate Dylan's feelings for his lover, and have been interpreted as describing how she brings a needed zen-like calm to his chaotic world. The song uses surreal imagery, which some authors and critics have suggested recalls Edgar Allan Poe's "The Raven" and the biblical Book of Daniel. Critics have also remarked that the style of the lyrics is reminiscent of William Blake's poem "The Sick Rose".

==== "Outlaw Blues" ====
"Outlaw Blues" is an electric blues song that lyrically follows a fugitive traveling through harsh conditions ("Ain't it hard to stumble and land in some muddy lagoon?/Especially when it's nine below zero and three o'clock in the afternoon") as he resents the life of being on the run.

==== "On the Road Again" ====
"On the Road Again" catalogs the absurd affectations and degenerate living conditions of bohemia. The song concludes: "Then you ask why I don't live here / Honey, how come you don't move?"

==== "Bob Dylan's 115th Dream" ====
"Bob Dylan's 115th Dream" narrates a surreal experience involving the discovery of America, "Captain Arab" (a clear reference to Captain Ahab of Moby Dick), and numerous bizarre encounters. It is the longest song in the electric section of the album, starting out as an acoustic ballad before being interrupted by laughter, and then starting back up again with an electric blues rhythm. The music is so similar in places to Another Side of Bob Dylan's "Motorpsycho Nitemare" as to be indistinguishable from it but for the electric instrumentation. The song can be best read as a highly sardonic, non-linear (historically) dreamscape parallel cataloguing of the discovery, creation and merits (or lack thereof) of the United States.

=== Side two ===
==== "Mr. Tambourine Man" ====
"Mr. Tambourine Man" was written and composed in early 1964, at the same approximate time as "Chimes of Freedom", which Dylan recorded later that spring for his album Another Side of Bob Dylan. The lyrics are surrealist and may be influenced by the work of Arthur Rimbaud (most notably for the "magic swirlin' ship" evoked in the lyrics).

==== "Gates of Eden" ====
"Gates of Eden" is the only song on the album that is mono on the stereo release and all subsequent reissues. Dylan plays the song solo, accompanying himself on acoustic guitar and harmonica. It is considered one of Dylan's most surreal songs.

==== "It's Alright Ma (I'm Only Bleeding)" ====
"It's Alright Ma (I'm Only Bleeding)" was written in the summer of 1964, first performed live on October 10, 1964, and recorded on January 15, 1965. It is described by Dylan biographer Howard Sounes as a "grim masterpiece". The song features some of Dylan's most memorable lyrical images. Among the well-known lines sung in the song are "He not busy being born is busy dying," "Money doesn't talk, it swears," "Although the masters make the rules, for the wisemen and the fools" and "But even the president of the United States sometimes must have to stand naked." Musically, it is similar to Dylan's cover of "Highway 51 Blues", which he recorded four years earlier and released on his debut album, Bob Dylan.

==== "It's All Over Now, Baby Blue" ====
"It's All Over Now, Baby Blue" is the album's closing song. The song was recorded on January 15, 1965, with Dylan's acoustic guitar and harmonica and William E. Lee's bass guitar the only instrumentation.

== Artwork ==
The album's cover, photographed by Daniel Kramer with an edge-softened lens, features Sally Grossman (wife of Dylan's manager Albert Grossman) lounging in the background. There are also artifacts scattered around the room, including LPs by the Impressions (Keep On Pushing), Robert Johnson (King of the Delta Blues Singers), Ravi Shankar (India's Master Musician), Lotte Lenya (Sings Berlin Theatre Songs by Kurt Weill) and Eric Von Schmidt (The Folk Blues of Eric Von Schmidt). Dylan had "met" Schmidt "one day in the green pastures of Harvard University" and would later mimic his album cover pose (tipping his hat) for his own Nashville Skyline four years later. A further record, Françoise Hardy's EP J'suis D'accord, was on the floor near Dylan's feet but can only be seen in other shots from the same photo session, as well as a copy of the Wilhelm/Baynes version of I Ching.

Visible behind Grossman is the top of Dylan's head from the cover of Another Side of Bob Dylan; under her right arm is the magazine Time with President Lyndon B. Johnson as "Man of the Year" on the cover of the January 1, 1965 issue. There is a harmonica resting on a table with a fallout shelter (capacity 80) sign leaning against it. Above the fireplace on the mantle directly to the left of the painting is the Lord Buckley album The Best of Lord Buckley. Next to Lord Buckley is a copy of GNAOUA, a magazine devoted to exorcism and Beat poetry edited by poet Ira Cohen, and a glass collage by Dylan called "The Clown" made for Bernard Paturel from colored glass Bernard was about to discard.

Dylan sits forward holding his cat (named Rolling Stone) and has an opened magazine featuring an advertisement on Jean Harlow's Life Story by the columnist Louella Parsons resting on his crossed leg. The cufflinks Dylan wore in the picture were a gift from Joan Baez, as she later referenced in her 1975 song "Diamonds & Rust". Daniel Kramer received a Grammy nomination for best album cover for the photograph.

On the back cover (also by Kramer), the woman massaging Dylan's scalp is the filmmaker and performance artist Barbara Rubin.

== Release ==
Bringing It All Back Home was released in April 1965 by Columbia Records. The mono version of Bringing It All Back Home was re-released in 2010 on The Original Mono Recordings, accompanied by a booklet containing a critical essay by Greil Marcus. A high-definition 5.1 surround sound edition of the album was released on SACD by Columbia in 2003.

== Reception ==
The release of Bringing It All Back Home coincided with the final show of a joint tour with Joan Baez. By this time, Dylan had grown far more popular and acclaimed than Baez, and his music had radically evolved from their former shared folk style in a totally unique direction. It would be the last time they would perform extensively together until 1975. (She would accompany him on another tour in May 1965, but Dylan would not ask her to perform with him.) The timing was appropriate as Bringing It All Back Home signaled a new era. Dylan was backed by an electric rock and roll band—a move that further alienated him from some of his former peers in the folk music community. The album reached No. 6 on Billboard's Pop Albums chart, the first of Dylan's LPs to break into the US top 10. It also topped the UK charts later that spring. The first track, "Subterranean Homesick Blues", became Dylan's first single to chart in the US, peaking at No. 39.

=== Legacy ===
Professional ratings
Review scores
Source	Rating
AllMusic	5/5 stars
Chicago Tribune	4/4 stars
Encyclopedia of Popular Music	5/5 stars
Entertainment Weekly	A
MusicHound Rock	4.5/5
The Rolling Stone Album Guide	5/5 stars
Tom Hull	A

Bringing It All Back Home is regarded as one of the greatest albums in rock history. In 1979 Rolling Stone Record Guide critic Dave Marsh wrote: "By fusing the Chuck Berry beat of the Rolling Stones and the Beatles with the leftist, folk tradition of the folk revival, Dylan really had brought it back home, creating a new kind of rock & roll [...] that made every type of artistic tradition available to rock." Clinton Heylin later wrote that Bringing It All Back Home was possibly "the most influential album of its era. Almost everything to come in contemporary popular song can be found therein." In 2003, the album was ranked number 31 on Rolling Stone magazine's list of the "500 Greatest Albums of All Time", maintaining the rating in a 2012 revised list. It moved down to number 181 on the 2020 list. The album was inducted into the Grammy Hall of Fame in 2006. In a 1986 interview, film director John Hughes cited it as so influential on him as an artist that upon its release (while Hughes was still in his teens), "Thursday I was one person, and Friday I was another." The album was included in Robert Christgau's "Basic Record Library" of 1950s and 1960s recordings—published in Christgau's Record Guide: Rock Albums of the Seventies (1981)—and in Robert Dimery's music reference book 1001 Albums You Must Hear Before You Die (2010). It was voted number 189 in the third edition of Colin Larkin's book All Time Top 1000 Albums (2000). Hip-hop group Public Enemy reference it in their 2007 Dylan tribute song "Long and Whining Road": "It's been a long and whining road, even though time keeps a-changin' / I'm a bring it all back home".

== Outtakes ==
The following outtakes were recorded for possible inclusion to Bringing It All Back Home.

- "California" (early version of "Outlaw Blues")
- "Farewell Angelina"
- "If You Gotta Go, Go Now (Or Else You Got to Stay All Night)"
- "I'll Keep It with Mine"
- "You Don't Have to Do That" (titled "Bending Down on My Stomick Lookin' West" on recording sheet)(fragment)

The raunchy "If You Gotta Go, Go Now (Or Else You Got To Stay All Night)" was issued as a single in Benelux. A different version of the song appears on The Bootleg Series Volumes 1–3 (Rare & Unreleased) 1961–1991. An upbeat, electric performance, the song is relatively straightforward, with the title providing much of the subtext. Manfred Mann took the song to No. 2 in the UK in September 1965. Fairport Convention recorded a tongue-in-cheek, acoustic French-language version, "Si Tu Dois Partir", for their celebrated third album, Unhalfbricking.

"I'll Keep It with Mine" was written before Another Side of Bob Dylan and was given to Nico in 1964. Nico was not yet a recording artist at the time, and she would eventually record the song for Chelsea Girl (released in 1967), but not before Judy Collins recorded her own version in 1965. Fairport Convention would also record their own version on their critically acclaimed second album, What We Did on Our Holidays. Widely considered a strong composition from this period (Clinton Heylin called it "one of his finest songs"), a complete acoustic version, with Dylan playing piano and harmonica, was released on 1985's Biograph. An electric recording—not of an actual take but of a rehearsal from January 1966 (the sound of an engineer saying "what you were doing" through a control room mike briefly interrupts the recording)—was released on The Bootleg Series Volumes 1–3 (Rare & Unreleased) 1961–1991.

"Farewell Angelina" was ultimately given to Joan Baez, who released it in 1965 as the title track of her album Farewell, Angelina. The Greek singer Nana Mouskouri recorded her own versions of this song in French ("Adieu Angelina") in 1967 and German ("Schlaf-ein Angelina") in 1975.

In the film Dont Look Back, a documentary of Dylan's 1965 tour of the UK, Baez is shown in one scene singing a fragment of the then apparently still unfinished song "Love Is Just A Four Letter Word" in a hotel room late at night. She then tells Dylan, "If you finish it, I'll sing it on a record". Dylan never released a version of the song, and, according to his website, he has never performed the song live.

"You Don't Have to Do That" is one of the great "what if" songs of Dylan's mid-1960s output. The recording, under a minute long, has Dylan playing a snippet of the song, which he abandoned midway through to begin playing the piano.

== Track listing ==
All tracks are written by Bob Dylan.

Side one
No.	Title	Recorded	Length
1.	"Subterranean Homesick Blues"	January 14, 1965	2:21
2.	"She Belongs to Me"	January 14, 1965	2:47
3.	"Maggie's Farm"	January 15, 1965	3:54
4.	"Love Minus Zero/No Limit"	January 14, 1965	2:51
5.	"Outlaw Blues"	January 14, 1965	3:05
6.	"On the Road Again"	January 15, 1965	2:35
7.	"Bob Dylan's 115th Dream"	January 13 (intro) and January 14, 1965	6:30
Total length:			24:03

Side two
No.	Title	Recorded	Length
1.	"Mr. Tambourine Man"	January 15, 1965	5:30
2.	"Gates of Eden"	January 15, 1965	5:40
3.	"It's Alright, Ma (I'm Only Bleeding)"	January 15, 1965	7:29
4.	"It's All Over Now, Baby Blue"	January 15, 1965	4:12
Total length:			22:51

== Personnel ==
- Bob Dylan – guitar, harmonica, keyboards, vocals

=== Additional musicians ===
- Steve Boone – bass guitar
- Al Gorgoni – guitar
- Bobby Gregg – drums
- Paul Griffin – piano, keyboards
- John P. Hammond – guitar
- Bruce Langhorne – guitar
- Bill Lee – bass guitar on Side 1 and “It's All Over Now, Baby Blue"
- Joseph Macho Jr. – bass guitar
- Frank Owens – piano
- Kenny Rankin – guitar
- John Sebastian – bass guitar

=== Technical ===
- Daniel Kramer – photography
- Tom Wilson – production

== Charts ==
=== Weekly charts ===
Chart (1965)	Peak position
UK Albums Chart	1
US Billboard 200	6

=== Singles ===
Year	Title	Peak chart positions		
Year	Title	US Main	US AC	UK
1965	"Subterranean Homesick Blues"	39	6	9
1965	"Maggie's Farm"	—	—	22

== Certifications ==
Region	Certification	Certified units/sales
United Kingdom (BPI)	Gold	100,000^{^}
United States (RIAA)	Platinum	1,000,000^{^}
^{^} Shipments figures based on certification alone.
