= Albert Grossman =

American music manager (1926–1986)

- Grossman in 1965
- Born: May 21, 1926; Chicago, Illinois, U.S.
- Died: January 25, 1986 (aged 59); Over North Atlantic Ocean
- Education: Roosevelt University
- Occupations: Entrepreneur; music manager
- Years active: 1950s–1986
- Known for: Manager of Bob Dylan
- Spouse: Sally Grossman (m. 1964)

Albert Grossman (May 21, 1926 – January 25, 1986) was an American entrepreneur and manager in the American folk music and rock and roll scene. He was famous as the manager of many of the most popular and successful performers of folk and folk-rock music, including Bob Dylan; Janis Joplin; Peter, Paul and Mary; the Band; Odetta; Gordon Lightfoot; and Ian & Sylvia.

== Early life ==
Grossman was born in Chicago on May 21, 1926, the son of Russian-Jewish immigrants who worked as tailors. He attended Chicago's Lane Technical High School before graduating from the city's Roosevelt University with a degree in economics.

== Career ==
After finishing college Grossman worked for the Chicago Housing Authority, leaving in the late 1950s to go into the club business. Seeing folk star Bob Gibson perform at the Off Beat Room in 1956 prompted Grossman's idea of a "listening room" to showcase Gibson and other talent, as the American folk-music revival movement grew. The result was the Gate of Horn in the basement of the Rice Hotel, where Jim (later Roger) McGuinn began his career as a 12-string guitarist.

Grossman moved into managing some of the acts who appeared at his club and in 1959 he joined forces with George Wein, who had founded the Newport Jazz Festival, to start up the Newport Folk Festival. At the first Newport Folk Festival, Grossman told The New York Times critic Robert Shelton: "The American public is like Sleeping Beauty, waiting to be kissed awake by the prince of folk music."

Dave Van Ronk, the seminal figure of the Greenwich Village folk scene in the early 1960s, said of Grossman:

He was a very very smart man, he was a brilliant man. And he was maybe the only person who understood how much money there was to be made out of the whole damn thing.

In 1961, Grossman put together Mary Travers, Noel Stookey, and Peter Yarrow as the folk group Peter, Paul and Mary. They achieved success the following year when their eponymous first album entered the Billboard Top Ten. The group had been avidly pursued by Atlantic Records, who were on the verge of signing them when the deal inexplicably fell through. The group signed with Warner Bros. Records instead and Atlantic's executives later discovered that it was because music publisher Artie Mogull had introduced Grossman to Warner executive Herman Starr, from whom Grossman was able to extract an unprecedented deal that gave the trio complete creative control over the recording and packaging of their music.

On August 20, 1962, Bob Dylan signed a contract that made Grossman his manager. Grossman also extended hospitality to Dylan at his home in Woodstock in upstate New York. Dylan liked the area so much he purchased a house there in 1965. The cover of Dylan's album Bringing It All Back Home, which includes Dylan and Grossman's wife Sally wearing a red trouser suit, was photographed at the Grossman Woodstock home. Having returned to Woodstock at the end of his 1966 World Tour, Dylan was on his way home from Grossman's house in Bearsville when he suffered the motorcycle accident that precipitated his eight-year withdrawal from touring.

When managing both Bob Dylan and Peter, Paul and Mary, Grossman brought the trio Dylan's song "Blowin' in the Wind" which they promptly recorded (on a single take) and successfully released.

In 1967, Grossman signed Janis Joplin and her four bandmates from Big Brother and the Holding Company with the condition that they not take intravenous drugs. When he discovered in the spring of 1969 that Joplin was injecting drugs anyway, he did not confront her. Instead, in June 1969 he took out a life insurance policy that would pay him $200,000 if she died in an accident. His yearly premium was $3,500. The insurer was The San Francisco Associated Indemnity Corporation.

In August 1969, when Bob Dylan was about to perform at the Isle of Wight Festival, English critic Michael Gray asked Grossman about the rumor that the Beatles might appear on-stage with Dylan. Grossman replied, sotto voce: "Of course the Beatles would like to join Bob Dylan on stage. I should like to fly to the moon." The contracts between Dylan and Grossman were officially dissolved on July 17, 1970, after Dylan realized that Grossman had taken half of his song-publishing rights.

Just months later, Joplin died of a heroin overdose on October 4, 1970. Grossman refused to speak about her death to journalists or colleagues in the music business, leaving his employee Myra Friedman to handle the phone calls that flooded their office. According to Joplin biographer Ellis Amburn, Grossman's "feelings about the loss of his most valuable client are not known." What is known is that in 1974, by which time his only living clients were the members of the Band, he kept busy with Joplin's legacy.

The San Francisco Associated Indemnity Corporation challenged him on his collection of $200,000 from the life insurance policy, which led to a bizarre civil trial in the spring of that year, in which the insurer tried to prove that the singer's death was a suicide, not an accidental overdose as had been determined by Dr. Thomas Noguchi. Grossman testified that he had never known the extent of Joplin's substance abuse when she was alive, and that he secured the accidental death policy "with air crashes in mind." He won the case and collected $112,000. In 1974, he also helped Howard Alk create the feature-length documentary Janis, locating and using black-and-white film footage in which the singer says she is satisfied with Grossman as her manager.

Over his career, Grossman's client list included Todd Rundgren, Odetta; Peter, Paul and Mary; John Lee Hooker; Ian and Sylvia; Phil Ochs (early in his career); Gordon Lightfoot; Richie Havens; the Pozo Seco Singers; the Band; the Electric Flag; Jesse Winchester; and Janis Joplin.

=== Bearsville Studio and Bearsville Records ===
In 1969, Grossman established the Bearsville Recording Studio near Woodstock, and in 1970 he founded Bearsville Records, which evolved from his brief partnership with the Ampex company to establish a record label of the same name. Although that venture was short-lived—Todd Rundgren's debut solo album Runt was one of its few successful releases—it led to the establishment of Grossman's own Bearsville Records label, which was originally distributed through Ampex, and then by Warner Bros. Records. April 1972, Grossman attended a launch party in London hosted by Kinney (WEA), set to distribute the Bearsville label in the UK, with initial album releases by Todd Rundgren, Lazarus and Foghat.

In addition to Rundgren's solo recordings and those of his band Utopia, the label also recorded Jesse Winchester, Foghat, Gil Evans, Paul Butterfield, Sparks, Felix Cavaliere, Randy Vanwarmer, Lazarus, Jesse Frederick, Roger Powell, NRBQ and the dB's. When Michael Friedman joined the Grossman office, he brought Rundgren with him and signed him to a management contract with Grossman. This was soon after leaving his original group Nazz and during the early 1970s Rundgren worked extensively on record production projects, either for the Bearsville label or for Grossman's other clients. It was Grossman who recommended Rundgren to Robbie Robertson of the Band as the engineer on an album by Jesse Winchester, which in turn led to Rundgren working on the Band's third LP Stage Fright. Rundgren also worked briefly on the early Pearl sessions with Janis Joplin, but these came to nothing and the project was subsequently taken over by Paul A. Rothchild. Joplin's Rundgren-produced recording of the song "One Night Stand" from March 28, 1970 stayed in a vault for more than a decade, then became part of her posthumous Farewell Song album.

The Bearsville label continued into the early 1980s, folding in 1984, two years before Grossman's death. Bearsville Studios became Rundgren's recording base through the late 1970s and 1980s and was used by a slew of top-line American and international acts.

=== Management style ===
Grossman had a reputation for aggressiveness in both his method of acquiring clients and the handling of their careers. That aggression was based in large measure on Grossman's faith in his own aesthetic judgments. Grossman charged his clients 25 percent commission (industry standards were 15 percent). He is quoted as saying, "Every time you talk to me you're ten percent smarter than before. So I just add ten percent on to what all the dummies charge for nothing."

In negotiations, one of Grossman's favorite techniques was silence. Musician manager Charlie Rothschild said of Grossman, "He would simply stare at you and say nothing. He wouldn't volunteer any information, and that would drive people crazy. They would keep talking to fill the void, and say anything. He had a remarkable gift for tipping the balance of power in his favor."

In his autobiography, Chronicles: Volume One, Dylan describes first encountering Grossman at the Gaslight cafe: "He looked like Sydney Greenstreet from the film The Maltese Falcon, had an enormous presence, always dressed in a conventional suit and tie, and he sat at his corner table. Usually when he talked, his voice was loud like the booming of war drums. He didn't talk so much as growl."

Grossman sometimes appeared treacherously devoted to his clients' satisfaction. While wooing Joan Baez into representation, Grossman is quoted as saying, "Look, what do you like? Just tell me what do you like? I can get it for you. I can get anything you want. Who do you want? Just tell me. I'll get you anybody you want."

Because Grossman was committed to commercial success for his clients, and was frequently surrounded by socialist enthusiasts of the American folk-music revival, his manner could generate hostility. This hostility is illustrated by this description of Grossman's presence in the Greenwich Village folk scene by Dylan biographer and critic Michael Gray: "He was a pudgy man with derisive eyes, with a regular table at Gerde's Folk City from which he surveyed the scene in silence, and many people loathed him. In a milieu of New Left reformers and folkie idealists campaigning for a better world, Albert Grossman was a breadhead, seen to move serenely and with deadly purpose like a barracuda circling shoals of fish."

=== In film ===
In the documentary film chronicling Dylan's 1965 tour of the United Kingdom, Dont Look Back, Grossman can be seen constantly protecting his client, sometimes aggressively confronting people he thinks are disrespectful to Dylan. In one memorable scene, he works with musical entrepreneur Tito Burns to extract a good price for Dylan's appearance on BBC One television. The director of Dont Look Back, D. A. Pennebaker, said of Grossman's management tactics, "I think Albert was one of the few people that saw Dylan's worth very early on, and played it absolutely without equivocation or any kind of compromise."

There are two interesting comments on Grossman in Martin Scorsese's film No Direction Home. One is Dylan's: "He was kind of like a Colonel Tom Parker figure... all immaculately dressed, every time you see him. You could smell him coming." The other is John Cohen's: "I don't think Albert manipulated Bob, because Bob was weirder than Albert."

In the 2007 Bob Dylan biopic I'm Not There, Grossman was represented as the fictitious character Norman, played by Mark Camacho. In the film, Norman makes many of the remarks spoken by Grossman in Dont Look Back, at one point saying to an English hotel manager, "And you, sir, are one of the dumbest assholes and most stupid persons I've ever spoken to in my life". He was also briefly portrayed as the manager of the fictional Bob Dylan (Hayden Christensen as Billy Quinn) in the 2006 film Factory Girl.

In the 2013 film Inside Llewyn Davis by the Coen brothers, F. Murray Abraham portrays a fictional character named Bud Grossman, who owns the Gate of Horn folk club in Chicago, the same name as Albert Grossman's Chicago club. In the film, fictional folk singer Llewyn Davis (played by Oscar Isaac) auditions for Bud Grossman, who replies: "I don't see a lot of money here." This comment refers to the experience of Dave Van Ronk, who recounted a similar audition for Grossman, who then asked: "Do you know who works here? Big Bill Broonzy works here. Josh White works here. Now tell me why I should hire you?" After this comment, Grossman offers Davis a part in a band he is about to put together, consisting of two guys and a girl, which one journalist notes is "a reference to Peter, Paul, and Mary, the trio that Albert Grossman put together in 1961—ultimately choosing Noel Paul Stookey as the third member of the group, rather than Van Ronk, whom he also considered." Davis turns down the offer.

In the 2024 Bob Dylan biopic A Complete Unknown, Grossman is portrayed by Dan Fogler.

== Personal life and death ==
Grossman married Sally Buehler, whom he had met while she was working as a waitress, in 1964. They settled in Woodstock, New York.

Grossman died of a heart attack on January 25, 1986, while flying on the Concorde, aged 59. He was en route to London and was planning to make a trip to Cannes, France, to attend a music convention. He is buried behind his own Bearsville Theater near Woodstock, New York.
