= Bob Dylan's 115th Dream =

Song by Bob Dylan

Song by Bob Dylan

from the album Bringing It All Back Home
- Released: March 22, 1965
- Recorded: January 13–14, 1965
- Studio: Columbia Recording, New York City
- Genre: Folk rock; blues rock; talking blues
- Length: 6:32
- Label: Columbia
- Songwriter: Bob Dylan
- Producer: Tom Wilson

"Bob Dylan's 115th Dream" is a song by Bob Dylan, released on his fifth album, Bringing It All Back Home. In 2005, Mojo magazine rated the song as the 68th greatest Bob Dylan song.

== Themes ==
The title alludes to an earlier Dylan song, "Bob Dylan's Dream", released in 1963. The song is a satirical and surrealistic story that jumbles together historical and literary and narrative references from the voyages of Columbus to the Mayflower to Moby Dick to the present day. The narrator calls his ship's captain "Captain Arab", referring to Captain Ahab from Moby-Dick several times during the telling of the tale.

Historian Sean Wilentz described the song as "a six-and-a-half-minute roller-coaster ride, more joyful than scary" in which Dylan constructs a manic journey through American history: "a hipster sailor travels across a historical landscape where it’s sometimes 1620, sometimes 1851, sometimes 1492, but always 1965 as well—and could just as easily be America today, which is really the point." For Wilentz, the song amounts to a portrait of America as "a newfound land that is frantic, exasperating, jumbled, and irrational beyond the point of absurdity".

Wilentz has suggested that Dylan's earlier song "Motorpsycho Nitemare" can be heard as a first draft of the song, having been released on Another Side of Bob Dylan in August of 1964. Wilentz argues "115th Dream" shares "an identical melody" with "Motorpsycho Nitemare" and both songs revolve around a hapless traveling salesman who is constantly "getting in and out of jams".

== Recording ==
Dylan recorded an acoustic version on January 13, 1965, the first day of the Bringing It All Back Home sessions. He recorded what would become the final album version a day later, with Bobby Gregg on drums, Bill Lee on bass, and Paul Griffin on piano. He did not perform the song live until October 13, 1988, then went on to play it during the final six concerts of his 1988 tour.

The track commences with an early take of Dylan beginning to play the song alone before producer Tom Wilson is heard bursting into laughter and signalling for a start-over. The track is then transitioned into a take played by the full band the next day. The song contains eleven verses.

== Covers ==
The song was covered by Taj Mahal on the Dylan tribute album Chimes of Freedom.
