= Outlaw Blues (Bob Dylan song) =

Song by Bob Dylan

from the album Bringing It All Back Home
- Released: March 22, 1965
- Recorded: January 14, 1965
- Studio: Columbia Recording, New York City
- Genre: Folk rock; electric blues; proto punk
- Length: 3:05
- Label: Columbia
- Songwriter: Bob Dylan
- Producer: Tom Wilson

"Outlaw Blues" is a song by Bob Dylan, recorded on January 14, 1965. It was originally released on Dylan's fifth studio album, Bringing It All Back Home.

== Recording ==
An acoustic version of the song, recorded the day before the album track, was released in 2005 as part of the Three Song Sampler EP, which contains outtakes from the soundtrack of the Martin Scorsese Dylan biographical film No Direction Home, and was eventually released on The Bootleg Series Vol. 12: The Cutting Edge 1965–1966.

An unusual aspect of this song is that Dylan overdubbed his harmonica part over his lead vocals, rather than alternate between voice and harmonica.

== Live performance ==
On September 20, 2007, Dylan played this song live in concert for the first time during a show in Nashville. He was joined onstage for the performance by Jack White of The White Stripes.

On January 25, 2025, actor Timothée Chalamet performed a medley of "Outlaw Blues" and "Three Angels" on Saturday Night Live while promoting his film A Complete Unknown.
