= Outlaw Blues =

1977 film by Richard T. Heffron

- Theatrical release poster
- Directed by: Richard T. Heffron
- Screenplay by: Bill L. Norton
- Produced by: Steve Tisch
- Starring: Peter Fonda; Susan Saint James
- Cinematography: Jules Brenner
- Edited by: Scott Conrad; Danford B. Greene
- Music by: Charles Bernstein; Bruce Langhorne
- Production company: Sequoia Pictures
- Distributed by: Warner Bros. Pictures
- Release date: August 15, 1977 (USA)
- Running time: 100 minutes
- Country: United States
- Language: English
- Budget: $2 million

Outlaw Blues is a 1977 American drama film directed by Richard T. Heffron and starring Peter Fonda and Susan Saint James. Written by Bill L. Norton, the film is about an ex-convict and songwriter trying to break into the music business in Austin, Texas. The soundtrack of the film includes a title song written by John Oates and three songs by Hoyt Axton, with some of the songs sung by Peter Fonda.

== Plot ==
Nearing release, convict Bobby Ogden is trying to get his life straight and his career going as a country and western singer. Bobby shows off some of his tunes to Nashville star Garland Dupree. Dupree uses one of his songs "Outlaw Blues" for himself with no credit to Bobby. Bobby confronts Dupree and when Dupree pulls a gun on him, he accidentally shoots himself in the ensuing struggle. Of course, Dupree tells everyone that Bobby shot him. Now Bobby's on the run, with only Dupree's recently fired back up singer Tina Waters believing him. The pair flee together, as Bobby becomes an underground hero who is accepted as the man who actually wrote the hit, while being put on the law enforcement's most wanted list.

== Cast ==
- Peter Fonda as Bobby Ogden
- Susan Saint James as Tina Waters
- John Crawford as Chief Buzz Cavenaugh
- James T. Callahan as Garland Dupree
- Michael Lerner as Hatch
- Steve Fromholz as Elroy
- Richard Lockmiller as Associate Warden
- Matt Clark as Billy Bob
- Jan Rita Cobler as Cathy Moss
- Gene Rader as Leon Warback
- Curtis Harris as Big Guy
- Jerry Greene as Disc Jockey
- Dave Helfert as Anchorman
- Jeffrey Friedman (politician) as Newsman
- James N. Harrell as Cop Chauffeur

== Production ==
=== Filming locations ===
Outlaw Blues was filmed on location in Austin, Texas, and Huntsville, Texas.

== Reception ==
In his review in The New York Times, film critic A. H. Weiler found the film to be "pleasantly palatable if not especially nutritious" and "an amiable, lilting, if lightweight, diversion." Weiler acknowledges that the cast "make the most of a musical genre that has millions of devoted fans."
