= Maggie's Farm =

- 1967 Dutch picture sleeve

Single by Bob Dylan

from the album Bringing It All Back Home
- B-side: "On the Road Again"
- Released: June 1965
- Recorded: January 15, 1965
- Studio: Columbia, New York City
- Genre: Blues rock; folk rock; proto-punk
- Length: 3:51
- Label: Columbia
- Songwriter: Bob Dylan
- Producer: Tom Wilson

Bob Dylan singles chronology
"Subterranean Homesick Blues" (1965)	"Maggie's Farm" (1965)	"Like a Rolling Stone" (1965)

"Maggie's Farm" is a song written by Bob Dylan, recorded on January 15, 1965, and released on the album Bringing It All Back Home on March 22 of that year. Like many other Dylan songs of the 1965–66 period, "Maggie's Farm" is based on electric blues. It was released as a single in the United Kingdom on June 4, 1965, and peaked at No. 22 on the chart. Dylan only needed one take to record the song, as may be heard on the exhaustive 18-disc Collector's Edition of The Bootleg Series Vol. 12: The Cutting Edge 1965–1966, which includes every alternate take recorded during Dylan's 1965–1966 sessions but only the one version of "Maggie's Farm". A live version of the song recorded in Fort Collins, Colorado was included as the opening track of Dylan’s 1976 live album Hard Rain.

== Lyrics ==
The lyrics of the song follow a straightforward blues structure, with the opening line of each verse ("I ain't gonna work...") sung twice, then repeated at the end of the verse. The third to fifth lines of each verse elaborate on and explain the sentiment expressed in the verse's opening/closing lines.

== Critical response ==
"Maggie's Farm" is described by Salon.com critic Bill Wyman as "a loping, laconic look at the service industry." Music critic Tim Riley described it as the "counterculture's war cry," but he also notes that the song has been interpreted as "a rock star's gripe to his record company, a songwriter's gripe to his publisher, and a singer-as-commodity's gripe to his audience-as-market." However, AllMusic's William Ruhlmann also notes that "in between the absurdities, the songwriter describes what sound like real problems. 'I got a head full of ideas/That are drivin' me insane,' he sings in the first verse, and given Dylan's prolific writing at the time, that's not hard to believe. In the last verse, he sings, 'I try my best/To be just like I am/But everybody wants you/To be just like them,' another comment that sounds sincere."

== Newport Folk Festival 1965 ==
"Maggie's Farm" is well known for being at the center of the fervor that surrounded Dylan after his electric set at the 1965 Newport Folk Festival; it was that set's performance of "Maggie's Farm," much faster and more aggressive than on the Bringing It All Back Home recording and featuring prominent lead electric guitar by Mike Bloomfield, that caused the most controversy. The festival's production manager Joe Boyd claimed that "that first note of 'Maggie's Farm' was the loudest thing anybody had ever heard." It is still unknown what exactly was the biggest source of the controversy, with accounts of the event differing from individual to individual. Though Dylan's move from acoustic folk to electric rock had been extremely controversial, many accounts suggest the problem was largely due to poor sound. Pete Seeger, who is often cited as one of the main opponents to Dylan at Newport 1965, claimed in 2005:

There are reports of me being anti-him going electric at the '65 Newport Folk festival, but that's wrong. I was the MC that night. He was singing 'Maggie's Farm' and you couldn't understand a word because the mic was distorting his voice. I ran to the mixing desk and said, 'Fix the sound, it's terrible!' The guy said 'No, this is what the young people want.' And I did say that if I had an axe I'd cut the cable! But I wanted to hear the words. I didn't mind him going electric.

Singer Eric Von Schmidt has a similar recollection of the event: "Whoever was controlling the mics messed it up. You couldn't hear Dylan. It looked like he was singing with the volume off."

Also, Al Kooper, Dylan's organist at the concert, claims:

The reason they booed is because he only played for 15 minutes and everybody else played for 45 minutes to an hour, and he was the headliner of the festival. [...] The fact that he was playing electric...I don't know. The Paul Butterfield Blues Band (who had played earlier) had played electric and the crowd didn't seem too incensed.

However, the style of the music features heavily in several accounts such as that of Elektra Records founder Jac Holzman: "Backstage, Alan Lomax was bellowing that this was a folk festival, you just didn't have amplified instruments."

The "Maggie's Farm" performance from Newport was featured and discussed extensively in the 2005 Martin Scorsese documentary No Direction Home and released on its accompanying album, The Bootleg Series Vol. 7: No Direction Home: The Soundtrack. Media reviews of the soundtrack were overwhelmingly positive towards the "Maggie's Farm" performance, yielding such descriptions as "blistering" and "remarkably tight, and downright spine-tingling. You can sense Dylan and the band feeding off their collective nervous energy." The Newport performance was also included in Murray Lerner's film The Other Side of the Mirror.

== Cover version ==
An early cover version was by Solomon Burke, "one of the first black singers to record a Bob Dylan song", who released it in 1965 just prior to Dylan's own single release, as the flip side of his "Tonight's the Night" (Atlantic 2288). Burke's version peaked at No. 2 on the R&B charts, and No. 28 on the Pop Charts.

== General and cited references ==
- Blake, Mark, ed. (2008). Dylan: Visions, Portraits and Back Pages. DK Publishing. ISBN 978-0-7566-3725-5.
- Gilliland, John (1969). "Ballad in Plain D: An introduction to the Bob Dylan era" (audio). Pop Chronicles. University of North Texas Libraries.
- Gray, Michael (2006). The Bob Dylan Encyclopedia. Continuum International. ISBN 0-8264-6933-7.
- Haynes, Todd (Director) (2007), I'm Not There, The Weinstein Co.
- Heylin, Clinton (2003). Bob Dylan: Behind the Shades Revisited. Perennial Currents. ISBN 0-06-052569-X.
- Ruhlmann, William. "Maggie's Farm". Allmusic.
- Scorsese, Martin (2005), No Direction Home, Emerging Pictures, ISBN 1-4157-1389-8
- Shelton, Robert (1986). No Direction Home: The Life and Music of Bob Dylan. Ballantine. ISBN 0-345-34721-8.
- Sounes, Howard (2001). Down the Highway, The Life of Bob Dylan. Grove Press. ISBN 0-8021-1686-8.
