= Pezzati =

Pezzati is an Italian surname. Notable people with the surname include:

- Jeff Pezzati (born 1960), American punk rock musician;
- Mary Rotolo (née Pezzati; 1910–1990), American writer and political activist;
- Pietro Pezzati (artist) (1828–1890), Italian religious painter;
- Peter S. Pezzati (1902–1993), American portrait painter.
