= Rotolo =

Rotolo is an Italian surname. Notable people with the surname include:

- Antonio Rotolo (b. 1946), Sicilian mafiosi, an important member of Cosa Nostra
- Carla Rotolo (1941–2014), friend of Bob Dylan and sister of Suze Rotolo
- Mary Pezzati Rotolo (1910–1990), author and activist, mother of Suze and Carla Rotolo
- Stefania Rotolo (1951–1981), Italian singer and TV presenter
- Suze Rotolo (1943–2011), one of Bob Dylan's early girlfriends
- Tamara Rotolo, Californian mother of Jazmin Grace Grimaldi by Albert II, Prince of Monaco

== Other ==
- Palazzo Rotolo, a 19th century historical building in Lercara Friddi, Sicily
- Rotolo (Italian for "roll"), an Italian pasta dish in which a filling is rolled up like a roulade in pasta sheets, poached, sliced, and then served.
