= Ruotolo =

Ruotolo is an Italian surname. Notable people with the surname include:

- Andrew Ruotolo (1952–1995), American politician
- Dolindo Ruotolo (1882–1970), Italian Roman Catholic priest
- Gennaro Ruotolo (born 1967), Italian footballer and manager
- Kade Ruotolo (born 2003), American grappler and youngest-ever ADCC champion
- Onorio Ruotolo (1888–1966), Italian sculptor
- Patrick Ruotolo (born 1995), American baseball player
- Raffaele Ruotolo (born 1965), American soccer player
- Riccardo Ruotolo (1928–2012), Italian Roman Catholic bishop
- Sandro Ruotolo (born 1955), Italian journalist and politician
- Tye Ruotolo (born 2003), American grappler and twin brother of Kade

== See also ==
- Ruotolo Peak, mountain in Antarctica
- Rotolo
- Otolo
