= Pietro Pezzati =

Pietro or Peter Pezzati may refer to:

- Pietro Pezzati (artist) (1828–1898), Italian mural painter
- Peter S. Pezzati (1902–1993), aka Pietro Pezzati, American portrait painter
