= A Complete Unknown =

2024 film by James Mangold

- Theatrical release poster
- Directed by: James Mangold
- Screenplay by: James Mangold; Jay Cocks
- Based on: Dylan Goes Electric! by Elijah Wald
- Produced by: Peter Jaysen; James Mangold; Alex Heineman; Bob Bookman; Alan Gasmer; Jeff Rosen; Timothée Chalamet; Fred Berger
- Starring: Timothée Chalamet; Edward Norton; Elle Fanning; Monica Barbaro; Boyd Holbrook; Scoot McNairy
- Cinematography: Phedon Papamichael
- Edited by: Andrew Buckland; Scott Morris
- Production companies: Searchlight Pictures; Veritas Entertainment Group; White Water; Range Media Partners; The Picture Company; Turnpike Films
- Distributed by: Searchlight Pictures
- Release dates: December 10, 2024 (Dolby Theatre); December 25, 2024 (United States)
- Running time: 141 minutes
- Country: United States
- Language: English
- Budget: $50–70 million
- Box office: $140.5 million

A Complete Unknown is a 2024 American biographical film about the early career of American singer-songwriter Bob Dylan, directed by James Mangold, written by Mangold and Jay Cocks, and loosely based on the 2015 book Dylan Goes Electric! by Elijah Wald. A Complete Unknown examines the period of 1961–1965, beginning with Dylan's start as an American folk singer, and ending with his controversial use of electric instruments at the 1965 Newport Folk Festival. Dylan is portrayed by Timothée Chalamet, who also produced the film. Edward Norton, Elle Fanning, Monica Barbaro, Boyd Holbrook, Dan Fogler, Norbert Leo Butz, Eriko Hatsune, Big Bill Morganfield, Will Harrison, and Scoot McNairy appear in supporting roles.

A Complete Unknown premiered at the Dolby Theatre in Los Angeles on December 10, 2024, and was released in the United States by Searchlight Pictures on December 25. It grossed $140.5 million worldwide and received generally positive reviews. It was named one of the top ten films of 2024 by the American Film Institute and the National Board of Review. The National Board of Review also awarded Fanning Best Supporting Actress.

The film earned eight nominations at the 97th Academy Awards, including Best Picture, Best Director, Best Actor (Chalamet), Best Supporting Actor (Norton), and Best Supporting Actress (Barbaro). It received three nominations at the 82nd Golden Globe Awards (including Best Motion Picture – Drama), four at the 31st Screen Actors Guild Awards (winning Best Actor for Chalamet), and six at the British Academy Film Awards (including Best Film).

== Plot ==
In 1961, Bob Dylan hitchhikes to New York City to meet his music idol, Woody Guthrie, who is dying slowly of Huntington's disease. Dylan meets Guthrie in the hospital with Guthrie's friend, the folk singer and activist Pete Seeger. Dylan performs "Song to Woody," a song he had written for Guthrie, impressing Guthrie and Seeger, who invites Dylan to stay with his family, introducing the young musician to New York City's folk scene.

Following a performance by Joan Baez, Seeger introduces Dylan at an open mic club attended by industry executives. Dylan flirts with Baez and impresses the crowd, prompting the music manager Albert Grossman to take him on as a client. Dylan begins work on an album but is forced by his label to record mostly covers and traditional folk songs. The record's sales are poor, frustrating Dylan.

Dylan meets Sylvie Russo at a church folk music night, charming her with his contrarian opinions and tales of working at a carnival. The two begin a relationship, and he moves into her apartment. Before she leaves on a 2-month college trip to Rome, they argue; Sylvie is upset by his aloof and opaque nature, especially about his past. Despite this, she encourages him to record his original music.

Influenced by political and social unrest, such as the Cuban Missile Crisis and John F. Kennedy's assassination, Dylan produces a series of socially conscious folk songs. This draws significant attention, including from Joan Baez and Johnny Cash. Dylan's album begins to sell well, and he receives his first royalty check for $10,000. Baez and Bob begin an affair and collaboration, while Cash becomes his "pen pal."

Dylan brings Sylvie to the 1964 Newport Folk Festival, hoping to rekindle his relationship with her. Upon watching Dylan's duet with Baez on "It Ain't Me Babe", Sylvie realizes she will never be comfortable in their relationship and breaks off their relationship.

Having achieved fame but not artistic freedom, Dylan laments that he is beholden to the expectations of the industry and fans. On tour with Baez, Dylan and Baez argue over his ego and his refusal to play his popular songs instead of new material, and Dylan walks offstage mid-performance.

Dylan experiments with electric guitar and a young rock band, a controversial direction within the folk scene. He pieces together his band and begins recording Highway 61 Revisited. Dylan's new direction concerns some on the planning committee for the upcoming 1965 Newport Folk Festival, as they hired him to headline the event.

The committee demands Dylan play only folk music, and Seeger reminds Dylan that his own life's work is on the line. An intoxicated Johnny Cash encourages Dylan to play the electric show, and Dylan goes through with his plan. The crowd reacts with vitriol. The committee, including Seeger, attempts to cut the sound but is stopped by Grossman and Seeger's wife Toshi. Dylan refuses a request from the festival organizers to perform a folk song as an encore but relents when Cash offers him his own acoustic guitar.

The next morning, as Dylan is leaving Newport, Baez catches him and remarks that he has won the freedom he wanted. Dylan visits Guthrie and listens to a recording of "So Long, It's Been Good to Know Yuh," one of Guthrie's songs, before leaving town on his motorcycle.

Onscreen text reveals that Dylan released Highway 61 Revisited a month later, which topped the charts. Seeger and Dylan reunited in 1968, and Seeger continued to play folk music and advocate for civil rights until his death in 2014, as did Baez. Since 1965, Dylan has released 55 albums and is the only songwriter in history to be awarded the Nobel Prize for Literature, though he did not attend the ceremony.

== Cast ==
- Timothée Chalamet as Bob Dylan
- Edward Norton as Pete Seeger
- Elle Fanning as Sylvie Russo
  - Russo is based on Suze Rotolo, Dylan's girlfriend at the time.
- Monica Barbaro as Joan Baez
- Boyd Holbrook as Johnny Cash
- Dan Fogler as Albert Grossman
- Norbert Leo Butz as Alan Lomax
- Eriko Hatsune as Toshi Seeger
- Big Bill Morganfield as Jesse Moffette
- Will Harrison as Bob Neuwirth
- Scoot McNairy as Woody Guthrie
- P. J. Byrne as Harold Leventhal
- Michael Chernus as Theodore Bikel
- Charlie Tahan as Al Kooper
- Ryan Harris Brown as Mark Spoelstra
- Eli Brown as Mike Bloomfield
- Nick Pupo as Peter Yarrow
- Andre Chez Lewis as Paul Griffin
- Laura Kariuki as Becka
- Stephen Carter Carlsen as Paul Stookey
- Eric Berryman as Tom Wilson
- David Alan Basche as John Hammond
- Joe Tippett as Dave Van Ronk
- James Austin Johnson as Gerdes M.C.
- Kayli Carter as Maria Muldaur
- Sarah King as Barbara Dane
- Alaina Surgener as Gena Russo
- Will Price as Joe Boyd
- Joshua Henry as Brownie McGhee
- Molly Jobe as CBS Receptionist

== Production ==
=== Pre-production ===
Producers Fred Berger and Alex Heineman started discussing the film in 2017, as they did not own any rights to Dylan's story they met with literary agent Bob Bookman, who introduced them to longtime Dylan manager Jeff Rosen. Heineman and Berger were looking for the lead and reached out to the team of, at the time up-coming actor, Timothée Chalamet, Chalamet had just finished filming Call Me By Your Name (2017) and the producers were struck by his versatility and physical resemblance to the artist. The actor was reluctant about taking the role as he was not familiar enough with Dylan and had to be convinced by his agent Brian Swardstrom to attend the meeting. Berger and Heineman met with Rosen every three months to develop the project, Rosen had previously written a script with Jay Cocks in 2011 for HBO but production had stalled. They took that script and partnered with Rosen, Bookman and Searchlight Pictures to produce the film. Director James Mangold came on board after a meeting with Searchlight's producers en route to the 46th Telluride Film Festival. Mangold was interested in doing another music biopic and read Cocks' script on the plane; he liked it so much that he started writing without a deal in place. Mangold's involvement was key in convincing Chalamet to finally sign on to the film.

In January 2020, Mangold was announced to be writing and directing a biopic about Bob Dylan, specifically centered on the controversy surrounding his switch to electric guitars, with Chalamet cast as Dylan. At this time, the film was referred to as Going Electric. By October, cinematographer Phedon Papamichael stated that the ongoing COVID-19 pandemic had put the project into doubt. Nevertheless, Chalamet learned to play the guitar and harmonica, and spent time researching Dylan during the pandemic, visiting the former homes of Dylan in New York City and consulting director Joel Coen during this time. Mangold had also met with Dylan several times about the film, and stated that he annotated the script while also providing notes to Chalamet. The finished script was partly based on Elijah Wald's book Dylan Goes Electric! as well as on Mangold's talk with Dylan, and Dylan himself also added lines and a scene to the film. In an October 2023 interview, Chalamet stated he was working with the same team of vocal and movement coaches that worked with Austin Butler for his performance in Elvis (2022). Dylan's life had previously been portrayed before in Todd Haynes's biopic I'm Not There (2007), which presented more of an experimental aspect using six different actors depicting various facets of Dylan's public personas.

In November 2022, Chalamet stated he was still attached to the film and actively preparing for it, the project having gained momentum again after stalling. In February 2023, the film was officially titled A Complete Unknown and Mangold was to begin work on the project following his obligations to Indiana Jones and the Dial of Destiny (2023). Monica Barbaro entered final negotiations to portray Joan Baez in April. In May, Elle Fanning was cast to play Sylvie Russo, a character based on Suze Rotolo, with Mangold announcing Benedict Cumberbatch would portray Pete Seeger in the film. Barbaro was also confirmed for her role, beginning singing and guitar lessons to prepare. Mangold stated in July that the film was not necessarily focused on being a Dylan biopic, but an ensemble drama in the vein of Robert Altman films. Boyd Holbrook and Nick Offerman would also join the cast at that time, though Offerman was later replaced by Norbert Leo Butz. In October, P. J. Byrne was noted as being cast. Holbrook appeared as Johnny Cash, whose life story had previously been told by Mangold in Walk the Line (2005) with Joaquin Phoenix in the role; Mangold admitted to casting Holbrook due to their past collaborations and feeling the film could reveal another side of Cash's life, as his previous biopic focused on his origin story. In January 2024, Edward Norton was revealed to portray the role of Seeger, replacing Cumberbatch, who left due to scheduling issues. Matthew Rhys also auditioned for the role before Norton was directly offered it. Additional casting was announced in March.

=== Filming ===
In April 2023, Mangold stated that principal photography would likely begin in August 2023 in New York City and Montreal, but filming was postponed in July due to the 2023 SAG-AFTRA strike. By early 2024, filming was scheduled to begin in late March 2024, and was expected to occur throughout New Jersey, with scenes set in New York City being filmed in Jersey City and Hoboken. Filming began on March 16. Production wrapped by late June 2024.

Norton said that during the three months of principal photography, Chalamet was "relentless" in staying immersed in his role as Dylan, not having contact with friends or visitors on set. Chalamet was often referred to as "Bob" on set by Mangold and was listed as "Bob Dylan" on the set call sheet. Chalamet abstained from cell phone use allowing him to fully engage in the character without modern distraction.

=== Music ===
According to producer Fred Berger, Chalamet sang 40 Dylan songs in the film while also playing guitars and harmonicas. All performances were recorded live while filming; Barbaro, Norton, and Holbrook sang and played their own instruments. Sound engineer Tod Maitland revealed that recording was done with period-appropriate microphones and instruments and without the use of earpieces. Recording for the film occurred at The Village and Sunset Sound in Los Angeles. The music production team had access to almost 16 hours of unreleased Dylan recordings and old Columbia Records notes, which included lists of vintage microphones the artist used. The team collaborated with Gibson, which lent them archival guitars and made recreations, including two custom J-50's.

The soundtrack album for A Complete Unknown was released on December 20, 2024, through Columbia Records. A vinyl edition featuring 16 tracks was released on January 24, 2025, while the CD with 23 tracks was released on February 28. Two songs from the soundtrack were released on December 4, 2024: "Like a Rolling Stone" by Chalamet and "Girl from the North Country" by Chalamet and Barbaro. "A Hard Rain's a-Gonna Fall" has been confirmed as a track on the album, which also includes performances from Norton and Holbrook. The album's track listing also includes "Highway 61 Revisited", "Mr. Tambourine Man", "I Was Young When I Left Home", "Subterranean Homesick Blues", and "The Times They Are a-Changin'". The film additionally features a performance of "Song to Woody". In a January 2025 interview with *ScreenDaily*, director James Mangold explained that when he picked up the project he was “instantly and insatiably hooked by the possibilities” after reading the script about Bob Dylan's early years. He said, “I didn’t even wait to ask whether I could have the movie; I just started looking at the script, voraciously making notes.”

== Biographical accuracy ==
A Complete Unknown is a fictionalized account of Bob Dylan's life covering the period from the time of his arrival in New York in 1961 to the 1965 Newport Folk Festival. In the film, the timeline of events has been compressed or altered, and events have been transposed, amalgamated or simply invented. Individuals known to have been important to Dylan in this period including his future wife Sara Lownds have been omitted, while some characters are fictitious. Dylan himself was revealed to have added at least one unspecified "totally inaccurate" scene into the film.

A major character is introduced as Sylvie Russo, but who is actually based on Suze Rotolo as Dylan had requested that the film not use her real identity. Angie Martoccio of Rolling Stone described the Russo character as "Rotolo in all but name." A number of scenes with her are not based on facts; she did not attend the 1965 Newport Folk Festival with Dylan as she had already long broken up with him. Similarly, a number of scenes depicting Dylan's relationship with Joan Baez are not factual; it did not begin during the 1962 Cuban Missile Crisis but a year later. They also broke up before the 1965 Newport Festival.

Early in the film, Dylan is shown to have first met Pete Seeger and Woody Guthrie in a hospital in New Jersey. This did not happen as depicted; Dylan first met Guthrie at a house in New Jersey (but he did later visit Guthrie many times at the hospital) and only wrote "Song to Woody" after meeting him, while Seeger first met Dylan in Greenwich Village. Dylan also did not appear on Pete Seeger's TV show, and the bluesman Jesse Moffette is an invention. While Johnny Cash and Dylan were longtime pen pals, Cash was not present at the 1965 festival as depicted in the film. Cash did, however, give Dylan his guitar the previous year. The climactic scene of his controversial performance at the 1965 Newport Folk Festival where someone in the audience shouted "Judas!" actually came from a concert in Manchester, England in 1966. The scene where Seeger became so angry over Dylan's performance that he considered using an axe to cut the microphone cables is a recognition of a legend and not a fact.

The director Mangold said that the film is "not a Wikipedia entry", indicating that he did not "feel a fealty to a documentary level of facts". Mangold also said: "It's not really a Bob Dylan biopic. It's a kind of ensemble piece about this moment in time in the early '60s in New York ... and this wanderer who comes in from Minnesota with a fresh name and a fresh outlook on life [and] becomes a star."

== Release ==
The film premiered at the Dolby Theatre in Hollywood on December 10, 2024. It was released by Searchlight Pictures in the United States on December 25, 2024, and was then released in the United Kingdom on January 17, 2025. During its first weekend in UK and Ireland, the film would top the box office. The film would also have a limited IMAX engagement beginning January 3, 2025. It was featured in the Limelight section of the 54th International Film Festival Rotterdam to be screened in February 2025. The film had its theatrical preview in Paris on January 15, 2025. It was released in the rest of France on January 29, 2025.

=== Marketing ===
To promote the film, Levi's announced a capsule collection inspired by Dylan, who often wore the brand's garments during the period reflected in the film. Costume designer Arianne Phillips worked with design director Paul O'Neill on the research, and sourcing of Levi's pieces, to recreate the original outfits worn by Dylan. The guitar company Gibson, from which Dylan sourced most of his instruments, also announced a collection inspired by guitars placed in the movie.

=== Home media ===
A Complete Unknown was released on VOD platforms on February 25, 2025, and on Hulu on March 27, 2025. It was released on 4K Ultra HD Blu-ray and Blu-ray on April 1 by Sony Pictures Home Entertainment. It reached No. 1 on the U.K. Official Film Chart for the week ending May 7, 2025. Nielsen Media Research, which records streaming viewership on certain American television screens, calculated that A Complete Unknown was streamed for 253 million minutes during the week of March 24–30, ranking as the ninth most-streamed film for that period. JustWatch, a guide to streaming content with access to data from more than 45 million users around the world, reported that it was the most-streamed film in the U.S. from April 1–30.

== Reception ==
=== Box office ===
A Complete Unknown grossed $75 million in the United States and Canada, and $65.5 million in other territories, for a worldwide gross of $140.5 million.

In the United States and Canada, A Complete Unknown was released alongside Nosferatu, Babygirl, and The Fire Inside, and was projected to gross around $15 million from 2,835 theaters in its five-day opening weekend. The film made $7.2 million on its first day (including $1.4 million from Christmas Eve previews), and then $4.4 million on its second. It went on to debut to a total of $23.2 million over the five days (including $11.7 million in its three-day opening weekend), beating projections and finishing in sixth. In its second weekend, the film made $8.2 million, bringing its box office total to $41.8 million to surpass The Menu (2022) as the highest-grossing Searchlight title domestically after Disney's acquisition of 21st Century Fox in 2019. The film made a respective $5.1 million, $3.7 million, and $3.1 million in its third, fourth, and fifth weekends.

=== Critical response ===
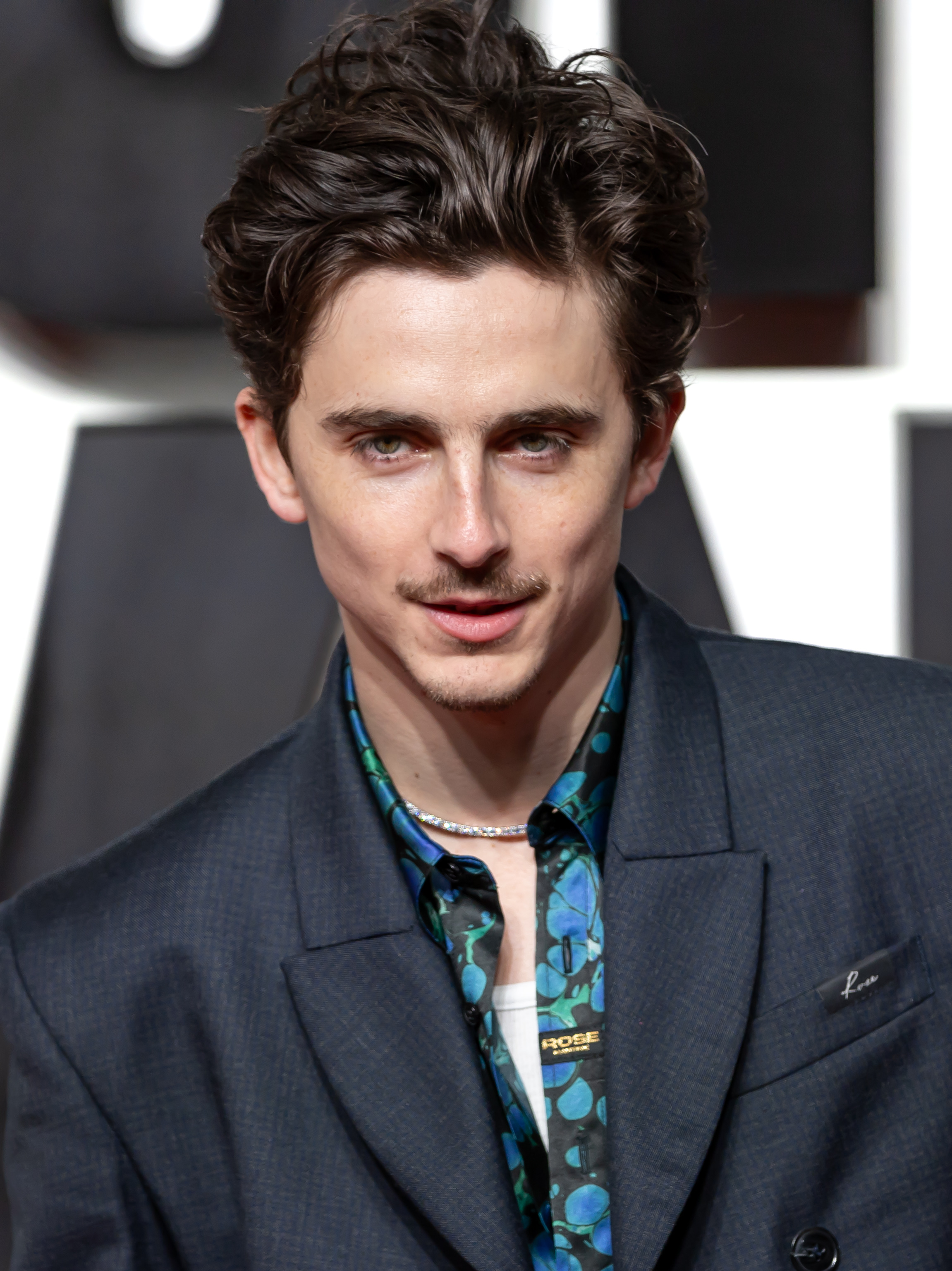
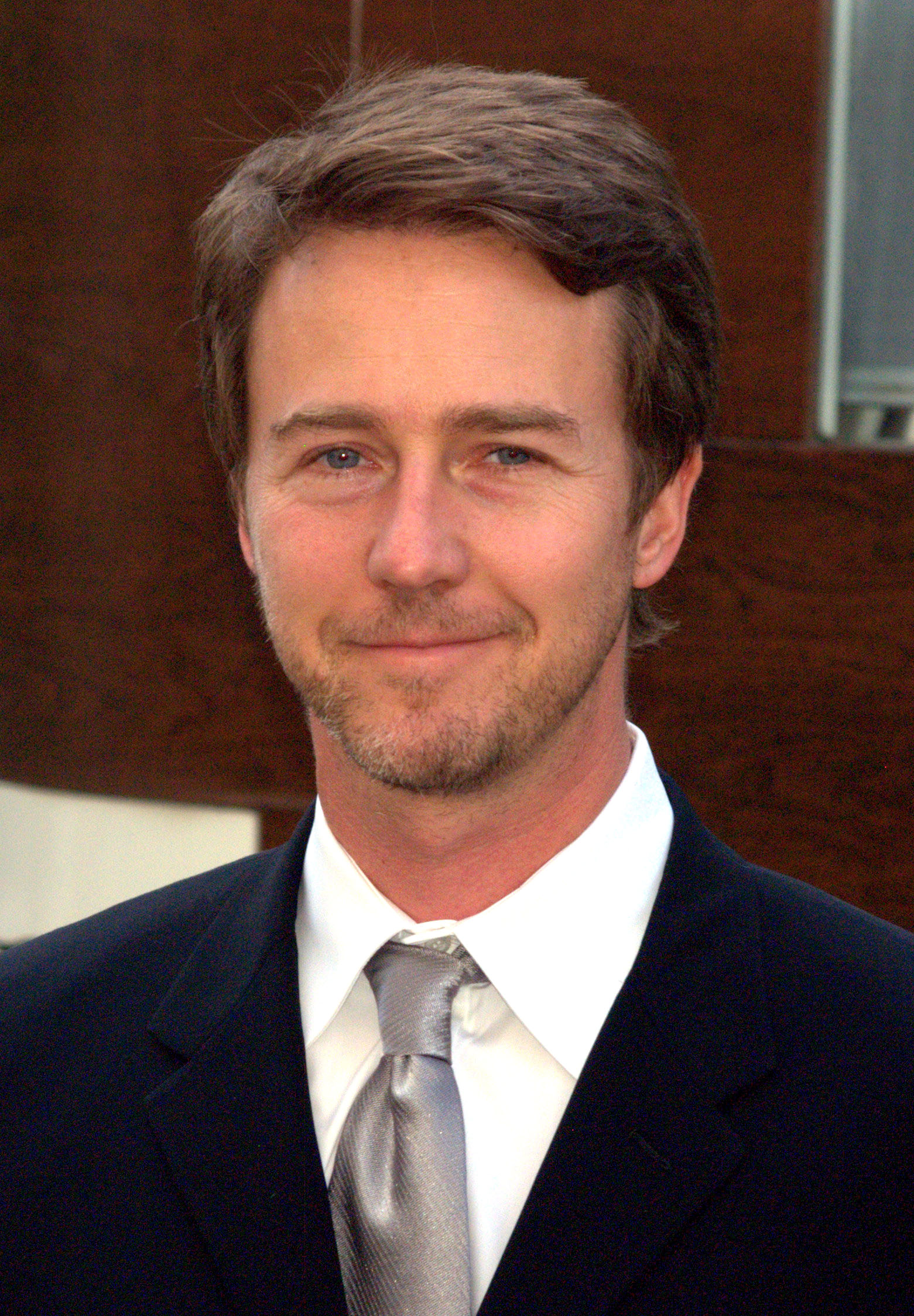
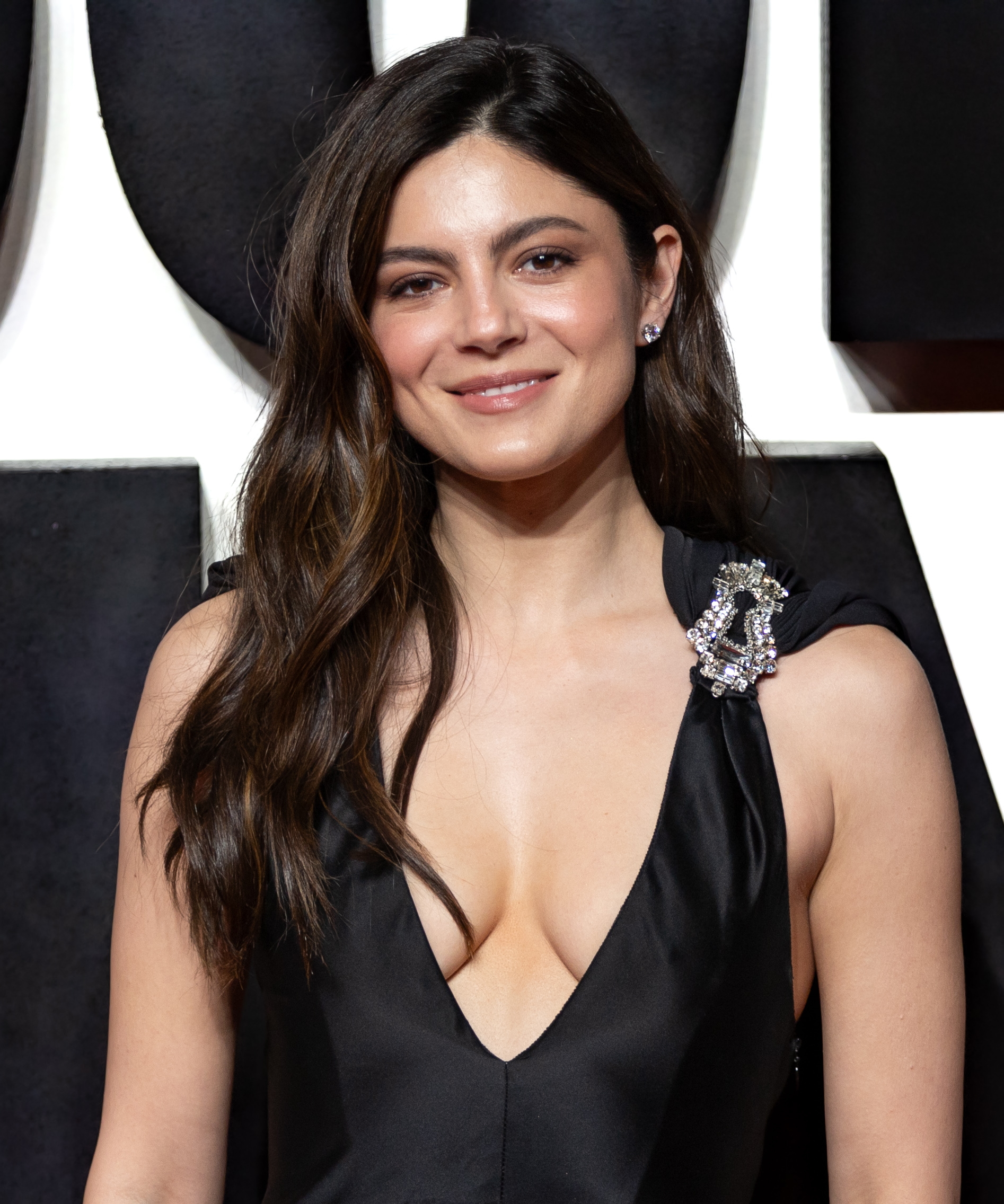
Timothée Chalamet, Edward Norton, and Monica Barbaro garnered critical acclaim for their performances and earned Academy Award nominations for Best Actor, and Best Supporting Actor and Actress.

On the review aggregator website Rotten Tomatoes, 82% of 343 critics' reviews are positive. The website's consensus reads: "Charged up by Timothée Chalamet's electric performance, this ballad of Bob Dylan might not get under the enigmatic artist's skin, but will make you feel like you've spent time in his company." Metacritic, which uses a weighted average, assigned the film a score of 70 out of 100, based on 59 critics, indicating "generally favorable" reviews. Audiences polled by CinemaScore gave the film an average grade of "A" on an A+ to F scale, while those surveyed by PostTrak gave it a 93% overall positive score, with 76% saying they would "definitely recommend" it.

In a review for RogerEbert.com, Brian Tallerico awarded the film 3½ out of 4 stars. He praised the "solid performances, unshowy direction, and organic editing". Peter Bradshaw of The Guardian praised the performances and gave the film five out of five, calling Chalamet "hypnotic". Writing for The Wall Street Journal, Kyle Smith also applauded Chalamet's ability to capture different facets of Dylan's personality, including his "supercilious air" and his creative genius. Smith especially liked the duet of the song "It Ain't Me Babe" between Barbaro and Chalamet, describing it "as spectacular". Filmmakers William Goldenberg, Paul Schrader, and Oliver Stone praised the film.

John Nugent of Empire gave the film three out of five stars; he praised the performances, but felt the film "plays it safe" and "struggles to find something fresh to say". Richard Brody of The New Yorker felt it was a hollow representation of Dylan's career, writing, "The movie offers answers that range from empty to artificial, leaving out the practicalities and manipulating dates and names in order to center the drama on a small number of personalities." In The Forward, Seth Rogovoy criticized the film as a "conventional Hollywood biopic" that offers "a superficial, simplified gloss on this remarkable story". He also criticized the historical inaccuracy and contrasted the approach with documentary films, such as Dont Look Back (1967). A Complete Unknown was named one of the top 10 films of 2024 by the American Film Institute.

=== Accolades ===
Award	Date of ceremony	Category	Nominee(s)	Result	Ref.
Hollywood Music in Media Awards	November 20, 2024	Song – Onscreen Performance (Film)	"Blowin' in the Wind" – Timothée Chalamet	Nominated	
Hollywood Music in Media Awards	November 20, 2024	Music Supervision – Film	Steven Gizicki	Nominated	
Hollywood Music in Media Awards	November 20, 2024	Music Themed Film, Biopic or Musical	James Mangold, Fred Berger, Bob Bookman, Timothée Chalamet, and Alan Gasmer	Nominated	
Gotham Awards	December 2, 2024	Visionary Tribute	Timothée Chalamet and James Mangold	Honored	
National Board of Review	December 4, 2024	Top Ten Films	A Complete Unknown	Honored	
National Board of Review	December 4, 2024	Best Supporting Actress	Elle Fanning	Won	
American Film Institute Awards	December 5, 2024	Top Ten Films	A Complete Unknown	Honored	
Boston Society of Film Critics	December 8, 2024	Best Actor	Timothée Chalamet	Won	
Boston Society of Film Critics	December 8, 2024	Best Supporting Actor	Edward Norton	Won	
Astra Film Awards	December 8, 2024	Best Actor	Timothée Chalamet	Won	
Astra Film Awards	December 8, 2024	Breakthrough Award	Monica Barbaro	Won	
Washington D.C. Area Film Critics Association	December 8, 2024	Best Actor	Timothée Chalamet	Nominated	
San Diego Film Critics Society Awards	December 9, 2024	Best Actor	Timothée Chalamet	Nominated	
San Diego Film Critics Society Awards	December 9, 2024	Best Use of Music	A Complete Unknown	Won	
Chicago Film Critics Association Awards	December 12, 2024	Best Actor	Timothée Chalamet	Nominated	
St. Louis Film Critics Association	December 15, 2024	Best Film	A Complete Unknown	Nominated	
St. Louis Film Critics Association	December 15, 2024	Best Actor	Timothée Chalamet	Nominated	
St. Louis Film Critics Association	December 15, 2024	Best Supporting Actress	Monica Barbaro	Nominated	
St. Louis Film Critics Association	December 15, 2024	Best Soundtrack	A Complete Unknown	Won	
New York Film Critics Online	December 16, 2024	Best Picture	A Complete Unknown	Nominated	
New York Film Critics Online	December 16, 2024	Best Actor	Timothée Chalamet	Nominated	
New York Film Critics Online	December 16, 2024	Best Use of Music	A Complete Unknown	Nominated	
New York Film Critics Online	December 16, 2024	Top 10 Films	A Complete Unknown	Honored	
San Francisco Bay Area Film Critics Circle	December 16, 2024	Best Actor	Timothée Chalamet	Nominated	
Dallas–Fort Worth Film Critics Association	December 18, 2024	Best Film	A Complete Unknown	5th place	
Dallas–Fort Worth Film Critics Association	December 18, 2024	Best Actor	Timothée Chalamet	3rd place	
Dallas–Fort Worth Film Critics Association	December 18, 2024	Best Supporting Actor	Edward Norton	3rd place	
Dallas–Fort Worth Film Critics Association	December 18, 2024	Best Supporting Actress	Monica Barbaro	5th place	
Kansas City Film Critics Circle	January 4, 2025	Best Actor	Timothée Chalamet	Nominated	
Golden Globe Awards	January 5, 2025	Best Motion Picture – Drama	A Complete Unknown	Nominated	
Golden Globe Awards	January 5, 2025	Best Actor in a Motion Picture – Drama	Timothée Chalamet	Nominated	
Golden Globe Awards	January 5, 2025	Best Supporting Actor – Motion Picture	Edward Norton	Nominated	
Georgia Film Critics Association	January 7, 2025	Best Actor	Timothée Chalamet	Nominated	
Houston Film Critics Society	January 14, 2025	Best Picture	A Complete Unknown	Nominated	
Houston Film Critics Society	January 14, 2025	Best Actor	Timothée Chalamet	Nominated	
Houston Film Critics Society	January 14, 2025	Best Supporting Actor	Edward Norton	Nominated	
Satellite Awards	January 26, 2025	Best Actor	Timothée Chalamet	Nominated	
Satellite Awards	January 26, 2025	Best Supporting Actor	Edward Norton	Nominated	
Satellite Awards	January 26, 2025	Best Sound (Editing and Mixing)	Ted Caplan, David Giammarco, Tod A. Maitland, Paul Massey, and Donald Sylvester	Nominated	
Online Film Critics Society	January 27, 2025	Best Actor	Timothée Chalamet	Nominated	
Online Film Critics Society	January 27, 2025	Best Supporting Actor	Edward Norton	Nominated	
Association of Motion Picture Sound Awards	January 30, 2025	Excellence in Sound for a Feature Film	A Complete Unknown	Nominated	
London Film Critics Circle	February 2, 2025	Actor of the Year	Timothée Chalamet	Nominated	
London Film Critics Circle	February 2, 2025	Technical Achievement Award	Arianne Phillips (costumes)	Nominated	
Set Decorators Society of America Awards	February 5, 2025	Best Achievement in Décor/Design of a Period Feature Film	Set Decoration by Regina Graves with Production Design by François Audouy	Won	
Critics' Choice Awards	February 7, 2025	Best Picture	A Complete Unknown	Nominated	
Critics' Choice Awards	February 7, 2025	Best Actor	Timothée Chalamet	Nominated	
Critics' Choice Awards	February 7, 2025	Best Supporting Actor	Edward Norton	Nominated	
AARP Movies for Grownups Awards	February 8, 2025	Best Picture	A Complete Unknown	Won	
AARP Movies for Grownups Awards	February 8, 2025	Best Director	James Mangold	Nominated	
AARP Movies for Grownups Awards	February 8, 2025	Best Screenwriter	James Mangold and Jay Cocks	Nominated	
AARP Movies for Grownups Awards	February 8, 2025	Best Ensemble	Timothée Chalamet, Edward Norton, Elle Fanning, Monica Barbaro, and Boyd Holbrook	Nominated	
AARP Movies for Grownups Awards	February 8, 2025	Best Time Capsule	A Complete Unknown	Won	
Directors Guild of America Awards	February 8, 2025	Outstanding Directing – Feature Film	James Mangold	Nominated	
Producers Guild of America Awards	February 8, 2025	Darryl F. Zanuck Award for Outstanding Producer of Theatrical Motion Pictures	A Complete Unknown	Nominated	
Artios Awards	February 12, 2025	Outstanding Achievement in Casting – Big Budget Feature (Drama)	Yesi Ramirez, Rori Bergman, Karlee Fomalont, and Kate Sprance	Won	
Writers Guild of America Awards	February 15, 2025	Best Adapted Screenplay	James Mangold and Jay Cocks	Nominated	
British Academy Film Awards	February 16, 2025	Best Film	Alex Bookman, Fred Berger, and James Mangold	Nominated	
British Academy Film Awards	February 16, 2025	Best Actor in a Leading Role	Timothée Chalamet	Nominated	
British Academy Film Awards	February 16, 2025	Best Actor in a Supporting Role	Edward Norton	Nominated	
British Academy Film Awards	February 16, 2025	Best Adapted Screenplay	James Mangold and Jay Cocks	Nominated	
British Academy Film Awards	February 16, 2025	Best Casting	Yesi Ramirez	Nominated	
British Academy Film Awards	February 16, 2025	Best Costume Design	Arianne Phillips	Nominated	
Vancouver Film Critics Circle	February 19, 2025	Best Actor	Timothée Chalamet	Won	
Vancouver Film Critics Circle	February 19, 2025	Best Supporting Actor	Edward Norton	Nominated	
Vancouver Film Critics Circle	February 19, 2025	Best Supporting Actress	Monica Barbaro	Nominated	
Cinema Audio Society Awards	February 22, 2025	Outstanding Achievement in Sound Mixing for a Motion Picture – Live Action	Tod A. Maitland, Paul Massey, David Giammarco, Nick Baxter, David Betancourt, and Kevin Schultz	Won	
USC Scripter Awards	February 22, 2025	Best Adapted Screenplay – Film	James Mangold and Jay Cocks	Nominated	
American Society of Cinematographers Awards	February 23, 2025	Outstanding Achievement in Cinematography in Theatrical Releases	Phedon Papamichael	Nominated	
Golden Reel Awards	February 23, 2025	Outstanding Achievement in Sound Editing – Feature Dialogue / ADR	Donald Sylvester, Russell Farmarco, Anna MacKenzie, Robert Troy	Nominated	
Golden Reel Awards	February 23, 2025	Outstanding Achievement in Music Editing – Feature Motion Picture	Ted Caplan, Maggie Talibart	Nominated	
Guild of Music Supervisors Awards	February 23, 2025	Best Music Supervision in Mid-Level Budget Films	Steven Gizicki	Won	
Screen Actors Guild Awards	February 23, 2025	Outstanding Performance by a Cast in a Motion Picture	Monica Barbaro, Norbert Leo Butz, Timothée Chalamet, Elle Fanning, Dan Fogler, Will Harrison, Eriko Hatsune, Boyd Holbrook, Scoot McNairy, Big Bill Morganfield, Edward Norton	Nominated	
Screen Actors Guild Awards	February 23, 2025	Outstanding Performance by a Male Actor in a Leading Role	Timothée Chalamet	Won	
Screen Actors Guild Awards	February 23, 2025	Outstanding Performance by a Male Actor in a Supporting Role	Edward Norton	Nominated	
Screen Actors Guild Awards	February 23, 2025	Outstanding Performance by a Female Actor in a Supporting Role	Monica Barbaro	Nominated	
Art Directors Guild Awards	February 15, 2025	Excellence in Production Design for a Period Film	François Audouy	Nominated	
Academy Awards	March 2, 2025	Best Picture	Fred Berger, James Mangold and Alex Heineman, producers	Nominated	
Academy Awards	March 2, 2025	Best Director	James Mangold	Nominated	
Academy Awards	March 2, 2025	Best Actor	Timothée Chalamet	Nominated	
Academy Awards	March 2, 2025	Best Supporting Actor	Edward Norton	Nominated	
Academy Awards	March 2, 2025	Best Supporting Actress	Monica Barbaro	Nominated	
Academy Awards	March 2, 2025	Best Adapted Screenplay	James Mangold and Jay Cocks	Nominated	
Academy Awards	March 2, 2025	Best Sound	Tod A. Maitland, Donald Sylvester, Ted Caplan, Paul Massey and David Giammarco	Nominated	
Academy Awards	March 2, 2025	Best Costume Design	Arianne Phillips	Nominated	
Location Managers Guild Awards	August 23, 2025	Outstanding Locations in a Period Film	Anthony Pisani	Won	
Location Managers Guild Awards	August 23, 2025	Outstanding Film Commission	New Jersey Motion Picture & Television Commission	Won	
Camerimage	November 22, 2025	Golden Frog	Phedon Papamichael	Nominated	
Robert Awards	January 31, 2026	Best English Language Film	James Mangold	Nominated	

== See also ==
- Electric Dylan controversy
- No Direction Home, a 2005 documentary film about Bob Dylan, his emergence in the Greenwich Village folk scene, and his transition to electric music, directed by Martin Scorsese.
- I'm Not There, a 2007 experimental biopic inspired by the life of Bob Dylan, directed by Todd Haynes.
- Inside Llewyn Davis, a 2013 Coen brothers film inspired by Dave Van Ronk's memoir, The Mayor of MacDougal Street. The film follows a fictional week in the life of a struggling New York City folk singer in 1961, leading up to Dylan's historic debut at The Gaslight Cafe.
