= Ballad in Plain D =

Song by Bob Dylan

from the album Another Side of Bob Dylan
- Released: August 1964
- Recorded: June 9, 1964
- Label: Columbia
- Songwriter: Bob Dylan
- Producer: Tom Wilson

"Ballad in Plain D" is the tenth track of Bob Dylan's fourth album, Another Side of Bob Dylan, and—at 8 minutes, 18 seconds—the longest song on the album. The song recounts the circumstances surrounding the disintegration of Dylan's relationship with Suze Rotolo.

== Background ==
In the song Dylan details the conflicts between himself and Rotolo's mother, Mary Rotolo, and her sister Carla Rotolo. Critic Andy Gill writes that, in this song, Dylan clumsily idealizes Suze Rotolo, while "viciously characterizing Carla as a pretentious, social-climbing parasite".

The song relates how tension between Dylan and Suze Rotolo came to a head in the last week of March 1964 with a violent argument, in which Dylan and sister Carla shouted abuse at each other. "Beneath a bare lightbulb the plaster did pound/ Her sister and I in a screaming battleground/ And she in between, the victim of sound/ Soon shattered as a child to the shadows."

Andy Gill writes that "Ballad in Plain D" is one of Dylan's "least satisfying" songs because it fails to amount to anything more than a "self-pitying, one-sided account of the final traumatic night of Dylan's long-standing romance with Suze Rotolo". Gill contrasts Dylan's inability to handle such personal material successfully with his ability to "wax lyrical about more abstract philosophical concerns such as the state of society and the nature of freedom".

Clinton Heylin says that Dylan wrote a rough outline of "Ballad in Plain D" soon after the events. In May 1964, he stayed in the Greek village of Vernilya (possibly Vouliagmeni), working on songs for his next album; there he drew out the material to the lengthy ballad he recorded in June 1964. Heylin writes "It took thirteen cathartic verses to get all this out of his system, without Dylan ever transcending his material. 'Plain D' remains an exercise in painful autobiography."

In an interview with Victoria Balfour, Suze Rotolo sounded a forgiving note about the song: "People have asked how I felt about those songs that were bitter, like 'Ballad in Plain D', since I inspired some of those too, yet I never felt hurt by them. I understood what he was doing. It was the end of something and we both were hurt and bitter. His art was his outlet, his exorcism. It was healthy. That was the way he wrote out his life; the loving songs, the cynical songs, the political songs, they are all part of the way he saw his world and lived his life, period."

Dylan, when asked in 1985 if he had any regrets about "Ballad In Plain D", replied: "Oh yeah, that one! I look back and say 'I must have been a real schmuck to write that.' I look back at that particular one and say, of all the songs I've written, maybe I could have left that alone."

The opening words of "Ballad in Plain D"—"I once loved a girl"—also provided the melody of the song. Heylin states that one of the most familiar song types in the English folk tradition is "Once I Had A Sweetheart" (also known as "The Forsaken Lover"), and that this song gave Dylan his tune. It also resembles the tune of the folk song "I Once Loved A Lass" and the penultimate verse of that song is clearly the model for Dylan's last verse.
