= Ruth Hubbard =

Austrian-American biochemist (1924–2016)

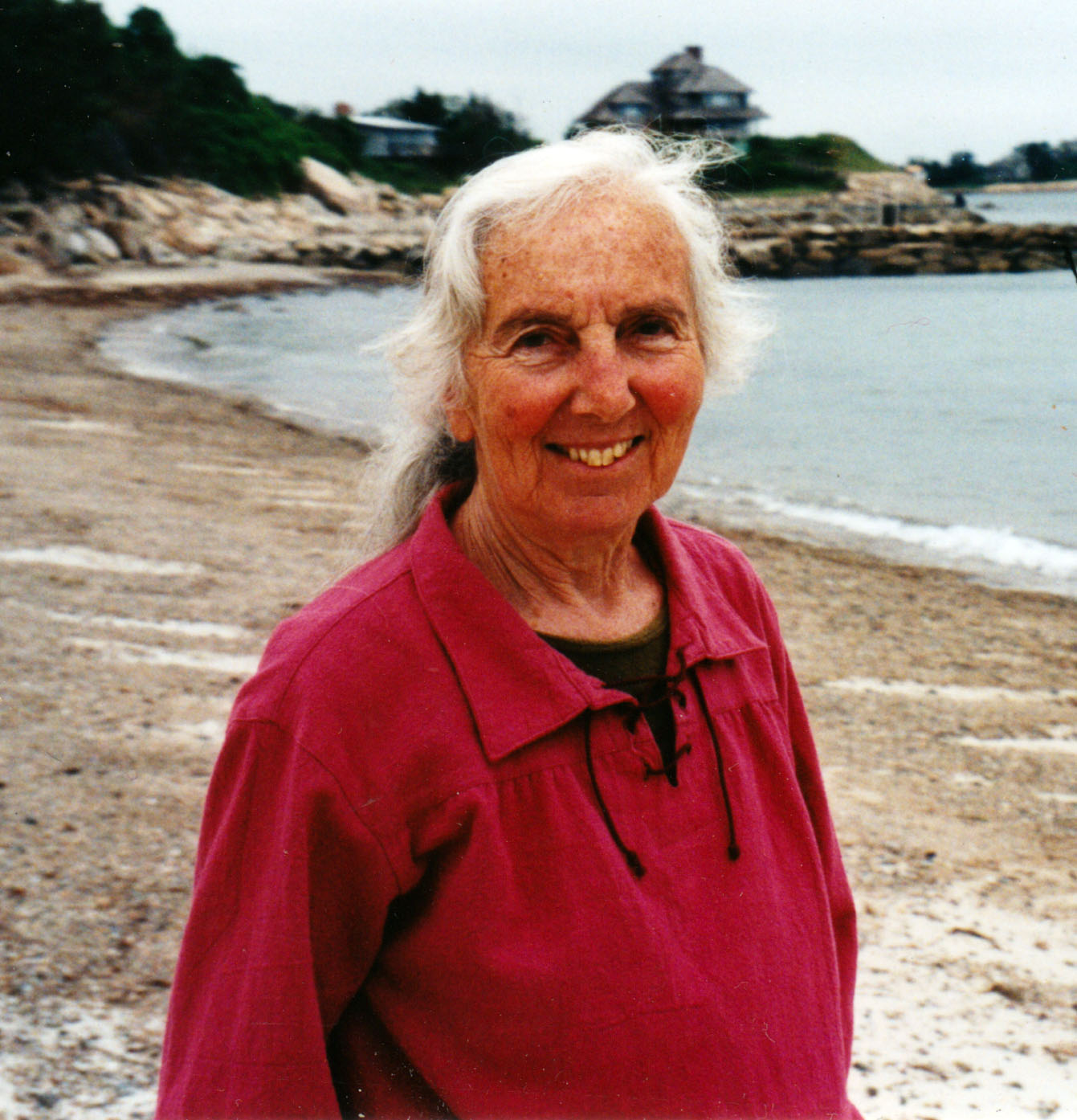
- Hubbard in Woods Hole, Massachusetts
- Born: Ruth Hoffmann; March 3, 1924; Vienna, Austria
- Died: September 1, 2016 (aged 92); Cambridge, Massachusetts, U.S.
- Education: Radcliffe College
- Spouses: Frank Hubbard (m. 1942–1951) George Wald (m. 1958–1997)
- Children: Elijah Wald; Deborah Hannah Wald
- Awards: Paul Karrer Gold Medal
- Scientific career
- Fields: Biology
- Workplaces: Harvard University

Ruth Hubbard (March 3, 1924 – September 1, 2016) was a professor of biology at Harvard University, where she was the first woman to hold a tenured professorship position in biology.

During her active research career from the 1940s to the 1960s, she made important contributions to the understanding of the biochemistry and photochemistry of vision in vertebrates and invertebrates. In 1967, Hubbard and George Wald shared the Paul Karrer Gold Medal for their work in this area.

In the late 1960s, her interests shifted from science to societal issues and activism.

== Early life and education ==
In 1924, Hubbard was born Ruth Hoffmann in Vienna, Austria. Her parents, Richard Hoffmann and Helene Ehrlich Hoffmann, were both physicians and leftist intellectuals. Her mother was also a concert-quality pianist, and as a child, Ruth showed promise on the piano as well. When Nazi Germany annexed Austria in 1938, the Hoffmanns immigrated to the United States to escape. The family settled first in Brookline, Massachusetts, where Ruth graduated Brookline High School, and then in Cambridge.

Ruth decided to enroll at Radcliffe College with the intent to pursue a pre-medicine degree, which she attributes to the fact that everyone around her was a doctor. At that time, Radcliffe was a sister institution to Harvard since women were not yet allowed to enroll at the university. Ruth sensed the disdain that the distinguished Harvard professors had for the system that required them to travel to the Radcliffe campus to teach the small female classes after teaching the same lecture to their male students at Harvard. However, by 1946 most classes were coeducational and taught by Harvard professors. For a brief period, Ruth was interested in pursuing a degree in Philosophy and Physics, and even though she was never explicitly told not to go into Physics, she got the feeling that she was not welcome. She attributes this feeling of unease to the time that she took a coeducational Physics course in which she was only one of two women in the class of 350 students. Ruth finally settled on biochemical sciences, and in 1944 graduated from Radcliffe College with a B.A. in biochemical sciences.

Out of a desire to help the Allied War effort in World War II, Ruth joined the laboratory of George Wald, where they conducted research on infrared vision. She briefly relocated to Chattanooga where her first husband Frank Hubbard was stationed. When the war ended, they returned to Cambridge. Ruth returned to Radcliffe in 1946 in pursuit of her doctorate in biology. She was awarded a predoctoral fellowship by the U.S. Public Health Service in 1948, allowing her to study at the University College Hospital Medical School in London. Ruth received her PhD in biology in 1950.

== Scientific career ==
After receiving her PhD from Harvard, Ruth became a research fellow. She worked under George Wald, investigating the biochemistry of retinal and retinol. According to an interview given by Ruth, together they built on the work that Wald had researched during a fellowship following his own doctorate degree. He had confirmed the long-held belief that vitamin A was related to vision. Not only did he find that light absorption liberated vitamin A, he also found an intermediate of the visual pigment rhodopsin and vitamin A. This intermediate was the base of Ruth’s early work, where she attempted to determine the chemistry of the rhodopsin cycle. In 1952, Ruth received a Guggenheim Fellowship at the Carlsberg Laboratory in Copenhagen, Denmark. Wald shared the Nobel Prize in Physiology or Medicine in 1967 for his discoveries about how the eye works. In the same year, the pair was awarded the Paul Karrer Gold Medal specifically for their work with rhodopsin.

Hubbard made many important contributions to the visual sciences but her single most important contribution was that visual excitation is initiated by a chemical rearrangement of the visual pigment (rhodopsin) which is called a cis-trans isomerization. She showed that this is the only direct action of light on the visual system. She also identified the specific intermediate in the visual cycle (called metarhodopsin2) that leads to downstream effects, that culminate in a light-activated neural signaling to the brain Hubbard also described the bleaching and resynthesis of the rhodopsin molecule each time a photon is absorbed. She also discovered retinene isomerase (now called RPE65) that converts all-trans retinal (the post-illumination form) back into 11-cis retinal. She also studied the visual pigments in several new species. Her early work focused on the basic properties of rhodopsin, which is a combination of the chromophore (retinal) and a protein called opsin, which is reutilized in the resynthesis of rhodopsin. Hubbard published at least 31 scientific papers devoted to vision.

== Social commentary and political activity ==
In the late 1960s and early 1970s, Hubbard became interested in social and political dimensions of biological issues. In her book The Politics of Women's Biology, she wrote that she had been a "devout scientist" from 1947 until the late 1960s, but the Vietnam War and the women's liberation movement led her to change her priorities.

Hubbard describes an instance where she was working with squid as one of the pivotal moments where her interests shifted from scientific research to social relevance. Despite working with squid, cattle, and frogs for years when researching the complexities of vision, at that instant it suddenly began to bother her. She said, “I began to have the feeling that nothing I could find out was worth killing another squid.”

Around the same time in the late 1960s, as a member of the American Association for the Advancement of Science, Ruth was asked to give a talk about being a female in the sciences. While conducting interviews of her fellow female scientists, Hubbard discovered that they were all in similar situations. Each of the women were accomplished in their fields, yet none of them had real jobs. They all had what Ruth called “nonjobs.” They had titles such as lecturer or associate which meant they had little to no job security, while their male-counterparts were either on the path to professorships or had already received tenure. This led Ruth and others to join a group that petitioned Harvard to reevaluate the job statuses of its female faculty. Ruth Hubbard was the first woman to be offered a tenured Harvard professorship in the Biology Department in 1973.

After being promoted in 1973 from what she called the "typical women's ghetto" of "research associate and lecturer" positions to a tenured faculty position at Harvard, she felt increased freedom to pursue new interests.

One such interest manifested itself in the new seminar course she taught at Harvard titled “Biology 109 - Biology and Women’s Issues.” The class looked at the role of women in science and how the absence of women in scientific fields had affected the scientific questions that were asked.

In the late 1980s and 1990s, Ruth gave several interviews challenging the power structure in STEM fields. What constitutes science, she told the Globe in 1990, usually is decided by “a self-perpetuating, self-reflexive group: by the chosen for the chosen,” and those “chosen” historically were upper-class white men. “Women and nonwhite, working-class and poor men have largely been outside the process of science-making,” Dr. Hubbard told The New York Times in 1981. “Though we have been described by scientists, by and large we have not been the describers and definers of scientific reality. We have not formulated the questions scientists ask, nor have we answered them. This undoubtedly has affected the content of science, but it has also affected the social context and the ambience in which science is done.”

She became known as a strong critic of sociobiology. Geneticist Richard Lewontin has said, "No one has been a more influential critic of the biological theory of women's inequality than Ruth Hubbard." In a 2006 essay entitled "Race and Genes," she wrote:

It is beyond comprehension, in this century which has witnessed holocausts of ethnic, racial, and religious extermination in many parts of our planet, perpetrated by peoples of widely different cultural and political affiliations and beliefs, that educated persons—scholars and popularizers alike—can come forward to argue, as though in complete innocence and ignorance of our recent history, that nothing could be more interesting and worthwhile than to sort out the "racial" or "ethnic" components of our thoroughly mongrelized species so as to ascertain the root identity of each and everyone of us. And where to look for that identity if not in our genes?

Ruth also became a critic of recombinant DNA research, in a time when the field was booming. She was concerned that people were attempting to assign every trait, disease, and behavior a genetic cause, leading to an oversimplification of science which does not consider the complexities of nature and outside factors. She termed this craze “genomania.” She was also worried about the safeguards surrounding such research. In a letter published by the American Association for the Advancement of Science, Hubbard stated that if an epidemic caused by a recombinant organism were to break out, it would be almost impossible to distinguish it from the natural E. coli strains that humans are already exposed to.

=== Commentary on gender and science ===
In her essay "Science and Science Criticism," published in 2001 as a chapter of The Gender and Science Reader, Hubbard iterates that she is a scientist and states that "[n]ature is part of history and culture", but not vice versa. She goes on to say that scientists are largely unable to grasp the concept of nature being part of life--- noting how she needed several years to understand the statement. Going into her scientific history, the narrator mentions how she originally never questioned how her efforts fit into society. Narrowing her focus, she exposits that the Vietnam-era women's rights and women's liberation movements helped teach her of the roles of science in society.

She continues forth with the various means of debate for both sides. One notable instance from men is when they revive various old and unfounded biological theories on women to justify the typical subservient positions of the female gender. Hubbard even refers to the means of debate as "breathing new life" into old theories and assumptions. She further exposits the issues revolving around gender equality that were mainly brought to her attention by how she and her colleagues suddenly started getting promoted from their "ghetto" lab positions right into proper titles. She promptly stresses that "[she believes] the subject of women's biology is profoundly political", explaining away the book's title as she does so. Proceeding onward her desire to go beyond "defining [women as a whole] as victims of male power and dominance," and pushes for women everywhere to show independence and individuality while learning to accept and embrace the biology that's continuously used by men to undermine them. To follow up, she goes on to talk about women's health activists re-educating women on the functions of their body and goes on to encourage women to use the re-education to attain great power by eliminating the footholds of male misinformation and misrepresentation of their bodies.

The essay asserts that women scientists must ultimately and paradoxically turn away from the sciences to make their stand against male supremacy as opposed to the many female and feminist poets, novelists, and artists that can illustrate their points clearly and easily. She notes that politics seems to vanish within the sciences, exemplifying this point by noting social classes aren't a specific category listed under US health studies. The point she makes is that social and political realities can be blended or integrated subtly into all mediums. The subtlety of the integration ultimately creates great difficulty in discerning fact from prejudice. In addition, artists, novelists, and poets can compose their works without being victim to review under the funding agencies that makes the use of scientific fact tedious and less effective. The author leads in to surmise that the issues around women's rights must be raised and brought into public focus. After bringing up how science integrates itself into culture, she exemplifies the point by noting the prominence of biological terms in historical terminology and alluringly points out a biologist's tendency to place humanity above all other animals--- not unlike how men view women and their desire for equality. She raises the question of whether or not women can improve the sciences but makes an attempt to bring into attention her belief that women can make an impact. Hubbard closes by saying that scientists never want their work to be forgotten and lost, and that she sides with feminism for political insight and analytic testing on the scientific assumptions about women.

== Personal life ==
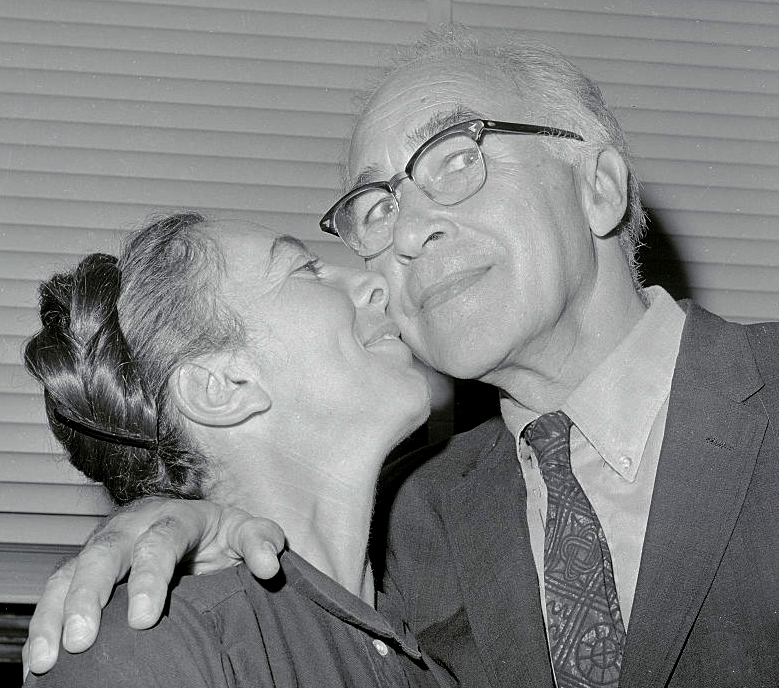
Hubbard and Wald in 1967

Ruth Hubbard was married to WWII GI and fellow Harvard graduate Frank Hubbard in 1942. Ruth fondly remembered the months that the pair spent traveling via motorcycle across Europe as Frank researched harpsichords. The couple divorced in 1951.

Ruth had met her second husband, George Wald, while they were both at Harvard. Wald was a Professor of Biology and Ruth’s boss in the research lab. However, the two began and kept their love affair a secret for more than a decade since they were married to other people at the time. After their respective divorces to previous partners, Ruth and George married in 1958. The couple had two children: a son, musician and music historian Elijah Wald, and a daughter, attorney Deborah Wald. Hubbard would go on to publish a book, Exploding the Gene Myth, with her son Elijah.

Both Ruth and her brother Alexander followed in the footsteps of their activist parents. Alexander Hoffman was a well-known lawyer and activist. Some of his high-profile clients included Cesar Chavez, Lenny Bruce, and multiple members of the Black Panther Party. Like her brother, Ruth Hubbard was an outspoken activist. However, she was not only known for her commentary on science in society but was also as an antiwar and antinuclear war activist, for which she was once arrested on charges of civil disobedience.

Like her second husband, Ruth remained scientifically active until about 1975, and she made an excellent scientific presentation of George Wald's work at a symposium in his honor. George Wald was 17 years older than Hubbard and he died in 1997.

== Partial bibliography ==
=== Selected articles ===
- Ruth Hubbard and George Wald (1952). "Cis-trans Isomers of Vitamin A and Retinene in the Rhodopsin System". The Journal of General Physiology. 36 (2): 269–315. doi:10.1085/jgp.36.2.269. PMC 2147363. PMID 13011282.
- Ruth Hubbard, Robert I. Gregerman, and George Wald (1953). "Geometrical Isomers of Retinene". The Journal of General Physiology. 36 (3): 415–429. doi:10.1085/jgp.36.3.415. PMC 2147351. PMID 13022935.
- Ruth Hubbard and Robert C. C. St. George (1958). "The Rhodopsin System of the Squid". The Journal of General Physiology. 41 (3): 501–528. doi:10.1085/jgp.41.3.501. PMC 2194838. PMID 13491819.
- Ruth Hubbard and Allen Kropf (1958). "The Action of Light on Rhodopsin". Proceedings of the National Academy of Sciences of the United States of America. 44 (2): 130–139. Bibcode:1958PNAS...44..130H. doi:10.1073/pnas.44.2.130. PMC 335377. PMID 16590155.
- Ruth Hubbard, Deric Bownds, and Tôru Yoshizawa (1965). "The Chemistry of Visual Photoreception". Cold Spring Harbor Symposia on Quantitative Biology. 30: 301–315. doi:10.1101/sqb.1965.030.01.032. PMID 5219484.
- Ruth Hubbard (1988). "Science, Facts and Feminism". Hypatia. 3 (1): 5–17. doi:10.1111/j.1527-2001.1988.tb00053.x. S2CID 143910426.
- R. Hubbard and R.C. Lewontin (1996). "Pitfalls of Genetic Testing". New England Journal of Medicine. 334 (18): 1192–1194. doi:10.1056/nejm199605023341812. PMID 8602190.
- Ruth Hubbard (2006), Race & Genes, in Is Race Real?, a web forum sponsored by the Social Science Research Council, June 7, 2006

=== Books ===
- Ruth Hubbard (1990), The Politics of Women's Biology, Rutgers University Press. ISBN 0-8135-1490-8, ISBN 978-0-8135-1490-1
- Ruth Hubbard and Elijah Wald (1993), Exploding the Gene Myth: How Genetic Information Is Produced and Manipulated by Scientists, Physicians, Employers, Insurance Companies, Educators, and Law Enforcers, Beacon Press. ISBN 0-8070-0431-6, ISBN 978-0-8070-0431-9
- Ruth Hubbard (1995), Profitable Promises: Essays on Women, Science & Health, Common Courage Press. ISBN 1-56751-041-8, ISBN 978-1-56751-041-6
