= Dylan Goes Electric! =

2015 book by Elijah Wald

- Author: Elijah Wald
- Language: English
- Publisher: Dey Street/HarperCollins
- Publication date: July 25, 2015
- Publication place: United States
- Media type: Print
- Pages: 368
- ISBN: 978-0-06-236668-9
- OCLC: 913522388

Dylan Goes Electric! Newport, Seeger, Dylan, and the Night That Split the Sixties is a 2015 book by Elijah Wald and published by Dey Street Books.

The book describes the Electric Dylan controversy, arising from a conflict between Bob Dylan and Pete Seeger during the Newport Folk Festival. According to Wald, 17,000 people witnessed the titular event, and recollections of the event vary widely.

John Harris of The Guardian wrote that the "contrast between Dylan and Seeger" is the "spine" of the book, and that it "both explains the huge array of subplots that fed into the Newport moment and undermines any idea that the story is clear-cut." Timothy Farrington of The Wall Street Journal wrote that the book is about "the clash between cultural authenticity and commercial success."

The book was part of the inspiration of the 2024 film A Complete Unknown; the film's opening credits state that the film is "based on" the book.

== Summary ==
The book’s title is derived from Bob Dylan’s performance at the 1965 Newport Folk Festival. In addition to recounting the "mythology" of this event, the book also discusses Dylan’s early career, the early days of the Newport Folk Festival and the folk music scene, Pete Seeger and his interactions with Dylan, and other historical events of the early 1960s.

After introducing the figure of Pete Seeger and recounting the early days of his career, the book pivots to Dylan’s early life in Minnesota, his early performances, and his arrival at the New York City folk scene. Commentary on the 1960s folk revival is interpolated into Dylan’s backstory, with Wald detailing the rift between fans of “authentic” folk music and those of contemporary folk groups such as The Kingston Trio. During the early 1960s, Dylan experimented with different performance personae as he performed at different venues in New York.

The book also covers the origins and early years of the Newport Folk Festival, the formation of the folk festival’s foundation board, and the involvement of Alan Lomax and Albert Grossman. Detailed reports on the 1963, 1964, and 1965 festivals include performances by Joan Baez, Johnny Cash, The Chambers Brothers, Donovan, Mimi Fariña & Richard Fariña, and Seeger. Dylan first appeared at the festival in 1963 and returned for the following two festivals. According to Wald, the Newport ethos clashed with Dylan’s style as he shifted towards rock music with a new band. The Butterfield Band was actually the first act to “go electric” at Newport, but Dylan drew more attention due to the drastic change in his performance persona: he “was showing exactly who he was and what he was about.”

A significant portion of the commentary is devoted to socio-cultural trends during the 1960s. Changes in the popular music scene during this decade included the rise of British rock and the growing prominence of singer-songwriters. Wald discusses the convergence between folk and rock styles and the changing folk scene alongside remarks about the Civil rights movement and the new drug culture. By the mid-1960s, other artists were covering Dylan’s music and emulating his songwriting. Dylan also had a significant impact on The Rolling Stones and The Beatles. The period after the 1965 Newport Folk Festival was marked by significant socio-cultural changes as the “optimism of the early 1960s was slipping away.”

Throughout the book, Wald incorporates reviews of and reactions to Seeger’s and Dylan’s performances and recordings, including first-hand accounts and "almost second by second" details that "[examine] all sides" of Dylan’s performance at the 1965 Newport Folk Festival. According to David Kirby, the book shows that the Electric Dylan controversy is about the complexity of narratives and "not so much about music."

The book concludes with remarks on the legacies of Dylan, Seeger, and the Newport Folk Festival.

== Background ==
Wald based the book on a variety of first-hand accounts of the Electric Dylan controversy, including those gathered through film and recorded tapes. Dorian Lynskey of The Spectator Australia wrote that the number of sources used was in the "dozens". One source included an interview with a person who overhead a conversation between Pete Seeger and Charles Seeger immediately following the event.

== Reception ==
Dylan Goes Electric! received positive reviews in The Guardian, The New York Times,, The Observer, The Wall Street Journal, and The Washington Post. Mark Levine of Booklist gave it a starred review, writing that "the book makes a major contribution to modern musical history." Kirkus Reviews wrote that the book is "an enjoyable slice of 20th-century music journalism". Janet Maslin of The New York Times wrote that, while "oversimplifications" of Seeger and Dylan are a feature of the book, "Wald does a fascinating job" showing how Seeger navigated the commercial side of Newport and the folk revival while supporting his family and upholding his values. Dorian Lynskey of The Spectator Australia wrote that the book does not "take sides" about the Electric Dylan controversy and that is its "real contribution" to the topic.

== See also ==
- Bob Dylan bibliography
