= Down the Highway: The Life of Bob Dylan =

2001 book by Howard Sounes

- First edition cover
- Author: Howard Sounes
- Language: English
- Subject: Bob Dylan
- Genre: Biography
- Publisher: Grove Press
- Publication date: May 24, 2001
- Media type: Print (hardback & paperback)
- ISBN: 0-8021-1686-8

Down the Highway: The Life of Bob Dylan is a 2001 biography of American singer-songwriter Bob Dylan by British writer Howard Sounes. It is notable for making public the knowledge of Dylan's marriage to Carolyn Dennis, and that the two had a daughter. The book was published by Grove Press on May 24, 2001, to coincide with Dylan's 60th birthday.

== Reception ==
Variety's Sherri Linden wrote of the book:

Sounes's spare, flat prose is at first a disappointment, given the poetic force of its subject. But in a relatively brief number of pages, as Bob tomes go, the author sketches a straight-ahead portrait, his interviews often reaping indelible anecdotes or quotes. The fast-paced book has a fine, never heavy-handed interest in details, interweaving stories of Dylan's domestic life with a chronicle of his prodigious output of 40-plus recordings, including his groundbreaking sessions in Nashville and seminal work with the Band.

Linden also praised in particular Sounes's coverage of Dylan's Rolling Thunder Revue tour. Neil Spencer, reviewing the book for The Observer, stated: "Engagingly written and scrupulously researched, it proves a sympathetic but never fawning account which moves evenly through Dylan's career; too evenly, since the comings and goings of years on the road are never going to yield the cultural payback of his mercurial Sixties." Perry Meisel of The New York Times commended Sounes's coverage of Dylan's recording sessions and tour rehearsals, but critiqued the book for "succumbing to" a "myth[ic]" view of Dylan's later career, and concluded: "While Sounes has added a wealth of new information to Dylan studies, he has a tin ear when it comes to orchestrating what he has found." Salon's Allen Barra wrote that the book "has the definite virtue of being the last one you'll ever need to read about Dylan", though he criticized Sounes for perceivedly writing as "a fan, not a critic," and disagreed with Sounes's presentation of the state of rock and roll music in the early 1960s.

In his 2021 book The Double Life of Bob Dylan: Vol. 1, 1941–1966: A Restless, Hungry Feeling, fellow Dylan biographer Clinton Heylin refers to Sounes as "a former tabloid reporter aka professional dirtdigger", and Down the Highway as a "depressingly well-trundled, semi-literate stroll". In response, Sounes called Heylin "a clunky, self-indulgent writer", and stated: "He seems to be very upset that, in 2001, I got a lot of publicity because I revealed that Dylan had a secret second marriage, to a woman called Carolyn Dennis, which made headlines all over the world and helped make the book a bestseller."

== See also ==
- Bob Dylan bibliography
