= Paul Karrer =

Swiss organic chemist (1889–1971)

Professor Paul Karrer FRS FRSE FCS
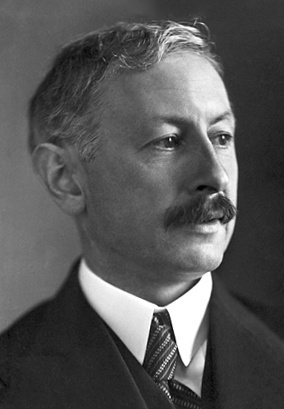
- Born: 21 April 1889; Moscow, Russia
- Died: 18 June 1971 (aged 82); Zürich, Switzerland
- Education: Old Cantonal School Aarau (Matura); University of Zurich (PhD)
- Known for: discovery of Vitamin A
- Awards: Marcel Benoist Prize (1922); Nobel Prize for Chemistry (1937)
- Scientific career
- Fields: Chemistry
- Workplaces: University of Zurich

Paul Karrer (21 April 1889 – 18 June 1971) was a Swiss organic chemist best known for his research on vitamins. He and British chemist Norman Haworth won the Nobel Prize for Chemistry in 1937.

== Biography ==
=== Early years ===
Karrer was born in Moscow, Russia to Paul Karrer and Julie Lerch, both Swiss nationals. In 1892 Karrer's family returned to Switzerland where he was educated at Wildegg and at the Old Cantonal School Aarau where he matriculated in 1908. He studied chemistry at the University of Zurich under Alfred Werner and after gaining his PhD in 1911, he spent a further year as an assistant in the Chemical Institute. He then took a post as a chemist with Paul Ehrlich at the Georg Speyer Haus, Frankfurt-am-Main. In 1919 he became Professor of Chemistry and Director of the Chemical Institute.

=== Research ===
Karrer's early research concerned complex metal compounds but his most important work has concerned plant pigments, particularly the yellow carotenoids. He elucidated their chemical structure and showed that some of these substances are transformed in the body into vitamin A. His work led to the establishment of the correct constitutional formula for β-carotene, the chief precursor of vitamin A; the first time that the structure of a vitamin or provitamin had been established. George Wald worked briefly in Karrer's lab while studying the role of vitamin A in the retina. Later, Karrer confirmed the structure of ascorbic acid (vitamin C) and extended his researches into the vitamin B_{2} and E. His important contributions to the chemistry of the flavins led to the identification of lactoflavin as part of the complex originally thought to be vitamin B_{2}.

Karrer published many papers and received many honours and awards, including the Nobel Prize in 1937. His textbook Lehrbuch der Organischen Chemie (Textbook of Organic Chemistry) was published in 1927, went through thirteen editions, and was published in seven languages.

=== Personal life ===
Karrer married Helena Froelich in 1914 and had three sons, one of whom died in infancy. He died on 18 June 1971, at the age of 82 in Zürich. His wife died in 1972.

== Legacy ==
The prestigious Paul Karrer Gold Medal and lecture were established in his honour in 1959 by a group of leading companies such as CIBA AG, J.R. Geigy, F. Hoffmann-La Roche & Co. AG, Sandoz AG, Société des Produits Nestlé AG and Dr. A. Wander AG. It is awarded annually or biannually to an outstanding chemist who delivers a lecture at the University of Zurich.

The Paul Karrer Lecture Foundation is based at the Chemistry Institute of the University of Zurich at Rämistrasse 71, in Zürich.
