= Exploding the Gene Myth =

1993 book about human genetics

- Author: Ruth Hubbard, Elijah Wald
- Language: English
- Subject: Human genetics
- Genre: Non-fiction
- Publisher: Beacon Press
- Publication date: 1993
- Pages: 206
- ISBN: 0807004197
- OCLC: 36383140

Exploding the Gene Myth: How Genetic Information is Produced and Manipulated by Scientists, Physicians, Employers, Insurance Companies, Educators, and Law Enforcers is a 1993 book by biologist Ruth Hubbard and her son Elijah Wald, published by Beacon Press. The book is critical of many potential and actual uses of human genetic information, such as attempts to develop personalized medical treatments for diseases based on an individual's genome. A second edition was published in 1999, adding discussions of cloning and pharming, among other subjects.

== Reviews ==
In his review of the book's first edition, Alan H. Goodman praised it as a "worthwhile read" and "an antidote to the rise of geneticization", while also admitting that he did not consider it to be "categorically the best book it could have been". In another mixed review, William J. McIntyre criticized the authors' biased presentation of the role played by DNA in human traits, while also describing the book as "good and valuable reading". Behavior geneticist David Rowe praised the book's discussion of socially controversial aspects of human genetics, but claimed that it failed to provide "either an evenhanded or accurate treatment of molecular and behavioral genetics."
