= Charles Bukowski: Locked in the Arms of a Crazy Life =

1998 book by Howard Sounes

- Author: Howard Sounes
- Subject: Charles Bukowski
- Genre: Biography
- Publisher: Grove Press
- Publication date: 1998
- ISBN: 978-1-84195-897-2

Locked in the Arms of a Crazy Life, a book by Howard Sounes, published in 1998 by Grove Press, is a biography of American writer Charles Bukowski.
