= Elijah Wald =

American guitarist and music historian (born 1959)

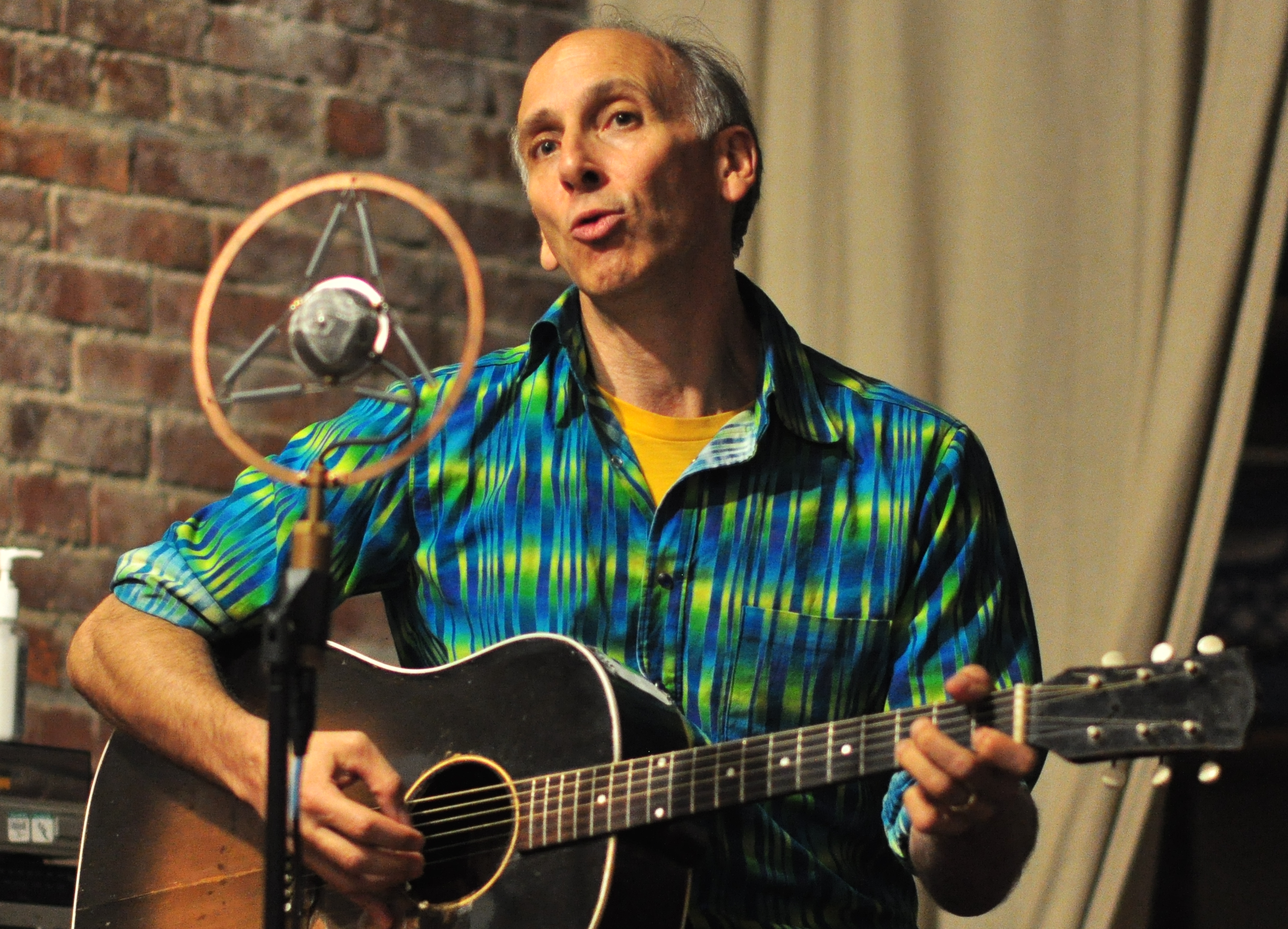
- Wald in 2016

Background information
- Born: 1959 (age 66–67); Cambridge, Massachusetts, US
- Genres: Blues, folk
- Occupations: Musician, author
- Instrument: Guitar
- Website: elijahwald.com

Elijah Wald (born 1959) is an American folk blues guitarist, music journalist, and a blues, pop, and cultural music historian. He is a 2002 Grammy Award winner for his liner notes to The Arhoolie Records 40th Anniversary Box: The Journey of Chris Strachwitz. Wald's 2015 book Dylan Goes Electric! Newport, Seeger, Dylan, and the Night That Split the Sixties served as the basis for the film A Complete Unknown.

== Life ==
Wald, who is of Jewish heritage, was born in 1959 in Cambridge, Massachusetts. His parents were George Wald (co-recipient of the 1967 Nobel Prize in Physiology or Medicine) and Ruth Hubbard, a biologist, with whom Elijah co-authored Exploding the Gene Myth.

At age 18, Wald departed for Europe to try to make a living as a folk-blues guitarist. For approximately the next 12 years, he traveled the world. He fronted a blues band in Seville, Spain, a swing trio in Antwerp, Belgium, and a rock band in Colombo, Sri Lanka, and studied with Congolese guitarist Jean-Bosco Mwenda. Returning to the United States, he played in "low dives and honky-tonks", and recorded two albums: the LP Songster, Fingerpicker, Shirtmaker on his and Bill Morrissey's short-lived label Reckless Records and the CD Street Corner Cowboys (Black Rose Records, 2000). He also arranged and played guitar on one track of Dave Van Ronk's album of Bertolt Brecht songs, and performed as a sideman with Eric Von Schmidt and for several years with the legendary string band leader Howard Armstrong.

For many years he wrote for the Boston Globe on "roots music" and "world music"; he also wrote on American and international music for various magazines. In 2000, he was one of many freelancers who left the Globe in a dispute over reprint rights.

By the time he and the Globe parted ways, he was already becoming an increasingly established writer. He had been a major collaborator in the Smithsonian Institution's multimedia project River of Song, a survey of contemporary music along the Mississippi River, and had just finished Josh White: Society Blues, a biography of the folk-blues singer Josh White.

Since 2000, he has written numerous books; several of them had CDs as companion pieces. His subject matter has included Mexican corridos and narcocorridos, hitchhiking, the blues musician Robert Johnson and, in How the Beatles Destroyed Rock 'n' Roll, American popular music for roughly the first three-quarters of the 20th century. He co-authored Dave Van Ronk's posthumously published memoir, The Mayor of MacDougal Street (the main inspiration for the Coen Brothers movie Inside Llewyn Davis), wrote the Grammy-winning liner notes for The Arhoolie Records 40th Anniversary Box: The Journey of Chris Strachwitz, made an instructional DVD for guitarists on the music of Joseph Spence (part of a series issued by Stefan Grossman), and has curated and/or written liner notes for numerous CD compilations and re-releases.

After teaching on and off in the musicology department of the University of California Los Angeles for several years, he moved back to the Boston area and got a doctorate in ethnomusicology and sociolinguistics from Tufts University. He now lives in Philadelphia with his wife, ceramic artist Sandrine Sheon.

== Confronting myths ==
A recurring theme in Wald's work is to identify and confront myths, especially but not exclusively those that have come to surround prominent figures in popular music.

"Myths", Wald remarked in 2002, "are marvelous things, the keys to understanding a culture.

"For forty years, white folks have had this myth about Robert Johnson selling his soul to the Devil, and that says a great deal about white fantasies of blackness and its links to mysterious, sexy, forbidden powers.

"Back in 1936, black folks in the Delta had a different blues myth. It was that a guy who got good enough on guitar and learned how to play the latest hip sounds could get the hell out of the cotton fields and make enough money to move to Chicago, wear sharp new suits, and drive a Terraplane."

Indeed, his first book was a collaboration with his biologist mother entitled Exploding the Gene Myth, in which they wrote that "The myth of the all-powerful gene is based on flawed science that discounts the environment in which we and our genes exist." "There are no definitive histories," he would come to write in How the Beatles Destroyed Rock 'n' Roll (2009), "because the past keeps looking different as the present changes."

== Bibliography ==
=== Books ===
- Rock 'n' Roll: A Very Short Introduction, Oxford University Press, 2026 ISBN 9780197756744
- Jelly Roll Blues - Censored Songs & Hidden Histories. Hachette Books, 2024 ISBN 9780306831409
- Dylan Goes Electric! Newport, Seeger, Dylan, and the Night That Split the Sixties, 2015, ISBN 9780062366689.
- The Dozens: A History of Rap's Mama, Oxford University Press, 2012, ISBN 0-19-989540-6.
- The Blues: A Very Short Introduction, Oxford University Press, 2010, ISBN 0-19-539893-9.
- How the Beatles Destroyed Rock 'n' Roll: An Alternative History of American Popular Music, Oxford University Press, 2009, ISBN 978-0-19-534154-6.
- Global Minstrels: Voices of World Music, Routledge, 2006, ISBN 0-415-97929-3.
- Riding With Strangers: A Hitchhiker's Journey, Chicago Review Press, 2006, ISBN 1-55652-605-9.
- Dave Van Ronk: The Mayor of MacDougal Street (with Van Ronk), Da Capo, 2005, ISBN 0-306-81407-2.
- Escaping the Delta: Robert Johnson and the Invention of the Blues, Amistad, 2005, ISBN 0-06-052423-5.
- Narcocorrido: A Journey into the Music of Drugs, Guns and Guerrillas, HarperCollins, 2002, ISBN 978-0-06-050510-3, also published in Spanish as Narcocorrido: Un viaje dentro de la música de drogas, armas, y guerrilleros, Rayo, 2001, ISBN 978-0-06-093795-9.
- Josh White: Society Blues, University of Massachusetts Press, 2000, ISBN 1-55849-269-0.
- River of Song: A Musical Journey Down the Mississippi (co-authored with John Junkerman), St. Martin's Press, 1998, ISBN 0-312-20059-5.
- Exploding the Gene Myth: How Genetic Information Is Produced and Manipulated by Scientists, Physicians, Employers, Insurance Companies, Educators, and Law Enforcers (with Ruth Hubbard), Beacon Press, 1993, 1997, 1999; 1999 edition ISBN 0-8070-0431-6.

== Discography ==
- Street Corner Cowboys (CD, Black Rose Records, 2000)
- Dominic Kakolobango, African Acoustic (CD, Africassette, 2001); producer, acoustic guitar, liner notes
- Elijah Wald: Songster, Fingerpicker, Shirtmaker (LP, Reckless)

=== Liner notes, curatorship, etc. ===
This is a very partial list.

- Snooks Eaglin: New Orleans Street Singer (Smithsonian/Folkways; supervised 2005 reissue)
- The Arhoolie Records 40th Anniversary Box: "The Journey of Chris Strachwitz" (Arhoolie, 2002; co-produced and wrote liner notes)
- Dave Van Ronk: The Mayor of MacDougal Street (Rootstock, 2005; curated as a companion piece to the book of the same title)
- Back to the Crossroads: The Roots of Robert Johnson (Yazoo Records, 2005; curated as a companion piece to Escaping the Delta)
- Corridos y Narcocorridos (Fonovisa, 2002; curated as a companion piece to Narcocorridos)
- Josh White: Free and Equal Blues (Smithsonian/Folkways, 2000; curated as a companion piece to Josh White: Society Blues)
- The Mississippi: River of Song (Smithsonian/Folkways, 1999; two-CD set curated as a companion piece to the four-part television series and book of the same title)

== Videography ==
- The Guitar Stylings of Joseph Spence (instructional DVD, Stefan Grossman's Guitar Workshop)
