= George Wald =

Nobel Prize-winning American Scientist and Activist

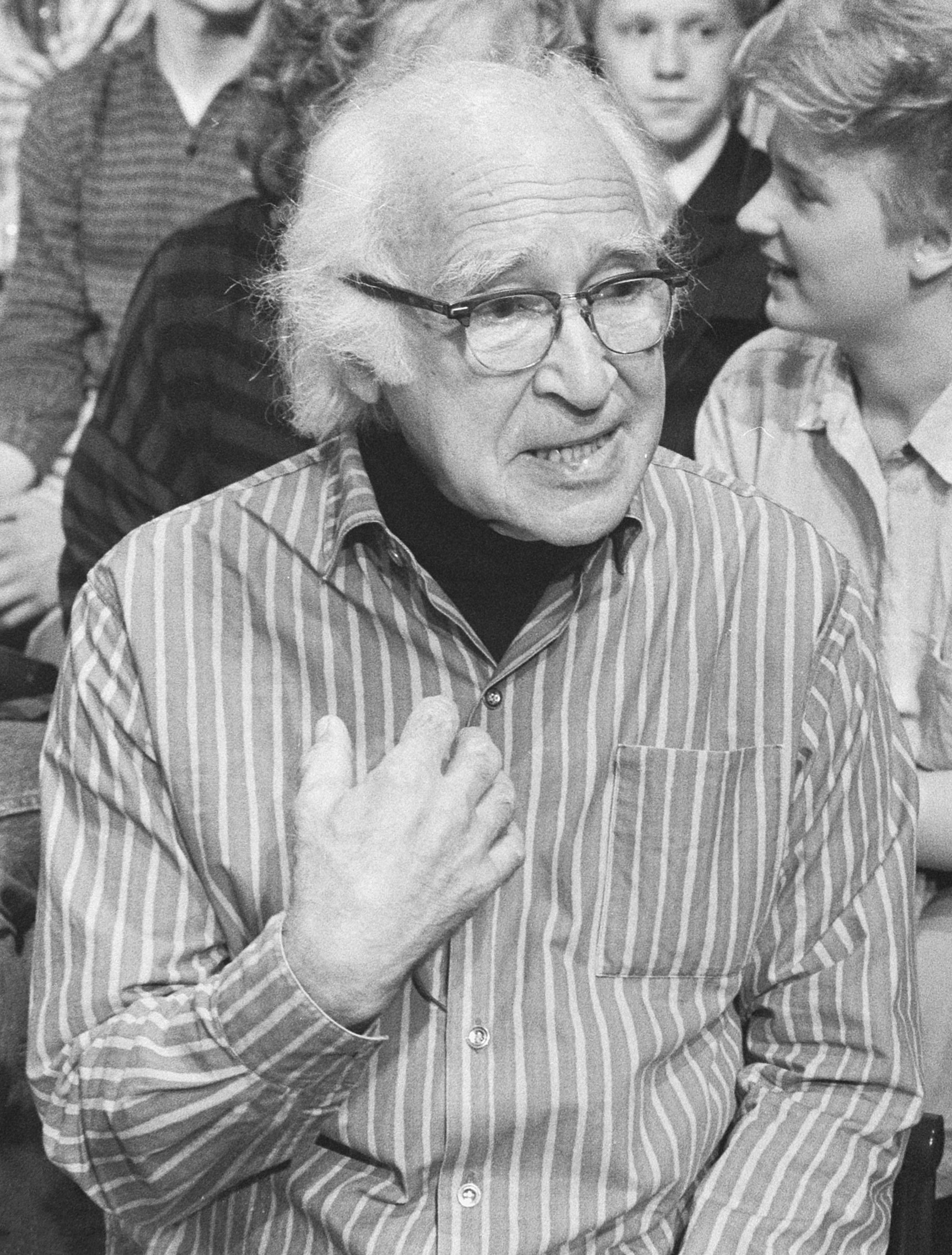
- George Wald in 1987
- Born: George Wald; November 18, 1906; New York, New York, U.S.
- Died: April 12, 1997 (aged 90); Cambridge, Massachusetts, U.S.
- Education: New York University; Columbia University
- Known for: Pigments in the retina Vertebrate visual opsin Wald's visual cycle
- Spouses: Frances Kingsley (m. 1931; div. ?) (1906–1980); Ruth Hubbard (m. 1958) (1924–2016)
- Children: 4
- Awards: Eli Lilly Award in Biological Chemistry (1939); Albert Lasker Award for Basic Medical Research (1953); Rumford Prize (1959); Guggenheim Fellowship (1963); Frederic Ives Medal (1966); Nobel Prize in Physiology or Medicine (1967); Massey Lecture (1970)
- Scientific career
- Fields: Neurobiology
- Workplaces: Harvard University; University of Chicago

George Wald (November 18, 1906 – April 12, 1997) was an American scientist and activist who studied pigments in the retina. He won a share of the 1967 Nobel Prize in Physiology or Medicine with Haldan Keffer Hartline and Ragnar Granit.

In 1970, Wald predicted that “civilization will end within 15 or 30 years unless immediate action is taken against problems facing mankind.”

== Biography ==
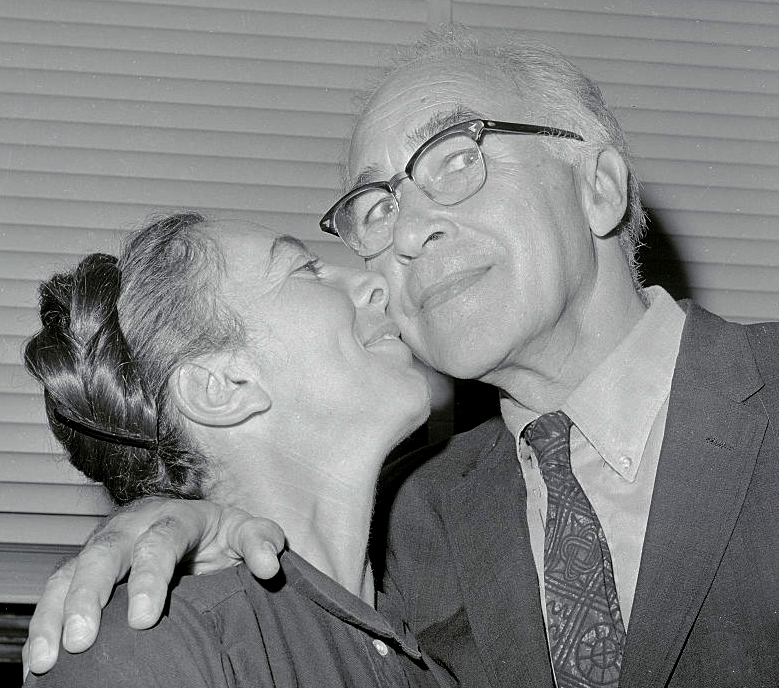
George Wald with wife Ruth Hubbard in 1967

George Wald was born in New York City, the son of Ernestine (Rosenmann) and Isaac Wald, Jewish immigrant parents. He was a member of the first graduating class of the Brooklyn Technical High School in New York in 1923. He received his Bachelor of Science degree from New York University in 1927 and his PhD in zoology from Columbia University in 1932. After graduating, he received a travel grant from the US National Research Council. Wald used this grant to work in Germany with Otto Heinrich Warburg where he identified vitamin A in the retina. Wald then went on to work in Zürich, Switzerland, with the discoverer of vitamin A, Paul Karrer. Wald then worked briefly with Otto Fritz Meyerhof in Heidelberg, Germany, but left Europe for the University of Chicago in 1933 when Adolf Hitler came to power and life in Europe became more dangerous for Jews. In 1934, Wald went to Harvard University where he became an instructor, then a professor.

Wald was elected to the American Academy of Arts and Sciences in 1948. He was elected to the National Academy of Sciences in 1950, the American Philosophical Society in 1958, and in 1967 was awarded the Nobel Prize for Physiology or Medicine for his discoveries in vision. In 1966 he was awarded the Frederic Ives Medal by the OSA and in 1967 the Paul Karrer Gold Medal of the University of Zurich. In 1992, he was elected an Honorary Member of OSA.

Wald discussing the likelihood of life on other planets in Who's Out There? (1973)

Wald spoke out on many political and social issues and his fame as a Nobel laureate brought national and international attention to his views. He was a pacifist and vocal opponent of the Vietnam War and the nuclear arms race. Speaking at MIT in 1969 Wald said, "Our government has become preoccupied with death, with the business of killing and being killed." In 1980, he served as part of Ramsey Clark's delegation to Iran during the Iran hostage crisis.

With a small number of other Nobel laureates, he was invited in 1986 to fly to Moscow to advise Mikhail Gorbachev on a number of environmental questions. While there, he questioned Gorbachev about the arrest, detention and exile of Yelena Bonner and her husband, fellow Nobel laureate Andrei Sakharov (Peace prize, 1975). Wald reported that Gorbachev said he knew nothing about it. Bonner and Sakharov were released shortly thereafter, in December 1986.

A member of the Circumcision Resource Center in Boston, he was one of the first scientists committed against circumcision but his article "Circumcision", rejected by The New York Times in 1975, was published in 2012 only by an English magazine.

Wald died in Cambridge, Massachusetts. He was married twice: in 1931 to Frances Kingsley (1906–1980) and in 1958 to the biochemist Ruth Hubbard. He had two sons with Kingsley—Michael and David; he and Hubbard had a son—musicologist and musician Elijah Wald—and a daughter, Deborah, a family law attorney. He was an atheist.

== Scientific career ==
Wald plotted the absorbance of rod pigment (black curve), then later the absorbance of cone pigments (red, green, and blue curves).

As a postdoctoral researcher, Wald discovered that vitamin A was a component of the retina. His further experiments showed that when the pigment rhodopsin was exposed to light, it yielded the protein opsin and a compound containing vitamin A. This suggested that vitamin A was essential in retinal function.

In the 1950s, Wald and his colleagues used chemical methods to extract pigments from the retina. Then, using a spectrophotometer, they were able to measure the light absorbance of the pigments. Since the absorbance of light by retina pigments corresponds to the wavelengths that best activate photoreceptor cells, this experiment showed the wavelengths that the eye could best detect. However, since rod cells make up most of the retina, what Wald and his colleagues were specifically measuring was the absorbance of rhodopsin, the main photopigment in rods. Later, with a technique called microspectrophotometry, he was able to measure the absorbance directly from cells, rather than from an extract of the pigments. This allowed Wald to determine the absorbance of pigments in the cone cells.

== See also ==
- List of Jewish Nobel laureates
- Retinal
