= Veritas Entertainment =

American film production company

- Type: Private
- Industry: Production
- Founder: Alan Gasmer Peter Jaysen
- Headquarters: California, United States
- Website: www.veritas-ent.com

Veritas Entertainment is an American independent film and television production company founded in 2014 that focuses on optioning IPs, particularly books, and developing them into fully packaged projects ready for production.

The company is run by industry veterans Alan Gasmer and Peter Jaysen. Alan Gasmer, a former senior agent at William Morris Agency was once described by Vanity Fair as "the King of Specs" for his role in the spec screenplay marketplace. His contributions have led to the production of several major films, including Rush Hour, Soul Food, Cowboys & Aliens, Mouse Hunt, Empire Records, and NBC's Las Vegas.

Peter Jaysen, with over three decades of experience in content creation and monetization across film, television, digital, and branded entertainment, is a media executive and Academy Award nominated/BAFTA nominated/Golden Globe nominated/Emmy-nominated producer.

Jaysen, along with Gasmer, won the Producers Guild of America Award for Best Television Movie for Fahrenheit 451 on HBO in 2018.

== Filmography ==
Film	Year	Produced With	Notes
A Complete Unknown	2024	Searchlight Pictures	Starring Timothée Chalamet, Elle Fanning, Edward Norton, and Monica Barbaro

== Television ==
Series	Initial Release	Produced With	Notes
A Spy Among Friends	2022	MGM+/ITVX	Starring Damian Lewis & Guy Pearce Created by Alex Cary
Vikings Valhalla	2022	Netflix	Created by Jeb Stuart
The Mosquito Coast	2021	Apple TV	Starring Justin Theroux/Created by Neil Cross
Dublin Murders	2019	Starz/BBC	Created by Sarah Phelps
Fahrenheit 451	2018	HBO	Written & Directed by Ramin Bahrani/ PGA Award Winner
Elvis Presley: The Searcher	2018	HBO	Directed by Thom Zimny
American Playboy	2017	Amazon	Directed by Richard Lopez
You Me Her	2016	AT&T/Netflix	Created by John Scott Shepherd
Iverson	2014	Showtime	Directed by Zatella Beatty
Vikings	2013	History Channel	Created By Michael Hirst
