= Raffaele Ruotolo =

American soccer player

Personal information
- Date of birth: May 15, 1965 (age 61)
- Place of birth: Brooklyn, New York, U.S.
- Height: 5 ft 9 in (1.75 m)
- Position: Midfielder

Youth career
- 1981: Casalnuovo
- 1982–1983: Napoli

Senior career*
Years	Team	Apps	(Gls)
1984	San Diego Sockers	0	(0)
1984–1988	San Diego Sockers (indoor)	123	(22)
1993	Los Angeles United (indoor)		
1994–1996	Anaheim Splash (indoor)	68	(65)
- * Club domestic league appearances and goals

Raffaele Ruotolo (born May 15, 1965) is an American retired soccer midfielder who played professionally in the North American Soccer League and Major Indoor Soccer League and Continental Indoor Soccer League.

When he was five, Ruotolo moved to Naples, Italy with his family. In 1981, he began his career with local amateur club Casalnuovo. In 1982, he moved to Napoli. In 1984, Ruotolo visited an uncle in San Diego, California. While there, he had a successful trial with the San Diego Sockers of the North American Soccer League. Although signed before the outdoor season, Ruotolo never earned spot on the first team. However, he worked his way into the Sockers indoor team that fall. He gradually became a regular starter, seeing time in forty-five games during the 1987–1988 season. Despite that, the Sockers released Ruotolo on October 20, 1988. Coach Ron Newman stated, ""I felt the roster was too offensive minded. Right now it is critical for us to improve our defense." Ruotolo was a defensive midfielder, but tended to play a more offensive role. On June 1, 1993, the Los Angeles United selected Ruotolo in the first round of the 1993 Continental Indoor Soccer League supplemental draft. In 1994, new ownership moved United to Anaheim and renamed it the Anaheim Splash. In September 1996, Ruotolo left the Splash.

Ruotolo also played in the American Beach Soccer circuit and the United States national beach soccer team during the 1990s.
