= Paul Karrer Gold Medal =

Swiss chemistry award

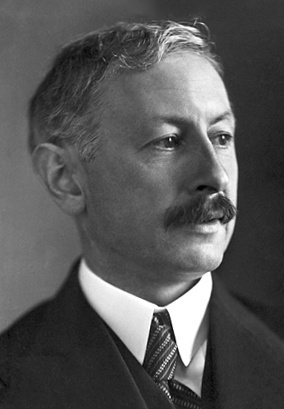
Paul Karrer.

The Paul Karrer Gold Medal and Lecture is awarded annually or biennially by the University of Zurich to an outstanding researcher in the field of chemistry. It was established in 1959 by a group of leading companies, including CIBA AG, J.R. Geigy, F. Hoffmann-La Roche & Co. AG, Sandoz AG, Société des Produits Nestlé AG and Dr. A. Wander AG, to honour the Swiss organic chemist and Nobel laureate Paul Karrer on his 70th birthday.

The Medal was created by Swiss sculptor Hermann Hubacher; the obverse depicts a relief of Paul Karrer and the reverse is engraved with the words University of Zurich - Paul Karrer Lecture. The lecture itself is delivered at the University of Zurich.

The recipients to date (2015) have represented most of the important research institutions of Europe and the USA and include nine Nobel Prize winners for chemistry or medicine.

== Recipients ==
Source: University of Zurich

- 2024: Katalin Kariko
- 2022: Stephen L. Buchwald
- 2019: Makoto Fujita
- 2017: Herbert Waldmann
- 2015: Paul Knochel
- 2013: Stefan W. Hell
- 2011: Michael Grätzel
- 2009: Akira Suzuki
- 2008: Albert Eschenmoser
- 2007: Steven V. Ley C.B.E., F.R.S.
- 2005: Robert H. Grubbs
- 2004: Ada Yonath
- 2002: Dieter Oesterhelt
- 2000: Kyriacos C. Nicolaou
- 1998: Ahmed H. Zewail
- 1996: Jacqueline K. Barton
- 1994: Stuart L. Schreiber
- 1992: Hans Paulsen
- 1989: Duilio Arigoni
- 1986: Koji Nakanishi
- 1984: Jack E. Baldwin
- 1982: Elias J. Corey
- 1979: Hans Kuhn
- 1977: Alan R. Battersby
- 1976: Otto Isler
- 1974: Vladimir Prelog
- 1973: Egbertus Havinga
- 1972: Georg Wittig
- 1971: Bernhard Witkop
- 1970: Adolfo Quilico
- 1969: Robert Schwyzer
- 1968: Kurt Mothes
- 1967: Georg Wald
- 1966: Gerold K. Schwarzenbach
- 1965: Axel Hugo T. Theorell
- 1964: Edgar Lederer
- 1963: Severo Ochoa
- 1962: Lord Alexander R. Todd
- 1961: Arne W.K. Tiselius
- 1960: Clemens Schöpf
- 1959: Arthur Stoll

== See also ==
- List of chemistry awards
- Prizes named after people
