= Peter S. Pezzati =

American portrait artist

- Pezzati at work in his studio in 1971
- Born: Peter S. Pezzati; September 18, 1902; Roxbury, Massachusetts, United States
- Died: February 19, 1993 (aged 90); Westwood, Massachusetts, United States
- Other name: Pietro S. Pezzati
- Education: Child-Walker School of Arts and Crafts
- Known for: Portrait Painting
- Movement: Renaissance
- Family: Jennifer Raskin grand-daughter, Carla Rotolo (niece)

Peter Pezzati (September 18, 1902 – February 19, 1993) was an American portrait artist who was located in the Boston area. His art was rooted in the Renaissance tradition. His artwork included landscapes, pen and ink drawings, watercolors, pastel and oil portraits.

== Early life ==
He was born Peter S. Pezzati to Italian immigrant parents, Sisto and Cesarina (Opizzi) Pezzati, in Roxbury, Massachusetts.

Pezzati graduated from Boston College High School in 1917 where he studied both Latin and Greek. He was to eventually master six languages. He then won a scholarship to the Child-Walker School of Arts and Crafts in Boston; there he studied under American painter Charles Hopkinson, who took him on as an assistant.

In the mid-1920s he taught art at the Child-Walker School for two years, then went on a six-month traveling and painting tour of Europe, especially France and Italy, arriving back in Boston just in time to attend his sister Josephine's wedding on February 19, 1928, where he was the best man of Bruno Ferroli. He continued to apprentice under Hopkinson, and worked at Hopkinson's Fenway studio.

== Art career ==
Pezzati painted many eminent Bostonians and Americans such as Ralph Lowell, William L. Kenly, Willard Van Orman Quine, and Austin Warren. His paintings are hanging in institutions across the United States, including Massachusetts General Hospital, Symphony Hall, The Massachusetts Historical Society, The Museum of Fine Arts in Boston Harvard University, and the Smithsonian Institution. His portraits have also been exhibited at the Margaret Brown and Vose Galleries in Boston, at the Corcoran Biennial in Washington, D.C. at various times from 1930 to 1939, the Pennsylvania Academy Exhibition, the 1939 World's Fair, Yale University Art Gallery and the National Gallery of Art in Washington.

== Later life ==
Pezzati married Mary E. Palmer of Boston in about 1942. They had two children, Pamela born in 1944. and Peter. He was interviewed by the Smithsonian on July 15, 1971 as part of the Archives of American Art's Oral History Program. He also donated some of his personal papers to the Archives of American Art between 1971 and 1983.

He was a member of the Dante Society of America. On February 19, 1993 Pezzati died, at the age of ninety, of cerebral vascular disease in Westwood, Massachusetts, where he had retired with his second wife, Dr. Madeleine Field Crawford after having lived in Needham, Massachusetts for over twenty years.

His granddaughter Jennifer Raskin is a television producer and filmmaker. His nieces were Carla Rotolo and her sister Suze.

== Sources ==
- The Artists Bluebook: 34,000 North American Artists to March 2005, Lonnie Pierson Dunbier, 2005, page 479.
- New England Historic Genealogical Society Sisto Alfonso Pezzati: His Descendants, by Eric Bruno Borgman, 1992.
- Who's Who in American Art, Jacques Cattell Press, 1986, page 1292.
- Index of Artists, Daniel Trowbridge Mallett, 1948, page 811.
