= Mary Rotolo =

American journalist (1910 – 1990)

- Born: Mary Theresa Pezzati; January 28, 1910; Roxbury, Massachusetts, United States
- Died: September 27, 1990 (aged 80); Norwood Hospital, Norwood, Massachusetts, United States
- Occupations: Journalist; reporter; correspondent; publisher; political activist
- Family: Peter S. Pezzati (older brother)

Mary Teresa Pezzati Rotolo Bowes (January 28, 1910 – September 27, 1990) was an American writer and political activist. Her daughters were Carla and Suze Rotolo. Suze Rotolo was one of Bob Dylan's early girlfriends in New York City.

== Early life ==
Mary Teresa Pezzati was born in Roxbury, Massachusetts, on January 28, 1910, the daughter of Italian immigrants Sisto Pezzati and his wife Cesarina (née Opizzi). Her older brother was Peter S. "Pietro" Pezzati, who was a noted American portrait painter.

While in Boston, Rotolo dated B. F. Skinner and was acquainted with Conlon Nancarrow, who later renounced his American citizenship because of his membership in the Communist Party. In the 1930s, she traveled to Spain supposedly to report on the Spanish Civil War. However, she was, in fact, working for the communists as a courier between Spain and Italy supplying American passports for Italian communists so they could leave Italy and join the International Brigades fighting in Spain. On her return, she went to New York City, where she wrote for various liberal newspapers.

== Marriage and children ==
Mary was married three times. She first married Dominic Testa in Boston, Massachusetts, on March 28, 1933. On July 1, 1933 while taking a sailboat trip along the Eastern United States coast her husband fell overboard and drowned. His body was never recovered.

In March 1940, she married Joachim Rotolo in New York and they had two daughters, Carla and Susan (Suze). Mary and her husband were also friends with American writer Charles Flato who, it was discovered only in the 1990s, was a Soviet spy.

Joachim Rotolo died of a heart attack on February 18, 1958, before Suze met and lived with Bob Dylan in the early 1960s. When Mary's daughters knew Bob Dylan she thought very little of him and later remembered him as "a twerp" and informed Bob Dylan biographer Howard Sounes, that he had "green teeth", was not generous with money, and that his attitude left a lot to be desired adding: "I didn't trust him and I didn't like him and I certainly didn't want him living under the same roof as my daughter."

Rotolo married Dr. Frederick P. Bowes on January 8, 1962, in Hoboken, New Jersey. They moved to Santa Teresa di Gallura (Sardinia) where they lived most of their lives together.

Rotolo predeceased her husband and died at Norwood Hospital in Norwood, Massachusetts, on September 27, 1990, from lung cancer.

Dylan said about his girlfriend Suze's mother: "Mary, though, who worked as a translator for medical journals, wasn't having it. Mary lived on the top floor of an apartment building on Sheridan Square and treated me like I had the clap. If she would have had her way, the cops would have locked me up. Suze's mom was a small feisty woman-volatile with black eyes like twin coals that could burn a hole through you, and was very protective. Always make you feel like you did something wrong. She thought I had a nameless way of life and would never be able to support anybody, but I think it went much deeper than that. I think I just came in at a bad time. She glared at me, cigarette in her mouth. She was always trying to goad me into some kind of argument. My presence was so displeasing to her, but it's not like I'd caused any trouble in her life. It wasn't me who was responsible for the loss of Suze's father or anything. Once I said to her that I didn't think she was being fair. She stared squarely into my eyes like she was staring at some distant, visible object and said to me, 'Do me a favor, don't think when I'm around.' Suze would tell me later that she didn't mean it. She did mean it, though. She did everything in her power to keep us apart, but we went on seeing each other anyway."

Mary Pezzati's concerns as to Dylan's character were realized to a certain extent when Suze Rotolo discovered that he was not only conducting an affair with Joan Baez, but also with a married woman, Sara Lownds and also expressed a desire to continue his relationship with Rotolo.
