= Pietro Pezzati (artist) =

Italian painter

Pietro Pezzati (1828–1890) was an Italian painter.

Born in Tuscany, he was a resident of Livorno. He exhibited at the Promotrice of Florence: Il mio diletto a me ed io a lui and a Holy Family. In 1886, at the Exhibition of Livorno, he displayed another depicting: Virgin and Child. Pezzati mainly painted sacred subjects.

He painted the altarpiece of San Giovanni Gualberto in prayer visited by the Divine Light (1856) found in the Chapel of San Giovanni Gualberto located near Tavarnelle Val di Pesa.
