= Suze Rotolo =

American artist (1943–2011)

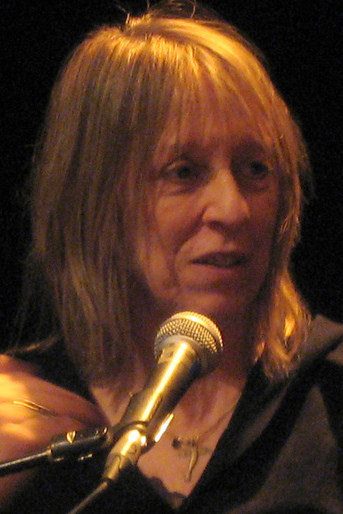
- Rotolo in 2009
- Born: November 20, 1943; Prospect Heights, New York, U.S.
- Died: February 25, 2011 (aged 67); New York City, U.S.
- Occupation: Artist
- Known for: Appearing on the cover of The Freewheelin' Bob Dylan
- Spouse: Enzo Bartoccioli (m. 1967)
- Partner: Bob Dylan (1961–1964)
- Children: 1

Susan Elizabeth Rotolo (November 20, 1943 – February 25, 2011), known as Suze Rotolo (/ˈsuːziː/ SOO-zee), was an American artist and political activist. From 1961 to 1964, she was in a relationship with musician Bob Dylan. Dylan later acknowledged her strong influence on his music and art during that period. Rotolo is the woman walking with him on the cover of his 1963 album The Freewheelin' Bob Dylan, a photograph by the Columbia Records studio photographer Don Hunstein. In her book A Freewheelin' Time: A Memoir of Greenwich Village in the Sixties, Rotolo described her time with Dylan and other figures in the folk music and bohemian scene in Greenwich Village, New York. She discussed her upbringing as a "red diaper" baby; a child of Communist Party USA members during the McCarthy Era. As an artist, she specialized in artists' books and taught at the Parsons School of Design in New York City.

== Biography ==
=== The Freewheelin' years, 1961–1964 ===
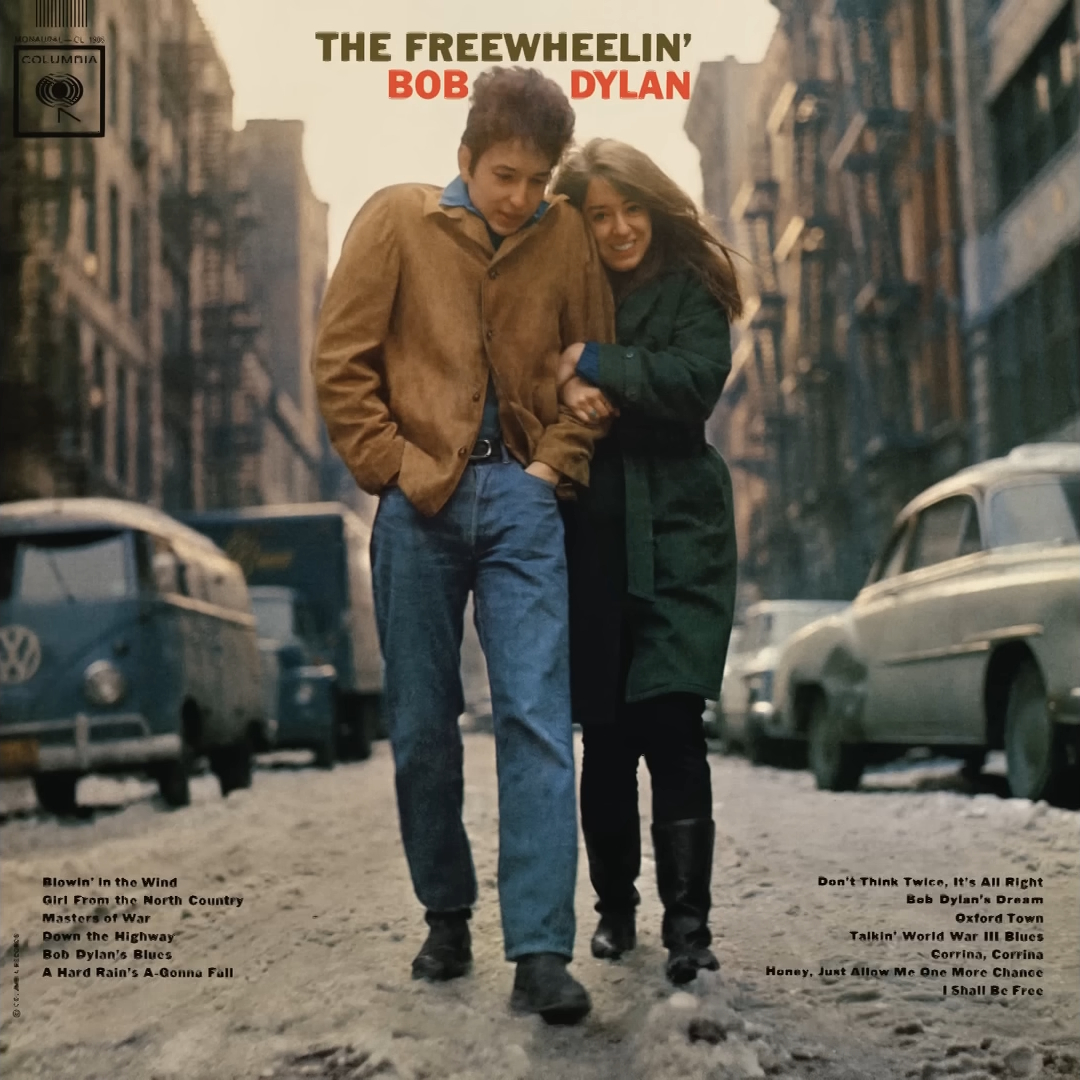
Cover art for the 1963 album The Freewheelin' Bob Dylan, showing Bob Dylan walking with Suze Rotolo, in a photograph by Don Hunstein. She was unhappy at being defined by the image, and the relationship with Dylan which it portrays, but reclaimed the photo for her 2008 autobiography, A Freewheelin' Time.

Rotolo, of Italian-American descent, was born at Brooklyn Jewish Hospital in the Prospect Heights neighborhood in Brooklyn, New York, and raised in Sunnyside, Queens. Her parents were Joachim and Mary (née Pezzati) Rotolo, who were members of the American Communist Party. In June 1960, she graduated from Bryant High School.

At about the time she met Dylan, Rotolo began working full-time as a political activist in the office of the Congress of Racial Equality (CORE), and the anti-nuclear group SANE. She and her sister Carla had also entered the Greenwich Village folk scene. Rotolo first met Dylan at a Riverside Church folk concert in July 1961. They were introduced by Carla, who at that time was working as an assistant to folklorist Alan Lomax. Describing their meeting in his memoir, Chronicles, Volume One, Dylan wrote:

Right from the start I couldn’t take my eyes off her. She was the most erotic thing I’d ever seen. She was fair skinned and golden haired, full-blood Italian. The air was suddenly filled with banana leaves. We started talking and my head started to spin. Cupid’s arrow had whistled past my ears before, but this time it hit me in the heart and the weight of it dragged me overboard... Meeting her was like stepping into the tales of 1001 Arabian Nights. She had a smile that could light up a street full of people and was extremely lively, had a kind of voluptuousness—a Rodin sculpture come to life.

It was not until they met that Dylan's writing began to address issues such as the civil rights movement and the threat of nuclear war. They started living together in early 1962, much to the disapproval of her family. As Dylan's fame grew, Rotolo found the relationship increasingly stressful. She wrote:

Bob was charismatic: he was a beacon, a lighthouse, he was also a black hole. He required committed backup and protection I was unable to provide consistently, probably because I needed them myself. ... I could no longer cope with all the pressure, gossip, truth and lies that living with Bob entailed. I was unable to find solid ground. I was on quicksand and very vulnerable.

Rotolo left New York in June 1962, with her mother, to spend six months studying art at the University of Perugia in Italy. She was known there as Justine Rotolo, having used an invented middle name to register as "S. Justine Rotolo". Dylan didn't want her to go and the separation from his girlfriend has been credited as the inspiration behind several of his finest love songs, including "Don't Think Twice, It's Alright", "Tomorrow Is a Long Time", "One Too Many Mornings", and "Boots of Spanish Leather".

Rotolo's political views were widely regarded as having influenced Dylan's topical songwriting. Dylan also credited her with interesting him in the French poet Arthur Rimbaud, who heavily influenced his writing style. The influence of Bertolt Brecht on Dylan's songwriting has also been acknowledged by Dylan as stemming from Rotolo's participation in Brechtian theater during their relationship. In Chronicles, Dylan describes the impact of the song "Pirate Jenny" while attending a Brecht show on which Rotolo worked. Dylan's interest in painting can also be traced back to his relationship with Rotolo, who had emphasized her shared values with Dylan in an interview with author Robbie Woliver:

People say I was an influence on him, but we influenced each other. His interests were filtered through me and my interests, like the books I had, were filtered through him ... It was always sincere on his part. The guy saw things. He had an incredible ability to see and sponge—there was a genius in that. The ability to create out of everything that's flying around. To synthesize it. To put it in words and music."

Rotolo became pregnant in 1963 by Dylan and had an abortion. Their relationship failed to survive the abortion, Dylan's ever-growing fame, the long-term effects from Rotolo's extended trip to Italy, Dylan's affair with Joan Baez, and the hostility of the Rotolo family. Suze moved into her sister's apartment in August 1963. She and Dylan broke up in 1964, in circumstances which Dylan described in his "Ballad in Plain D". Twenty years later he apologized for the song, saying: "I must have been a real schmuck to write that. I look back at that particular one and say, of all the songs I've written, maybe I could have left that alone."

=== Later life and death, 1964–2011 ===
Rotolo traveled to Cuba in June 1964, with a group, although it was unlawful for United States citizens to do so. She was quoted as saying, in regard to opponents of Fidel Castro that, "These gusanos are not suppressed. There can be open criticism of the regime. As long as they keep it to talk they are tolerated, as long as there is no sabotage."

Rotolo married Enzo Bartoccioli, an Italian film editor who worked for the United Nations, in 1967. Together they had one son, Luca, who is a guitarist in New York. In New York, Rotolo worked as an illustrator and painter, before concentrating on creating book art, things resembling books but incorporating found objects. Remaining politically active, Rotolo joined the street-theater group Billionaires for Bush and protested at the 2004 Republican National Convention in Manhattan.

Rotolo avoided discussing her relationship with Dylan for decades. In July 2004, she was interviewed in a documentary produced by New York PBS Channel 13 and The New York Daily News. In November 2004, she made an unannounced appearance at the Experience Music Project, on a panel discussing Dylan's early days in Greenwich Village. She and her husband also were involved in putting on a memorial event for Dave Van Ronk after the singer's death in 2002. Rotolo made an appearance in Martin Scorsese's documentary film, No Direction Home: Bob Dylan, which focused on Dylan's early career from 1961 to 1966. This film was broadcast as part of the American Masters series on PBS public television in September 2005. Rotolo was also interviewed nationally in 2008 by Terry Gross on NPR's Fresh Air to promote her book, A Freewheelin' Time: A Memoir of Greenwich Village in the Sixties, which was published by Broadway Books on May 13, 2008. Rotolo recounted her attempts not to be overshadowed by her relationship with Dylan. She discussed her need to pursue her artistic creativity and to retain her political integrity, concluding:

The sixties were an era that spoke a language of inquiry and curiosity and rebelliousness against the stifling and repressive political and social culture of the decade that preceded it. The new generation causing all the fuss was not driven by the market: we had something to say, not something to sell."

The image of Rotolo walking with Dylan on the cover of The Freewheelin' Bob Dylan proved impossible to shake off, but equally difficult to accept. The New York Times, reviewing her book, observed that

Even 40 years later, she seems uncomfortable delving into her time with Dylan. Perhaps an inherent contradiction is the problem: she’s writing about her unwillingness to be defined by her relationship to a famous man, in a book with Dylan on the cover.

The Guardian, too, notes that Rotolo is defined as "the girl with the wistful eyes and hint of a smile whose head is resting on the suede-jacketed shoulder of a nice-looking young man as they trudge through the snow on the cover of 1963's The Freewheelin' Bob Dylan." The review agrees with the New York Times's comment ("a disconnected list") that the book is "oddly organised", but at once adds "though not as random as it seems". Nathalie Rothschild, writing in The Guardian after Rotolo's death, noted that Rotolo had worked hard to escape the epithets of "Bob Dylan's muse" and "the girl on the front cover of The Freewheelin' Bob Dylan", insisting in her memoir that she had been more than "a string on Dylan's guitar".

Rotolo died of lung cancer at her home in New York City's NoHo neighborhood on February 25, 2011, aged 67.

== Film portrayals ==
In the 2007 film I'm Not There, a fictional account of Bob Dylan's life, there is a version of Rotolo's relationship with Dylan. Heath Ledger plays Robbie Clark, one of six Dylan-based characters in the film. Charlotte Gainsbourg plays Claire, the wife of Robbie. This character has been described as a combination of Sara Dylan, Dylan's first wife, and Suze Rotolo. In the film, Robbie meets Claire in a Greenwich Village diner and they fall in love. The scene in which Robbie and Claire run romantically through the streets of New York re-enacts the cover of the 1963 album The Freewheelin' Bob Dylan.

In the 2024 biographical film A Complete Unknown, Sylvie Russo, a fictional version of Rotolo, is played by Elle Fanning. Dylan requested that the film not use Rotolo's real name. Angie Martoccio of Rolling Stone described the Russo character as "Rotolo in all but name".

== Sources ==
- Dylan, Bob (2004). Chronicles: Volume One. Simon & Schuster. p. 293. ISBN 0-7432-2815-4.
- Flanagan, Bill (1990). Written In My Soul. Omnibus Press. ISBN 0-7119-2224-1.
- Gray, Michael (2006). The Bob Dylan Encyclopedia. Continuum International. ISBN 0-8264-6933-7.
- Heylin, Clinton (2003). Bob Dylan: Behind the Shades Revisited. Perennial Currents. ISBN 0-06-052569-X.
- Rotolo, Suze (2009). A Freewheelin' Time. Aurum Press. ISBN 978-0-7679-2688-1.
- Shelton, Robert (2003) [1986]. No Direction Home. Da Capo Press. p. 576. ISBN 0-306-81287-8.
- Sounes, Howard (2001). Down The Highway: The Life Of Bob Dylan. Grove Press. ISBN 0-8021-1686-8.
- Woliver, Robbie (1994). Hoot! A 25-Year History of the Greenwich Village Music Scene. St.Martin's Press. ISBN 0-312-10995-4.
