= Carla Rotolo =

American artist, singer and folk music researcher

- Born: March 5, 1941
- Died: August 25, 2014 (aged 73); Santa Teresa di Gallura
- Occupation(s): Artist, folk singer, folk music researcher
- Family: Mary Rotolo (mother), Suze Rotolo (sister)

Carla Rotolo (March 5, 1941 – August 25, 2014) was an American artist, folk singer and folk music researcher.

== Early life ==
Rotolo was the first child of Joachim Rotolo and Mary (Pezzati) Rotolo, who were union activists. Mary was a writer and editor for several union newspapers, and Joachim painted worker murals.

Like her mother, Rotolo was a political activist, but she also followed in her artist father's footsteps, painting, drawing and sculpting. She worked as a set decorator for many off-Broadway plays and shows in New York. Her younger sister Suze often joined her.

== Greenwich Village years ==
In the early 1960s Rotolo was an assistant to the eminent folklorist and musicologist Alan Lomax. She accompanied him on his excursions down South to record remote folk singers. Rotolo helped with the 1960 release of 12 folk albums for the Prestige International Records label.

She was involved with the Greenwich Village folk scene, and was friends with Dave Van Ronk, dated the folk singer Paul Clayton and knew many of the most prominent people in the Village. Rotolo appears in the Alan Lomax documentary Ballads, Blues and Blue Grass, which was released in 2012.

=== Relationship with Bob Dylan ===
In 1961, Rotolo became aware of Bob Dylan. According to author Robert Shelton, Rotolo "came up with an idea to help record Dylan and some other unknowns.... [B]ecause of the urgings of...Carla in particular, and my interest in reviewing, Mike Porco booked Bob into Folk City for two weeks." Rotolo occasionally sang three-part harmony with Van Ronk and Dylan. She later introduced her seventeen-year-old sister Suze to Dylan, which led to a three-year relationship.

After Suze and Dylan broke up in Rotolo's apartment, Dylan featured Rotolo in his 1964 song "Ballad in Plain D", labeling her the "parasite sister". When interviewed by Howard Sounes for his 2001 Dylan biography, Down the Highway: The Life of Bob Dylan, Rotolo stated: "I remember it being a terrible experience". She told Sounes that when she heard the song, she had no doubt the "parasite" referred to herself.

Rotolo resented the term, stating: "I got dragged into something that, frankly by then I didn't give a fuck about, because Suze was going to choose whoever she liked, I couldn't keep sitting in my no-door room with screaming and yelling going on [sic]." She stated that on the night in question she had asked Dylan to leave her apartment, but he refused to go and pushed her. She pushed him back and a physical fight almost ensued; according to Rotolo, friends had to be called and Dylan forcibly removed. Rotolo was left with a very negative view of Dylan, considering him selfish, manipulative, and emotionally immature.

== Later life ==
In 1970, Rotolo married Rolando Peña, a Venezuelan artist and actor. During the 1970s she worked for the controversial Grove Press run by Barney Rosset, and later as former baseball player Joe Garagiola's personal assistant during his years at NBC. Afterwards she worked as a proofreader and copy editor at various publications.

In 1986, Rotolo was credited with compiling the recordings for a 134-track Bob Dylan bootleg collection called Zimmerman: Ten of Swords. It is considered the "most famous Bob Dylan bootleg of all time". In a shot at Bob Dylan's "Ballad in Plain D", printed on the back of the multi-record set is, "This album was compiled by: Carla Rotolo, chairperson of the board, P.S.A.* (* Parasite Sisters Anonymous)."

Right after the Dylan bootleg release, Rotolo moved to Sardinia, Italy, to look after her aged mother and step-father. She made two extensive trips back to the States in 1998 and 2005, visiting friends and relatives.

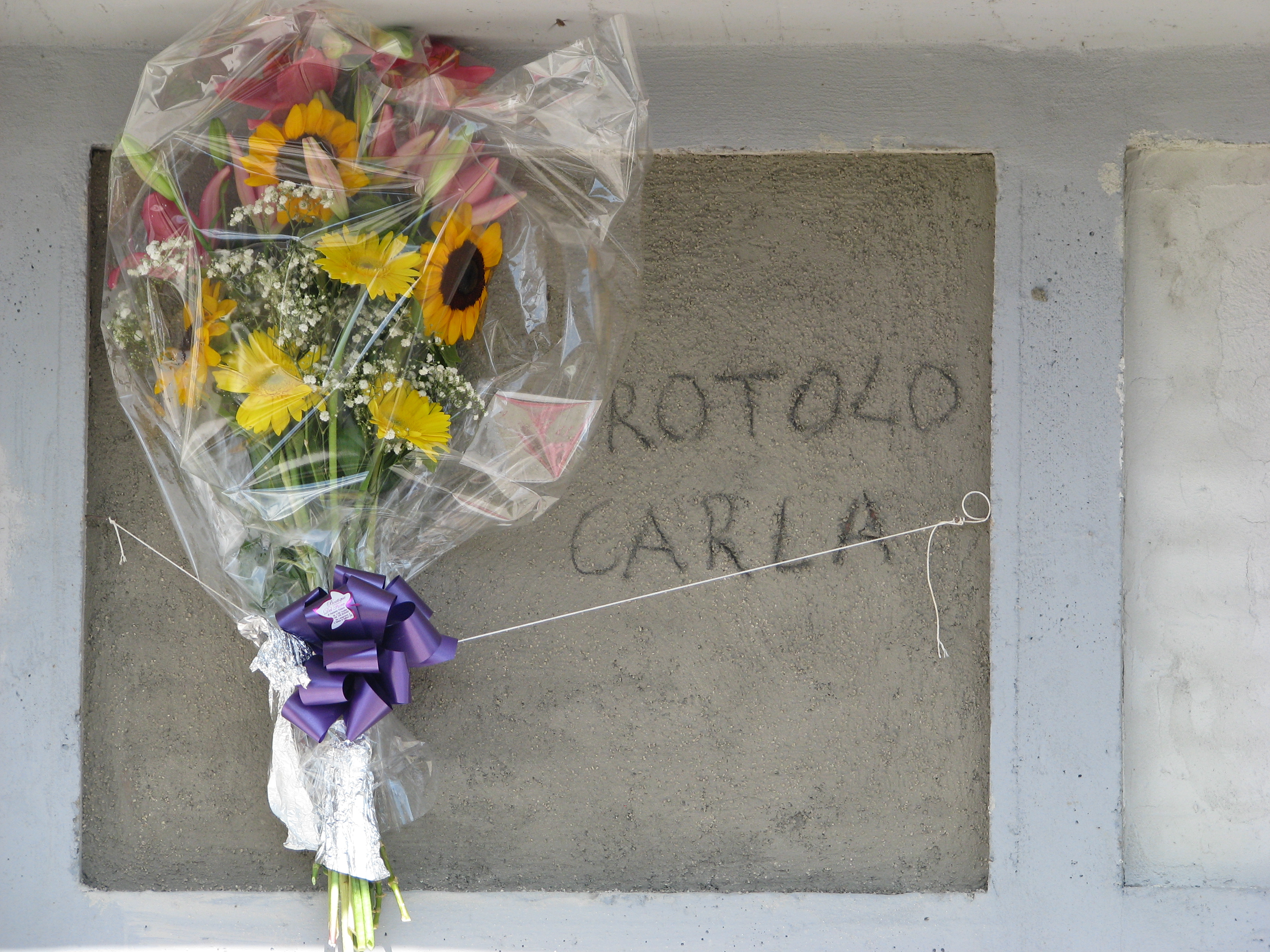
Carla Rotolo's grave, 2014

In 2014, Carla Rotolo was portrayed by actress Jaime Babbitt in the Larry Mollin play Search: Paul Clayton – A True Tale of Love, Folk Music and Betrayal at the Martha's Vineyard Playhouse in Vineyard Haven, Massachusetts.

Rotolo continued to be politically active while living abroad and took part in several conservationist rallies and other efforts to bring awareness to the plight of animals and the natural environment. She staunchly supported the World Wildlife Fund and Doctors Without Borders, as well as many other causes.

== Death ==
Rotolo died from a bad fall in the kitchen of her condo in Santa Teresa di Gallura and was buried September 3, 2014, at the Buoncammino Cemetery outside of town.
