= Highway 51 Blues =

1938 song by Curtis Jones

Song by Curtis Jones
- Released: January 25, 1938
- Songwriter: Curtis Jones

"Highway 51 Blues" was the title of a song composed by American blues pianist Curtis Jones, released on a 78 record on January 12, 1938, which was popular enough to spawn several covers and offshoots, including "New Highway 51," recorded in 1940 by the Mississippi guitarist and singer Tommy McClennan. Bob Dylan's track "Highway 51", released as the closing track of the first side of his debut album Bob Dylan on March 19, 1962, was based on McLennan's recording.

== Curtis Jones version ==
"Highway 51 Blues" is a song composed by American blues pianist Curtis Jones (1906–1971), whose song "Lonesome Bedroom Blues", released in 1937, had been popular. On January 25, 1938, "Highway 51 Blues", from his fourth recording session, was released on a 78 record. From 1941 to 1953, he did not record any further songs, and after a further seven years, in 1960 he recorded the album Trouble Blues. This was followed by Lonesome Bedroom Blues in 1962, released by Delmark Records, containing a new version of "Highway 51 Blues".

Authors Philippe Margotin and Jean-Michel Guesdon wrote that Highway 51, which extends from the suburbs of New Orleans, Louisiana, to Hurley, Wisconsin, "has a special place in the history of American Music" due to being the route used by many African-Americans moving to the north."

== Bob Dylan version ("Highway 51") ==
"Highway 51"

Song by Bob Dylan

from the album Bob Dylan
- Released: March 19, 1962
- Recorded: November 22, 1961
- Studio: Columbia 7th Ave, New York City
- Length: 2:49
- Label: Columbia
- Songwriters: Curtis Jones, Tommy McClennan
- Producer: John H. Hammond

=== Background and recording ===
American singer-songwriter Bob Dylan probably learned McClennan's version of "Highway 51" after hearing it either on a 78 record or from a reel to reel tape recording. "Highway 51" was recorded by Dylan at the second session for his debut album Bob Dylan. He recorded the song on one take at Columbia Studio A, 799 Seventh Avenue, New York City, on November 22, 1961. Dylan sings, and plays guitar and harmonica on the song. The album was produced by John H. Hammond, and engineered by George Knuerr and Pete Dauria.

Though McClennan was his source, on the label of the long-playing record issued in 1962, the song is credited to "C. Jones" (Curtis Jones). (It was common for credits to be assigned on the basis of a title, without checking the actual recording, and if Dylan learned the song from a tape, it is very possible that he did not know the name of its original performer.) Dylan used lyrics and vocal phrasing from McClennan's recording and a repeating guitar figure from "Wake Up Little Susie" by The Everly Brothers (1957). Dylan's official website has credited the song to "C. White". Dylan sings, and plays guitar and harmonica on the song. The album was produced by John H. Hammond, and engineered by George Knuerr and Pete Dauria. Bob Dylan was released by Columbia on March 19, 1962, with "Highway 51" as the closing track on side one. According to music scholar Steven Rings, by including chord progressions not found in either the Jones or McClennan versions, Dylan created "an articulation between the pop and rockabilly world of the Everlys and the rural blues of the song’s textual sources", which continued into Dylan's "It's Alright, Ma (I'm Only Bleeding)".

The narrator of the song says he will not travel on Highway 51 as, he says, it "runs right by my baby's door". He also says that if he should die early, he wants to be buried on the highway.

Dylan biographer Robert Shelton suggested that, despite the lack of electric instruments, the song can be regarded as "the first folk-rock recording". Paul Williams felt that "Highway 51" was one of several songs on the album to "give hints of Dylan's rock and roll sensibilities". The album's liner notes by "Stacey Williams" (a pseudonym for Shelton), say: "A diesel-tempoed "Highway 51" is of a type sung by the Everly Brothers, partially rewritten by Dylan. His guitar is tuned to an open tuning and features a particularly compelling vamping figure.".

Dylan gave a performance at Eve and Mac Mackenzie's home in New York in December 1961. He has performed the song in public at concerts only twice: at Carnegie Hall on September 22, 1962, and at New York Town Hall on April 12, 1963.

=== Reception ===
According to Michael Gray in The Bob Dylan Encyclopedia, Bob Dylan was an album "few people liked and that didn't sell", and led to Columbia seeking to drop Dylan. However, Gray gives a positive assessment, arguing that the "speed, energy and attack" of Dylan's vocal and instrumental performances "show how fresh and excellently 'unprofessional he was".

Neil Spencer gave the song a rating of 3/5 stars in an Uncut magazine Dylan supplement in 2015, writing that all the songs on Bob Dylan "were treated to a lot of yelping, stuttering harmonica and none too special guitar playing". Author John Nogowski rated the song as "C+". Shelton wrote about the song in his biography, No Direction Home, The Life and Music of Bob Dylan:

The simple guitar work supplies the equivalent of a full rhythm section, with interweaving stresses that suggest jazz drumming. Dylan is foreshadowing some of the exciting guitar work of Richie Havens, who used the flat-picking brushstroke so inventively ... Against [his] chugging guitar, Dylan delivers a vocally strong blues-rockabilly song. The pulse, tempo, and motion build up into several strong climaxes within two minutes, forty-nine seconds. Death is in the lyrics, but over-abundant life is in the voice and guitar.
