= Like a Rolling Stone =

1965 single by Bob Dylan

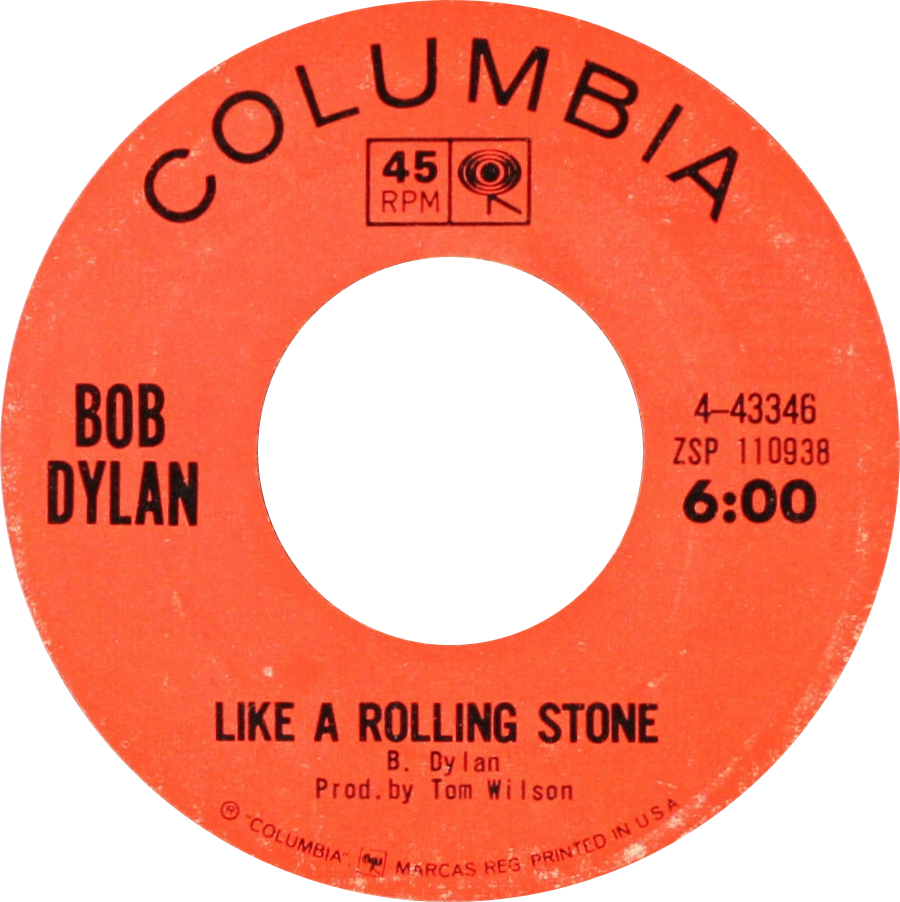
- Side A of retail US single

Single by Bob Dylan

from the album Highway 61 Revisited
- B-side: "Gates of Eden"
- Released: July 20, 1965
- Recorded: June 16, 1965
- Studio: Columbia 7th Ave, New York City
- Genre: Folk rock
- Length: 6:13
- Label: Columbia
- Songwriter: Bob Dylan
- Producer: Tom Wilson

Bob Dylan singles chronology
"Maggie's Farm" (1965)	"Like a Rolling Stone" (1965)	"Positively 4th Street" (1965)

Audio sample
- file; help

"Like a Rolling Stone" is a song by the American singer-songwriter Bob Dylan, released on July 20, 1965 by Columbia Records. Its confrontational lyrics originated in an extended verse Dylan wrote in June 1965, when he returned exhausted from a grueling tour of England. Dylan distilled this draft into four verses and a chorus. He recorded "Like a Rolling Stone" a few weeks later as the opening track of his sixth studio album, Highway 61 Revisited. During a difficult two-day preproduction, Dylan struggled to find the essence of the song, which was demoed without success in 3/4 time. A breakthrough happened when he recorded it in a rock format and the rookie session musician Al Kooper improvised a Hammond organ riff.

Columbia Records, unhappy with the song's six-minute length and electric sound, hesitated to release it. A month later, a copy of "Like a Rolling Stone" leaked to a popular new music club, and influential DJs encountered it. It was then released as a single. Although many radio stations initially refused to play such a long track, "Like a Rolling Stone" reached No. 2 in the US Billboard charts (No. 1 in Cashbox) and became a worldwide hit.

Critics described "Like a Rolling Stone" as revolutionary in its combination of musical elements; the youthful, cynical sound of Dylan's voice; and the directness of the question "How does it feel?" The song completed the transformation of Dylan's image from folk singer to rock star. It is considered one of the most influential compositions in postwar popular music. Rolling Stone listed it at No. 1 on their 2004 and 2010 "500 Greatest Songs of All Time" lists. It has been covered by the Jimi Hendrix Experience. At an auction in 2014, Dylan's handwritten lyrics fetched $2 million, a record for a popular music manuscript.

== Writing ==
In early 1965, after returning from the tour of England documented in the film Dont Look Back, Dylan was unhappy with the public's expectations of him and the direction his career was taking. He considered quitting the music business. In a 1966 Playboy interview, he said:

Last spring, I guess I was going to quit singing. I was very drained, and the way things were going, it was a very draggy situation ... But 'Like a Rolling Stone' changed it all. I mean it was something that I myself could dig. It's very tiring having other people tell you how much they dig you if you yourself don't dig you.

The song grew out of an extended piece of verse. In 1966, Dylan described its genesis to journalist Jules Siegel:

It was ten pages long. It wasn't called anything, just a rhythm thing on paper all about my steady hatred directed at some point that was honest. In the end it wasn't hatred, it was telling someone something they didn't know, telling them they were lucky. Revenge, that's a better word. I had never thought of it as a song, until one day I was at the piano, and on the paper it was singing, "How does it feel?" in a slow motion pace, in the utmost of slow motion following something. It was like swimming in lava.

During 1965, Dylan composed prose, poems, and songs by typing incessantly. Footage in Dont Look Back of Dylan in his suite at London's Savoy Hotel captures this process. However, Dylan told two interviewers that "Like a Rolling Stone" began as a long piece of "vomit" (10 pages long according to one account, 20 according to another) that later acquired musical form. Dylan has never publicly spoken of writing any other major composition in this way. In a 1966 interview with CBC Radio in Montreal, Dylan called the creation of the song a "breakthrough", explaining that it changed his perception of where he was going in his career. He said that he found himself writing

this long piece of vomit, 20 pages long, and out of it I took 'Like a Rolling Stone' and made it as a single. And I'd never written anything like that before and it suddenly came to me that was what I should do ... After writing that I wasn't interested in writing a novel, or a play. I just had too much, I want to write songs.

From the extended version on paper, Dylan crafted four verses and the chorus in Woodstock, New York. In 2014, when the handwritten lyrics were put up for auction, the four-page manuscript revealed that the full refrain of the chorus does not appear until the fourth page. A rejected third line, "like a dog without a bone" gives way to "now you're unknown". Earlier, Dylan had considered working the name Al Capone into the rhyme scheme, and he attempted to construct a rhyme scheme for "how does it feel?", penciling in "it feels real", "does it feel real", "shut up and deal", "get down and kneel" and "raw deal". The song was written on an upright piano in the key of D flat and was changed to C on the guitar in the recording studio.

== Recording ==
Dylan invited Chicago blues guitarist Mike Bloomfield to his Woodstock home for the weekend to learn new material. Bloomfield recalled, "The first thing I heard was 'Like a Rolling Stone'. I figured he wanted blues, string bending, because that's what I do. He said, 'Hey, man, I don't want any of that B.B. King stuff'. So, OK, I really fell apart. What the heck does he want? We messed around with the song. I played the way that he dug, and he said it was groovy."

The recording sessions were held on June 15–16, 1965, in Studio A of Columbia Records at 799 Seventh Avenue in New York City. Just five months had passed since Dylan had recorded his previous album, Bringing It All Back Home, with Tom Wilson as producer and Paul Griffin on piano, Bobby Gregg on drums, and Bruce Langhorne on tambourine. For the new album, Wilson recruited Griffin, Gregg, and Langhorne, and added Joe Macho Jr. on bass.

"Like a Rolling Stone", 3/4 version
The 3/4 "waltz" version of "Like a Rolling Stone", recorded on June 15. This take later appeared on The Bootleg Series Volumes 1–3 (Rare & Unreleased) 1961–1991.

In the first session, on June 15, five takes of the song were recorded in a markedly different style (3/4 waltz time, with Dylan on piano) from the eventual release. The lack of sheet music meant the song had to be played by ear. However, its essence was discovered in the course of the chaotic session. The musicians did not reach the first chorus until the fourth take, but after the following harmonica fill Dylan interrupted, saying, "My voice is gone, man. You wanna try it again?" The session ended shortly afterward. The take was released on the 1991 compilation The Bootleg Series Volumes 1–3 (Rare & Unreleased) 1961–1991.

When the musicians reconvened the following day, June 16, Al Kooper joined the proceedings. The 21-year-old session guitarist was Wilson's guest; he was not supposed to play. But when Wilson stepped out, Kooper sat down with his guitar with the other musicians, hoping to take part in recording. By the time Wilson returned, Kooper, who had been intimidated by Bloomfield's guitar playing, was back in the control room. After a couple of rehearsal takes, Kooper told Wilson he had a good part for the Hammond organ. Wilson belittled Kooper's organ skills, but did not forbid him to play. As Kooper later put it, "He just sort of scoffed at me ... He didn't say 'no'—so I went out there." Wilson was surprised to see Kooper at the organ but allowed him to play on the track. When Dylan heard a playback of the song, he insisted that the organ be turned up in the mix, despite Wilson's protest that Kooper was "not an organ player".

There were 15 recorded takes on June 16. By now the song had evolved into its familiar form, in 4/4 time with Dylan on electric guitar. After the fourth take—the master take that was released as a single—Wilson happily commented, "That sounds good to me." Despite this, Dylan and the band recorded the song 11 more times. It was the last song Wilson produced for Dylan.

The complete recording sessions that produced "Like a Rolling Stone", including all 20 takes and the individual "stems" that comprise the four-track master, were released in November 2015 on the 6-disc and 18-disc versions of The Bootleg Series Vol. 12: The Cutting Edge 1965–1966.

== Themes ==
Unlike conventional chart hits of the time, "Like a Rolling Stone" featured lyrics that were interpreted as expressions of resentment rather than love. Author Oliver Trager characterizes the lyrics as "Dylan's sneer at a woman who has fallen from grace and is reduced to fending for herself in a hostile, unfamiliar world". The song's subject, "Miss Lonely", previously opted for easy options in life—she attended the finest schools and enjoyed high-placed friends—but now that her situation has become difficult, it appears that she has no meaningful experiences to define her character. The opening lines of the song establish the character's former condition:

Once upon a time you dressed so fine
Threw the bums a dime in your prime, didn't you?

And the first verse ends with lines that seemingly deride her current condition:

Now you don't talk so loud
Now you don't seem so proud
About having to be scrounging your next meal

Despite the obvious vitriol, the song's narrator also seems to show compassion for Miss Lonely, and expresses joy for her in the freedom in losing everything. Jann Wenner commented: "Everything has been stripped away. You're on your own, you're free now ... You're so helpless and now you've got nothing left. And you're invisible—you've got no secrets—that's so liberating. You've nothing to fear anymore." The final verse ends with the lines:

When you ain't got nothing, you got nothing to lose
You're invisible now, you got no secrets to conceal

The refrain seems to emphasize these themes:

How does it feel
How does it feel
To be on your own
With no direction home
Like a complete unknown
Like a rolling stone

Dylan biographer Robert Shelton gave this interpretation:

A song that seems to hail the dropout life for those who can take it segues into compassion for those who have dropped out of bourgeois surroundings. 'Rolling Stone' is about the loss of innocence and the harshness of experience. Myths, props, and old beliefs fall away to reveal a very taxing reality.

Dylan humorously commented on the song's moral perspective at a press conference at KQED television studio on December 3, 1965. When a reporter, suggesting that the song adopted a harsh perspective on a girl, asked Dylan, "Are you hard on [people in your songs] because you want to torment them? Or to change their lives and make them know themselves?", Dylan replied while laughing, "I want to needle them."

Commentators attempted to tie the characters in the song to specific people in Dylan's personal life in 1965. In his book POPism: The Warhol '60s, Andy Warhol recalled that some people in his circle believed that "Like a Rolling Stone" contained hostile references to him; he was told, "Listen to 'Like a Rolling Stone'—I think you're the diplomat on the chrome horse, man." The reason behind Dylan's alleged hostility to Warhol was supposedly Warhol's treatment of actress and model Edie Sedgwick. It has been suggested that Sedgwick is the basis of the Miss Lonely character. Sedgwick was briefly involved with Dylan in late 1965 and early 1966, around which time there was some discussion of the two making a movie together. According to Warhol's collaborator Paul Morrissey, Sedgwick may have been in love with Dylan, and was shocked when she found out that Dylan had secretly married Sara Lownds in November 1965. However, in The Bob Dylan Encyclopedia, Michael Gray argues that Sedgwick had no connection with "Like a Rolling Stone", but states "there's no doubt that the ghost of Edie Sedgwick hangs around Blonde on Blonde".

Greil Marcus alluded to a suggestion by art historian Thomas E. Crow that Dylan had written the song as a comment on Warhol's scene:

I heard a lecture by Thomas Crow ... about "Like a Rolling Stone" being about Edie Sedgwick within Andy Warhol's circle, as something that Dylan saw from the outside, not being personally involved with either of them, but as something he saw and was scared by and saw disaster looming and wrote a song as a warning, and it was compelling.

Joan Baez, Marianne Faithfull and Bob Neuwirth have also been suggested as possible targets of Dylan's scorn. Dylan biographer Howard Sounes warned against reducing the song to the biography of one person, and suggested "it is more likely that the song was aimed generally at those [Dylan] perceived as being 'phony'". Sounes adds, "There is some irony in the fact that one of the most famous songs of the folk-rock era—an era associated primarily with ideals of peace and harmony—is one of vengeance."

Mike Marqusee has written at length on the conflicts in Dylan's life during this time, with its deepening alienation from his old folk-revival audience and clear-cut leftist causes. He suggests that the song is probably self-referential: "The song only attains full poignancy when one realises it is sung, at least in part, to the singer himself: he's the one 'with no direction home.'" Dylan himself has noted that, after his motorcycle accident in 1966, he realized that "when I used words like 'he' and 'it' and 'they,' and talking about other people, I was really talking about nobody but me."

The song is also notable for the amazing characters who surround the heroine. Andy Gill recalls the strangeness contained in the lyrics: "Who, fascinated fans debated, was Miss Lonely, Napoleon in rags and—most bizarre of all—the diplomat who rode a chrome horse while balancing a Siamese cat upon his shoulder? What on earth was going on here?" The diplomat in question, in the third verse:

You used to ride on the chrome horse with your diplomat
Who carried on his shoulder a Siamese cat
Ain't it hard when you discover that
He really wasn't where it's at
After he took from you everything he could steal

One interpretation was formulated in Jean-Michel Buizard's 2021 book Like a Rolling Stone Revisited: Une relecture de Dylan (French for A Re-reading of Dylan), which sheds new light on the possible identity of Miss Lonely and company. The central idea is that in 1965, the young Dylan remained secretly haunted by the country blues, which formed the framework of his first album (Bob Dylan, 1962) and of which he would say in 2004 in his Chronicles: "it was a counterpart of myself". The song is then conceived as a half-historical half-imaginary tale in which the old blues, once sovereign in the Southern countryside, surrounded by its servants, the bluesmen, finds itself alone and abandoned in the 1940s, when these same bluesmen, following the great wave of migration of the black population, left for the cities of the North and founded there a modern blues, electrified and emptied of its roots. Miss Lonely is thus "an allegory of country blues".

Muddy Waters, author of the 1950 blues songs entitled "Rollin' Stone", is an example of this history. He is the one we find as a "diplomat" shouldering his guitar (the "Siamese cat") on the train (the "chrome horse") that took him to Chicago in 1943, where he transformed the blues of his childhood into the city blues that made him famous ("he took from you everything he could steal"). Other notable bluesmen appear in the song: presumably Blind Lemon Jefferson as "the mystery tramp" in the second verse and Robert Johnson, "Napoleon in rags", in the final one.

== Release ==
According to Shaun Considine, release coordinator for Columbia Records in 1965, "Like a Rolling Stone" was first relegated to the "graveyard of canceled releases" because of concerns from the sales and marketing departments over its unprecedented six-minute length and "raucous" rock sound. In the days following the rejection, Considine took a discarded acetate of the song to the New York club Arthur—a newly opened disco popular with celebrities and the media—and asked a DJ to play it. At the crowd's insistence, the demo was played repeatedly, until finally it wore out. The next morning, a disc jockey and a programming director from the city's leading top 40 stations called Columbia and demanded copies. Shortly afterward, on July 20, 1965, "Like a Rolling Stone" was released as a single with "Gates of Eden" as its B-side.

Despite its length, the song is Dylan's most commercially successful release, remaining in the US charts for 12 weeks, where it reached number 2. The song that held it from the top spot was the Beatles' "Help!" The promotional copies released to disc jockeys on July 15 had the first two verses and two refrains on one side of the disk, and the remainder of the song on the other. DJs wishing to play the entire song would simply flip the vinyl over. While many radio stations were reluctant to play "Like a Rolling Stone" in its entirety, public demand eventually forced them to air it in full. This helped the single reach its number 2 peak, several weeks after its release. It was a Top 10 hit in other countries, including Canada, Ireland, the Netherlands, and the UK.

In its contemporary review, Cash Box described "Like a Rolling Stone" as a "funky, rhythmic ode which proclaims the artist's philosophy of rugged individualism".

Besides appearing on Highway 61 Revisited, the song's standard release can be found on the compilations Bob Dylan's Greatest Hits, Biograph, The Best of Bob Dylan (1997), The Essential Bob Dylan, The Best of Bob Dylan (2005), and Dylan. The mono version appears on The Original Mono Recordings. In addition, the early, incomplete studio recording in 3/4 time appears on The Bootleg Series Vol. 2.

== Music video ==
In November 2013, forty-eight years after the release of the song, Dylan's website released an official music video for "Like a Rolling Stone". Created by the digital agency Interlude, the video is interactive, allowing viewers to use their keyboards to flip through 16 channels that imitate TV formats, including game shows, shopping networks and reality series. People on each channel appear to lip-sync the song's lyrics. Video director Vania Heymann stated, "I'm using the medium of television to look back right at us – you're flipping yourself to death with switching channels [in real life]." The video contains an hour and 15 minutes' worth of content in all and features appearances from comedians Marc Maron, Carly Aquilino, Jessimae Peluso, and Nicole Byer, rapper Danny Brown, The Price Is Right host Drew Carey, SportsCenter anchor Steve Levy, TV personality Nessa, Jonathan and Drew Scott of Property Brothers, and Pawn Stars cast members Rick Harrison and Austin "Chumlee" Russell. The video was released to publicize the release of a 35-album box set, Bob Dylan: The Complete Album Collection Vol. One, containing Dylan's 35 official studio albums and 11 live albums. The Guinness Book of World Records recorded it as the longest wait for an official music video.

== Live performances ==
Dylan performed the song live for the first time within days of its release, when he appeared at the Newport Folk Festival on July 25, 1965, in Newport, Rhode Island. Many of the audience's folk enthusiasts objected to Dylan's use of electric guitars, looking down on rock 'n roll, as Bloomfield put it, as popular amongst "greasers, heads, dancers, people who got drunk and boogied". According to Dylan's friend, music critic Paul Nelson, "The audience [was] booing and yelling 'Get rid of the electric guitar'", while Dylan and his backing musicians gave an uncertain rendition of their new single. Al Kooper, who offers a different version of the crowd's reaction, claims that it was due to the length of the set they had just played, being only 15 minutes while other artists had done 45-minute sets.

Highway 61 Revisited was issued at the end of August 1965. When Dylan went on tour that fall he asked the future members of The Band to accompany him in performing the electric half of the concerts. "Like a Rolling Stone" took the closing slot on his setlist and held it, with rare exceptions, through the end of his 1966 "world tour". On May 17, 1966, during the last leg of the tour, Dylan and his band performed at Free Trade Hall in Manchester, England. Just before they started to play the track, an audience member yelled "Judas!", apparently referring to Dylan's supposed "betrayal" of folk music. Dylan responded, "I don't believe you... You're a liar!" With that, he turned to the band, ordering them to "play it fucking loud!" (Note: Mickey Jones—the drummer for that part of the tour—maintains that it was not Dylan who said to "play it fucking loud", but most likely a member of their British road crew. Jones argues that in footage of the performance, the movement of Dylan's lips does not match the utterance, and that the words were spoken in a British accent (see Jones, Mickey in Down in the Flood).)

Since then, "Like a Rolling Stone" has remained a staple in Dylan's concerts, often with revised arrangements. It was included in his 1969 Isle of Wight show and in both his reunion tour with The Band in 1974 and the Rolling Thunder Revue tour in 1975–76. The song continued to be featured in other tours throughout the 1970s and 1980s. According to Dylan's official website, he performed the song live over 2,000 times, as of 2019.

Live performances of the song are included on Self Portrait (recorded at the Isle of Wight, August 31, 1969), Before the Flood (recorded February 13, 1974), Bob Dylan at Budokan (recorded March 1, 1978), MTV Unplugged (recorded November 18, 1994), The Bootleg Series Vol. 4: Bob Dylan Live 1966, The "Royal Albert Hall" Concert (recorded in Manchester, UK, May 17, 1966; same recording also available on The Bootleg Series Vol. 7: No Direction Home: The Soundtrack), The Band's 2001 reissue of Rock of Ages (recorded January 1, 1972), and The Bootleg Series Vol. 13: Trouble No More 1979–1981 (Deluxe Edition) (recorded June 27, 1981). In 2016, all Dylan's recorded live performances of the song from 1966 were released in the boxed set The 1966 Live Recordings, with the May 26, 1966 Royal Albert Hall performance released separately on the album The Real Royal Albert Hall 1966 Concert.

The July 1965 Newport performance of the song is included in Murray Lerner's film The Other Side of the Mirror, while a May 21, 1966, performance in Newcastle, England, is featured in Martin Scorsese's documentary No Direction Home, along with footage of the above-mentioned May 17 heckling incident.

At the 1988 Rock and Roll Hall of Fame induction ceremony, Dylan performed "Like a Rolling Stone" and "Satisfaction" with Mick Jagger and about 30 other people. In 1998, Dylan performed the song with the Rolling Stones, after opening for them at a concert in Brazil; Jagger introduced the song by saying Dylan had written it for them. Jagger repeated the claim during a 2024 Stones concert in Las Vegas.

== Legacy ==
The song's sound has been described as revolutionary in its combination of electric guitar licks, organ chords, and Dylan's voice, at once young and jeeringly cynical. Critic Michael Gray described the track as "a chaotic amalgam of blues, impressionism, allegory, and an intense directness in the central chorus: 'How does it feel'". The song had an enormous impact on popular culture and rock music. Its success made Dylan a pop icon, as Paul Williams notes:

Dylan had been famous, had been the center of attention, for a long time. But now the ante was being upped again. He'd become a pop star as well as a folk star ... and was, even more than the Beatles, a public symbol of the vast cultural, political, generational changes taking place in the United States and Europe. He was perceived as, and in many ways functioned as, a leader.

Paul Rothchild, producer of the Doors' first five albums, recalled the elation that an American musician had made a record that successfully challenged the primacy of the British Invasion groups. He said,

What I realized when I was sitting there is that one of US—one of the so-called Village hipsters—was making music that could compete with THEM—the Beatles, and the Stones, and the Dave Clark Five—without sacrificing any of the integrity of folk music or the power of rock'n'roll.

The song had a huge impact on Bruce Springsteen, who was 15 years old when he first heard it. Springsteen described the moment during his speech inducting Dylan into the Rock and Roll Hall of Fame in 1988 and also assessed the long-term significance of "Like a Rolling Stone":

The first time I heard Bob Dylan, I was in the car with my mother listening to WMCA, and on came that snare shot that sounded like somebody'd kicked open the door to your mind ... The way that Elvis freed your body, Dylan freed your mind, and showed us that because the music was physical did not mean it was anti-intellect. He had the vision and talent to make a pop song so that it contained the whole world. He invented a new way a pop singer could sound, broke through the limitations of what a recording could achieve, and he changed the face of rock'n'roll for ever and ever.

Dylan's contemporaries in 1965 were both startled and challenged by the single. Paul McCartney remembered going around to John Lennon's house in Weybridge to hear the song. According to McCartney, "It seemed to go on and on forever. It was just beautiful ... He showed all of us that it was possible to go a little further." Frank Zappa had a more extreme reaction: "When I heard 'Like a Rolling Stone', I wanted to quit the music business, because I felt: 'If this wins and it does what it's supposed to do, I don't need to do anything else ...' But it didn't do anything. It sold but nobody responded to it in the way that they should have." Nearly forty years later, in 2003, Elvis Costello commented on the innovative quality of the single. "What a shocking thing to live in a world where there was Manfred Mann and the Supremes and Engelbert Humperdinck and here comes 'Like a Rolling Stone'".

Although CBS tried to make the record more "radio friendly" by cutting it in half and spreading it over both sides of the vinyl, both Dylan and fans demanded that the full duration of the recording should be placed on one side and that radio stations play the song in its entirety. The success of "Like a Rolling Stone" was influential in changing the music business convention regarding the length of singles, whereby they were restricted to durations of less than three minutes. In the words of the magazine Rolling Stone, which took its name from the song and the 1950s blues song "Rollin' Stone", "No other pop song has so thoroughly challenged and transformed the commercial laws and artistic conventions of its time, for all time." Richard Austin, of Sotheby's auction house, said: "Before the release of Like a Rolling Stone, music charts were overrun with short and sweet love songs, many clocking in at three minutes or less. By defying convention with six and a half minutes of dark, brooding poetry, Dylan rewrote the rules for pop music."

In 1966, Dylan told Ralph Gleason: "Rolling Stone's the best song I wrote." In 2004, speaking to Robert Hilburn, Dylan still felt that the song had a special place in his work: "It's like a ghost is writing a song like that, it gives you the song and it goes away. You don't know what it means. Except that the ghost picked me to write the song."

More than 50 years since its release, "Like a Rolling Stone" remains highly regarded among commentators. James Gerard, writing for AllMusic, characterized the song as "one of the most self-righteous and eloquent indictments ever committed to wax", and declared it significant for beginning a new phase in Dylan's career as a songwriter and performer.

"Like a Rolling Stone" generally ranks highly in polls of the greatest songs ever written, measured by reviewers and fellow songwriters. A 2002 ranking by Uncut and a 2005 poll in Mojo both rated it as Dylan's number one song. As for his personal views on such polls, Dylan told Ed Bradley in a 2004 interview on 60 Minutes that he never pays attention to them, because they change frequently. Dylan's point was illustrated in the "100 Greatest Songs of All Time poll" by Mojo in 2000, which included two Dylan singles, but not "Like a Rolling Stone". Five years later, the magazine named it his number one song. Rolling Stone picked "Like a Rolling Stone" as the number two single of the past 25 years in 1989, and then in 2004 placed the song at number one on its list of the "500 Greatest Songs of All Time". In 2010, Rolling Stone again placed "Like a Rolling Stone" at the top of their list of "500 Greatest Songs Of All Time". Rolling Stone then re-ranked it at number 4 in their 2021 "500 Greatest Songs of All Time" list. In 2006, Pitchfork Media placed it at number 4 on its list of "200 Greatest Songs of the 1960s". In 2020, The Guardian and GQ ranked the song number one and number two, respectively, on their lists of the 50 greatest Bob Dylan songs.

On June 24, 2014, Sotheby's sold Dylan's original hand-written lyrics of "Like a Rolling Stone" at a New York auction devoted to rock memorabilia. The lyrics were sold for $2 million, a record price for a popular music manuscript. In June 2026, CBS News included the song in its list of the 250 essential American songs of the past 250 years.

== Accolades ==
Accolades for "Like a Rolling Stone"
List	Publisher	Rank	Year of publication
500 Greatest Songs of All Time	Rolling Stone	1	2010, 2004
500 Greatest Songs of All Time	Rolling Stone	4	2021
200 Greatest Songs of the 1960s	Pitchfork Media	4	2006
100 Greatest Rock Songs	VH1	4	2000
500 Songs That Shaped Rock	Rock & Roll Hall of Fame		1995
The 100 Greatest Songs of All Time	Consequence of Sound	3	2012
The 1001 Greatest Singles Ever Made	Dave Marsh	7	1989
The 40 Most Influential Records of the 20th Century	Gary Pig Gold		1999

== Personnel ==
According to the Dylan researcher Olof Björner, except where noted:

- Bob Dylan – vocals, guitar, harmonica
- Mike Bloomfield – guitar
- Bobby Gregg – drums
- Paul Griffin – piano
- Al Kooper – organ
- Bruce Langhorne – tambourine
- Joe Macho Jr. – bass guitar

== Jimi Hendrix Experience versions ==
"Like a Rolling Stone" performed by the Jimi Hendrix Experience at the Monterey Pop Festival
29 second sample

During the earlier part of his career with the Jimi Hendrix Experience, guitarist Jimi Hendrix occasionally performed "Like a Rolling Stone" in concert. Hendrix was an admirer of Bob Dylan, and especially liked "Like a Rolling Stone"; "It made me feel that I wasn't the only one who'd ever felt so low", Hendrix explained.

A live recording from the 1967 Monterey Pop Festival is the best known version and was first released in 1970 on the split album with Otis Redding Historic Performances Recorded at the Monterey International Pop Festival. Music critic Greil Marcus described the atmosphere of the Hendrix recording as "Huge chords ride over the beginning of each verse like rain clouds; the tune is taken very slowly, with Hendrix's thick, street-talk drawl sounding nothing at all like Dylan's Midwestern dust storm." The Experience's performance has been re-released several times, including on Jimi Plays Monterey (1986) and Live at Monterey (2007) albums and associated DVDs.

== Chart performance ==
=== Weekly charts ===
1965 weekly chart performance for "Like a Rolling Stone"
Chart (1965)	Peak position
Australia (Kent Music Report)	7
Belgium (Ultratop)	13
Canada (CHUM Hit Parade)	2
Canada (RPM) Top Singles	3
Finland (Suomen virallinen lista)	18
Ireland (IRMA)	9
Netherlands (Dutch Top 40)	7
Netherlands (Single Top 100)	7
Sweden (Kvällstoppen)	9
UK Record Retailer Chart	4
US Billboard Hot 100	2
US Cash Box Top 100	1
West German Media Control Singles Chart	13

2016 weekly chart performance for "Like a Rolling Stone"
Chart (2016)	Peak position
Sweden Heatseeker (Sverigetopplistan)	18

=== Year-end charts ===
Annual chart performance for "Like a Rolling Stone"
Chart (1965)	Position
US Billboard Hot 100	41
US Cash Box Top 100	38

== Certifications ==
Certifications for "Like a Rolling Stone"
Region	Certification	Certified units/sales
Italy (FIMI)	Gold	25,000^{‡}
Mexico (AMPROFON)	Platinum+Gold	90,000^{‡}
New Zealand (RMNZ)	Platinum	30,000^{‡}
Spain (Promusicae)	Platinum	60,000^{‡}
United Kingdom (BPI) sales since 2005	Platinum	600,000^{‡}
United States (RIAA)	3× Platinum	3,000,000^{‡}
^{‡} Sales+streaming figures based on certification alone.

== Bibliography ==
- Bauldie, John, ed. (1992). Wanted Man: In Search of Bob Dylan. Penguin Books. ISBN 0-14-015361-6.
- Buizard, Jean-Michel (2021). Like a Rolling Stone Revisited : Une relecture de Dylan (in French). Camion Blanc.
- Cott, Jonathan, ed. (2006). Dylan on Dylan: The Essential Interviews. Hodder & Stoughton. ISBN 0-340-92312-1.
- Creswell, Toby (2006). 1001 Songs: The Great Songs of All Time and the Artists, Stories and Secrets Behind Them. Thunder's Mouth Press. ISBN 1-56025-915-9.
- Dylan, Bob (2005). Chronicles: Volume One. Simon & Schuster.
- Gill, Andy (1998). Classic Bob Dylan 1962–69: My Back Pages. Carlton. ISBN 3-283-00358-0.
- Gilliland, John (1969). "Ballad in Plain D: An introduction to the Bob Dylan era" (audio). Pop Chronicles. University of North Texas Libraries.
- Gray, Michael (2006). The Bob Dylan Encyclopedia. Continuum International. ISBN 0-8264-6933-7.
- Heylin, Clinton (2003). Bob Dylan: Behind the Shades Revisited. Harper Collins. ISBN 0-06-052569-X.
- Heylin, Clinton (2009). Revolution in the Air: The Songs of Bob Dylan, 1957–1973. Chicago Review Press. ISBN 978-1-55652-843-9.
- Irwin, Colin (2008). Bob Dylan Highway 61 Revisited. Flame Tree Publishing. ISBN 978-0-8230-8398-5.
- Bob Dylan and the Band (2012). Down in the Flood ("Driving the Band – Mickey Jones & Tour '66" DVD bonus feature). New Malden, UK: Chrome Dreams.
- Krogsgaard, Michael (1991). Positively Bob Dylan. Popular Culture, Ink. ISBN 1-56075-000-6.
- Lawrence, Sharon (2005). Jimi Hendrix: The Man, the Magic, the Truth. Harper Collins. ISBN 0-06-056299-4.
- Marcus, Greil (April 11, 2005). "Greil Marcus on Recording 'Like a Rolling Stone'". NPR. Archived from the original on March 1, 2019.
- Marcus, Greil (May 13, 2005). "How does it feel?". The Guardian. Archived from the original on May 27, 2015.
- Marcus, Greil (2005). Like a Rolling Stone: Bob Dylan at the Crossroads. PublicAffairs. ISBN 1-58648-382-X. "greil marcus like a rolling stone."
- Marqusee, Mike (2003). Chimes of Freedom: The Politics of Bob Dylan's Art. The New Press. ISBN 1-56584-825-X.
- McGregor, Craig (1972). Bob Dylan: A Retrospective. William Morrow & Co. ISBN 0-688-06025-0.
- Polizzotti, Mark (2006). Highway 61 Revisited. A&C Black. ISBN 0-8264-1775-2.
- Shelton, Robert (1986). No Direction Home: The Life and Music of Bob Dylan. Ballantine. ISBN 0-345-34721-8.
- Sounes, Howard (2001). Down the Highway, The Life of Bob Dylan. Grove Press. ISBN 0-8021-1686-8.
- Stein, Jean (1992). Edie: An American Biography. Pimlico Books. ISBN 0-7126-5252-3.
- Trager, Oliver (2004). Keys to the Rain: The Definitive Bob Dylan Encyclopedia. Billboard Books. ISBN 0-8230-7974-0.
- Warhol, Andy (1980). POPism: The Warhol '60s. Harper & Row. ISBN 0-06-091062-3.
- Williams, Paul (1991). Bob Dylan: Performing Artist The Early Years 1960–1973. Underwood-Miller. ISBN 0-88733-131-9.
- Williamson, Nigel (2006). Bob Dylan: The Rough Guide (2nd ed.). Rough Guides. ISBN 1-84353-718-4.
