= U.S. Route 51 =

Numbered Highway in the United States

U.S. Route 51
- US 51 highlighted in red

Route information
- Length: 1,277 mi (2,055 km)
- Existed: November 11, 1926–present

Major junctions
- South end: US 61 in LaPlace, LA
- I-10 in LaPlace, LA; I-20 in Jackson, MS; I-40 / I-69 in Memphis, TN; I-57 at Cairo, IL; I-64 at Richview, IL; I-70 in Vandalia, IL; I-55 / I-74 in Bloomington, IL; I-80 in La Salle, IL; I-90 in Cherry Valley, IL; I-39 / I-90 / I-94 in DeForest, WI
- North end: US 2 near Hurley, WI

Location
- Country: United States
- States: Louisiana, Mississippi, Tennessee, Kentucky, Illinois, Wisconsin

Highway system
- United States Numbered Highway System; List; Special; Divided
← US 50	→ US 52

U.S. Route 51 or U.S. Highway 51 (US 51) is a major south–north United States highway that extends 1,277 miles (2,055 km) from the western suburbs of New Orleans, Louisiana, to within 150 feet (46 m) of the Wisconsin–Michigan state line. As most of the United States Numbered Highways ending with "1", it is a cross-country north–south route extending from the Gulf Coast region to the Great Lakes region. Much of the highway in northern Illinois and southern Wisconsin runs parallel to or is cosigned with Interstate 39 (I-39) and much of the route in several states also parallels the Illinois Central Railroad. From LaPlace, Louisiana, Mississippi, to Memphis, Tennessee, much of that portion of US 51 runs largely parallel or is concurrent with Interstate 55 (I-55). The highway's northern terminus is between Hurley, Wisconsin, and Ironwood, Michigan, where it ends with a roundabout at US 2. Its southern terminus is in Laplace, Louisiana, ending at US 61. US 51 is routed through the states of Louisiana, Mississippi, Tennessee, Kentucky, Illinois, and Wisconsin.

In addition to singing about US 61 on his album Highway 61 Revisited, musician Bob Dylan also commemorated US 51, covering the folk song "Highway 51 Blues", earlier recorded by both Curtis Jones and Tommy McClennan, on his eponymous album Bob Dylan. The North Mississippi Allstars also paid tribute to the highway in the title track of their album 51 Phantom.

In Memphis, Tennessee, all of US 51 south of South Parkway East was renamed from Bellevue Boulevard to Elvis Presley Boulevard on January 17, 1972. Graceland is located on this section of the highway, in the subdivision of Whitehaven.

In 2004, the six states that US 51 traverses banded together as the Explore Hwy 51 Coalition to help promote this "All-American Road". The group now offers visitor information for traveling the length of the road.

== Route description ==
=== Louisiana ===
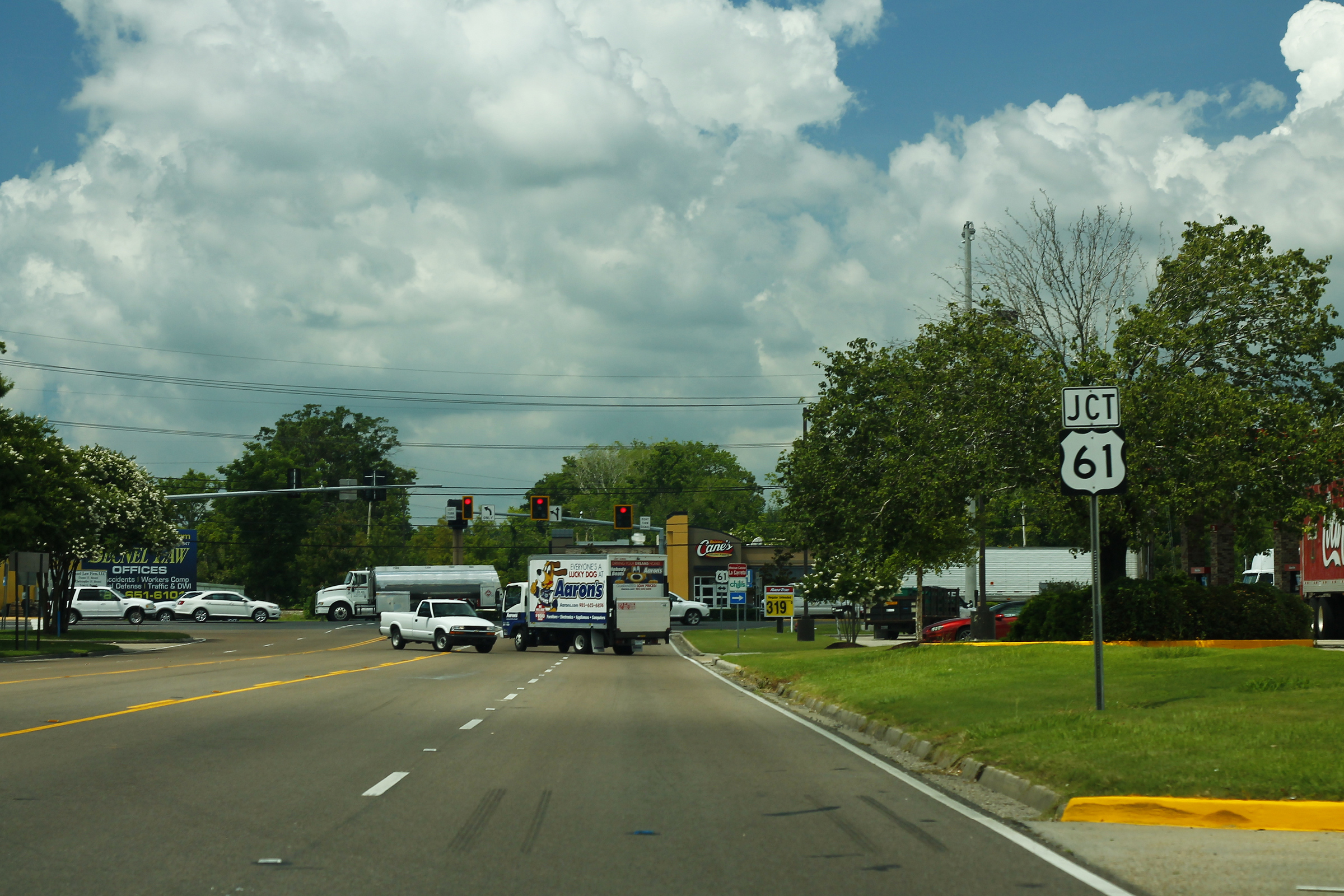
Southern terminus of US 51 at US 61, LaPlace

US 51 begins at the intersection with US 61 in Laplace and heads northeast. It intersects I-10 before running concurrently with I-55. Near the interchange with I-12, the route splits from I-55. It intersects US 190 in Hammond and remains running parallel with I-55 before entering Mississippi. In the 1930s, this highway was called Jefferson Davis Highway.

=== Mississippi ===
US 51 enters Mississippi from Louisiana in Osyka and runs parallel with I-55. It intersects US 98 in McComb and US 84 south of Brookhaven. Northwest of Crystal Springs, it runs concurrently with I-55 and then splits at the interchange with I-20 in Jackson. The highway then runs through Jackson, intersecting US 80. Outside Ridgeland, it passes under I-55 as it continues northeast. It continues through Canton, Pickens, Goodman, and Durant. The highway continues to run along I-55, intersecting US 82 in Winona and US 278 in Batesville. The route passes under I-69 before entering Tennessee.

The Mississippi section of US 51 is defined at Mississippi Code Annotated § 65-3-3.

=== Tennessee ===
US 51 enters Tennessee from Mississippi and travels through Memphis. It intersects I-55 and then I-240 before intersecting US 78. It then runs concurrently with US 79 before intersecting I-69. As it exits Memphis, it intersects I-40 and heads northeasterly. In Dyersburg, it runs concurrently with US 412 for a half a mile before intersecting I-155's eastern terminus. US 51 then continues northeasterly before entering Kentucky. US 51 between Memphis and Kentucky is planned on running concurrently with I-69.

=== Kentucky ===
US 51 enters Kentucky at Fulton, running concurrently with I-69 and continues northward through the towns of Clinton, Bardwell and Wickliffe to the Ohio River. The route intersects and runs concurrently with US 62 before separating from it in Cairo. Along the way it also intersects US 60. The route then enters Illinois before running concurrently with I-57.

=== Illinois ===
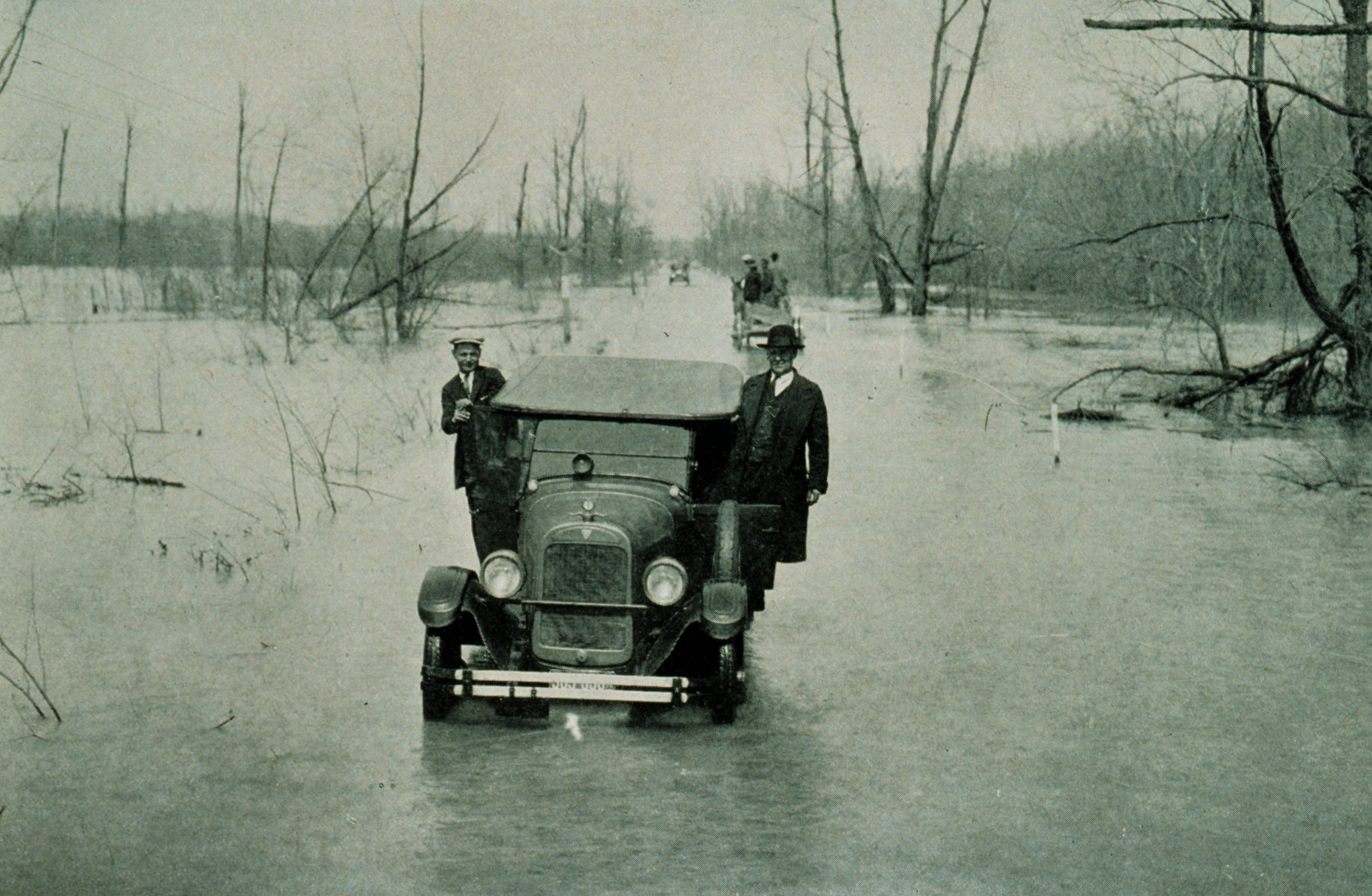
US 51 between Mounds and Cairo, during the Great Mississippi Flood of 1927

US 51 enters Illinois from Kentucky at the city of Cairo. The route heads northward to a village near Cairo called Mounds, and shares the pavement with I-57, following it for 24 miles (39 km) to Dongola, before splitting and heading north. The route remains two lanes from Dongola to just before Assumption with the exception of a 10-mile (16 km) section between Centralia and I-64.

North of Assumption, US 51 becomes an expressway to Decatur. In Decatur, US 51 follows I-72 to bypass town. US 51 leaves I-72 after eight miles (13 km), and heads north to Bloomington–Normal as an expressway. At Bloomington–Normal, US 51 follows I-74 for a mile, then I-55 for seven miles (11 km), before following I-39 for 140 miles (230 km).

US 51 follows I-39, intersecting I-80 and I-88 along the way. The highway also follows US 20 south of Rockford (while still following I-39). I-39/US 51 joins I-90, making US 51 one of the only toll roads in Illinois that is a U.S. Highway. US 51 exits I-39/I-90 just a mile south of the Wisconsin state line. US 51 follows Illinois Route 75 (IL 75) west to the intersection of IL 251, then turns north through South Beloit to enter Wisconsin.

=== Wisconsin ===
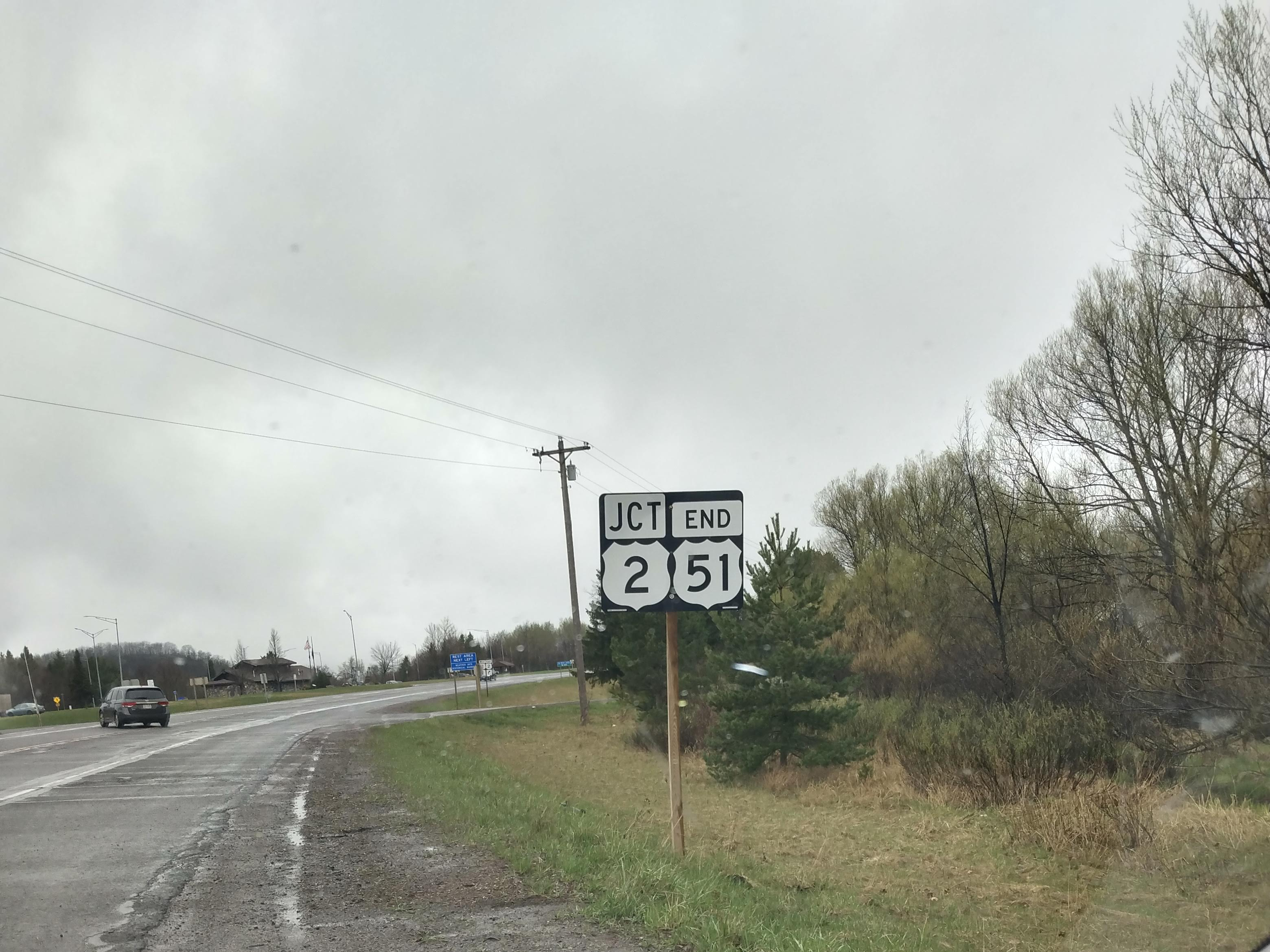
Northern terminus of US 51 at US 2 in Hurley, Wisconsin

In the state of Wisconsin, US 51 enters from Illinois at Beloit. US 51 splits off from I-39/I-90 in South Beloit, Illinois, and continues northward through Janesville and Edgerton. In Edgerton, US 51 rejoins I-39/I-90 for 3.5 miles (5.6 km) before splitting off towards Stoughton and McFarland. US 51 runs almost parallel to I-39/I-90 through the eastern portion of Madison, crosses the Interstate in DeForest, and finally rejoins I-39 again at Portage. US 51 runs concurrently with I-39 until I-39's terminus in Wausau and continues on as a mixture of freeway and expressway until just north of the interchange with US 8. From there through Hazelhurst, US 51 is a two-lane road with sporadic three-lane sections (which were constructed in 2008). US 51 expands to four lanes, with a central fifth turn lane from Hazelhurst to Arbor Vitae; north of Arbor Vitae it returns to two lanes and continues to its northern end in Hurley, where it terminates at US 2.

== Major intersections ==
Louisiana
US 61 in LaPlace
I-10 in LaPlace
I-55 northeast of LaPlace. The highways travel concurrently to Hammond.
US 190 in Hammond
Mississippi
US 98 in McComb
US 84 south of Brookhaven
I-55 in Crystal Springs. The highways travel concurrently to Jackson.
I-20 / US 49 in Jackson. The highways travel concurrently through the city.
US 80 in Jackson
US 82 in Winona
US 278 in Batesville
Tennessee
I-55 / Future I-69 in Memphis
US 78 in Memphis
US 64 / US 70 / US 72 / US 79 in Memphis. US 51/US 64/US 70/US 79 travels concurrently through the city.
I-240 in Memphis
I-40 in Memphis
Future I-69 in Memphis
Future I-269 in Millington
US 412 in Dyersburg. The highways travel concurrently through the city.
Future I-69 / I-155 / US 412 in Dyersburg. I-69/US 51 travels concurrently to southwest of Troy.
US 45W northeast of Union City. The highways travel concurrently to South Fulton.
US 45 / US 45E in South Fulton
Kentucky
I-69 in Fulton. The highways travel concurrently through the city.
US 62 in Bardwell. The highways travel concurrently to Cairo, Illinois.
US 60 in Wickliffe. The highways travel concurrently to Cairo, Illinois.
Illinois
I-57 in Cairo. The highways travel concurrently to near Dongola.
I-64 in Richview
US 50 in Sandoval. The highways travel concurrently through the village.
US 40 in Vandalia Township. The highways travel concurrently to Vandalia.
I-70 in Vandalia
US 36 in Harristown
I-72 in Harristown. The highways travel concurrently to Decatur.
I-74 in Bloomington Township. The highways travel concurrently to northwest of Normal.
I-55 in Bloomington. The highways travel concurrently to Normal.
US 150 in Bloomington
I-39 / I-55 in Normal. I-39/US 51 travels concurrently to South Beloit.
US 24 in El Paso
US 6 in LaSalle
I-80 in LaSalle
US 52 on the Troy Grove–Ophir township line
US 34 in Mendota Township
US 30 on the Amboy–Franklin Grove township line
I-88 in Dement Township
US 20 in Rockford. The highways travel concurrently to Cherry Valley.
I-90 in Cherry Valley. The highways travel concurrently to South Beloit.
Wisconsin
US 14 in the Town of Janesville
I-39 / I-90 in the Town of Albion. The highways travel concurrently through the town.
US 12 / US 18 in Madison
US 151 in Madison
I-39 / I-90 / I-94 in the Town of Burke
I-39 in the Town of Fort Winnebago. The highways travel concurrently to the Town of Rib Mountain.
US 10 in Stevens Point. The highways travel concurrently to the Town of Hull.
US 8 in the Town of King
US 2 in the Town of Kimball
