= Blues and Trouble =

Studio album by Curtis Jones
- Released: 1980
- Recorded: 1937, 1938, 1939, 1940, 1953
- Genre: Piano blues
- Label: Oldie Blues

Blues and Trouble is an album by American blues pianist Curtis Jones.

== Content ==
The album consists of early work of Jones recorded in Chicago from 1937 to 1940 and 1953. The album was released in 1980 on the Dutch record label Oldie Blues OL 2824. Linernotes by Martin van Olderen.

== Track listing ==
Side one

1. "Lonesome Bedroom Blues"
2. "You Got Good Business"
3. "Blues and Trouble"
4. "Little Jivin' Woman"
5. "My Baby's Getting Buggish"
6. "It's a Low Down Dirty Shame"
7. "Private Talk Blues"
8. "Heavy Hip Mama"

Side two

1. "Solid Jive"
2. "Love in a Loving Way"
3. "Gold Digger Blues"
4. "Sugar Bowl Blues"
5. "Wrong Blues"
6. "Cool Playing Blues"
7. "Flaming Blues"
8. "Upside Down Blues"

== Personnel ==
- Curtis Jones – piano, vocals on all tracks
- Wille Bee (James) – guitar on side A 1–5
- Fred Williams – drums on side A 1–2, 7–8, side B 1–4
- George Gant – sax on side A 6
- Hobson 'Hot Box' Johnson – electric guitar on side A 6–8
- Lorenzo King – tenor sax on side B 5–8
- L. C. McKinley – guitar on side B 5–8
- Alfred Elkins – bass on side B 5–8
- Judge Riley – drums on side B 5–8
