= Olof Björner =

Swedish writer (1942–2023)

Olof Björner (26 November 1942 – 12 September 2023) was a Swedish researcher who specialised in documenting the live performances and recording sessions of the American singer-songwriter Bob Dylan. In addition to operating bjorner.com, a website featuring detailed listings of Dylan's live concerts and studio recordings from 1956 to 2020, Björner authored a 13-volume set on these subjects, called Olof's Files: A Bob Dylan Performance Guide, issued by UK publisher Hardinge Simpole.

Commenting on the quality of Björner's publications and his website, Dylan critic Michael Gray has written, "The detail is extraordinary, and the level of accuracy phenomenal."

== Biography ==
Björner was born in Stockholm in 1942, and obtained a computer science degree in 1967. He first worked as a computer consultant and later became a management consultant specializing in internet technology strategies for the healthcare industry. In 2003, he and his wife Agneta bought a bookstore in Filipstad, a small town in the Swedish countryside. He became interested in Dylan in 1963. His first work on the recording artist, Words Fill My Head, Written, Spoken, Sung by Bob Dylan was self-published in 1989. Björner died on 12 September 2023, at the age of 80.

== Works ==
- Björner, Olof (2002). Olof's Files: A Bob Dylan Performance Guide 1958–1969 Volume 1. Hardinge Simpole. ISBN 1-84382-020-X.
- Björner, Olof (2003). Olof's Files: A Bob Dylan Performance Guide 1970–1977 Volume 2. Hardinge Simpole. ISBN 1-84382-036-6.
- Björner, Olof (2003). Olof's Files: A Bob Dylan Performance Guide 1978–1979 Volume 3. Hardinge Simpole. ISBN 1-84382-038-2.
- Björner, Olof (2003). Olof's Files: A Bob Dylan Performance Guide 1980–1985 Volume 4. Hardinge Simpole. ISBN 1-84382-040-4.
- Björner, Olof (2004). Olof's Files: A Bob Dylan Performance Guide 1986–1988 Volume 5. Hardinge Simpole. ISBN 1-84382-042-0.
- Björner, Olof (2002). Olof's Files: A Bob Dylan Performance Guide 1989–1990 Volume 6. Hardinge Simpole. ISBN 1-84382-026-9.
- Björner, Olof (2002). Olof's Files: A Bob Dylan Performance Guide 1991–1992 Volume 7. Hardinge Simpole. ISBN 1-84382-028-5.
- Björner, Olof (2002). Olof's Files: A Bob Dylan Performance Guide 1993–1994 Volume 8. Hardinge Simpole. ISBN 1-84382-030-7.
- Björner, Olof (2003). Olof's Files: A Bob Dylan Performance Guide 1995–1996 Volume 9. Hardinge Simpole. ISBN 1-84382-032-3.
- Björner, Olof (2003). Olof's Files: A Bob Dylan Performance Guide 1997–1998 Volume 10. Hardinge Simpole. ISBN 1-84382-034-X.
- Björner, Olof (2002). Olof's Files: A Bob Dylan Performance Guide 1999–2000 Volume 11. Hardinge Simpole. ISBN 1-84382-022-6.
- Björner, Olof (2004). Olof's Files: A Bob Dylan Performance Guide 2001–2002 Volume 12. Hardinge Simpole. ISBN 1-84382-044-7.
- Björner, Olof (2002). Olof's Files: A Bob Dylan Performance Guide 1958–2000 The Index Volume. Hardinge Simpole. ISBN 1-84382-024-2.
- Leyser, Brady J., and Olof Björner (2006). Bob Dylan Live in Canada: A Concert History, 1962–2005. Trafford Publishing. ISBN 1-4120-8372-9.
