= Cliff Butler =

American musician

- NASCO
- Born: Clifford B. Butler; August 3, 1923; Louisville, Kentucky, United States
- Died: January 13, 1982 (aged 58)
- Occupations: Musician, dj, pianist, minister

Cliff "Bishop" Butler (August 3, 1923 – January 13, 1982) was a DJ and a gospel, blues and R&B singer from Louisville, Kentucky, United States.

== Biography ==
Cliff Butler was born on October 17, 1922, in Louisville, Kentucky. His earliest music experiences were with a jug band in Louisville. After serving in the Army Air Corps in World War II, he returned to his hometown and organized a band to back his vocals. His first recordings were with Three Notes for Signature Records (1948), followed by recordings for King Records (1949). Butler began recording for the States label with a session on November 17, 1952. The session musicians included blind pianist Benny Holton, who regularly accompanied Butler, as well as Chicago stalwarts Leon Washington on tenor sax and Red Saunders on the drum stool. On one of these recordings, "Adam's Rib," he exhibited a strong Roy Brown influence. On another track from the session, "You're My Honey, But the Bees Don't Know It," Butler was accompanied by a vocal group from Louisville, The Doves.

Butler died of cancer on January 13, 1982, in Louisville, Kentucky.

== Discography ==
Title	Label	Release date
Crying Blues	King Records	1949
When You Love (You Should Love From The Heart)	King Records	1950
I Dream Such Foolish Dreams	King Records	1950
Gold Diggin' Baby	King Records	1950
Hearts Only Ache (Heart Never Break)	King Records	1950
Adam's Rib	States Records	1953
Benny's Blues	States Records	1953
People Will Talk	States Records	1953
When You Love	States Records	1953
Boogie With Lou	Dot Records	1953
Can't Get Her Off My Mind	Dot Records	1953
You're Honey But The Bees Don't Know It	States Records	1955
Jealous Hearted Woman	States Records	1955
On My Mind	NASCO Records	1957
My Mood	NASCO Records	1957
That's How I Go For You	NASCO Records	1958
Devoted To You	NASCO Records	1958
Love One Another	NASCO Records	1958
Devoted To You	NASCO Records	1958
Let Us Break Bread Together	NASCO Records	1958
