= Edward Gates White =

American musician

Edward Gates White (August 4, 1918 – December 27, 1992), sometimes credited as Ed Gates or The Great Gates, was an American rhythm and blues singer, pianist and bandleader who recorded in the 1940s and 1950s.

Although some sources claim he was born in Philadelphia, researchers Bob Eagle and Eric LeBlanc give his birthplace as Alabama. He moved to California in 1932, and established himself as a bandleader. With various bands, credited as the Hollywood All Stars or the Wampus Cats, he recorded sporadically for several labels between the mid-1940s and late 1950s. He also had a radio show on NBC in the mid-1940s, when he was known as "The Man in the Moon".

His biggest success as a recording artist came in 1949, when "Late After Hours" on the Selective label, credited to "The Great Gates", reached number 6 on the R&B chart. In 1952, he recorded in Chicago with bandleader Red Saunders, and later recorded in Los Angeles on the Aladdin, 4 Star and Specialty labels. His last recordings, as an organist, were in 1962, on the Robins Nest label.

White died in 1992, in Culver City, California.
