= L. C. McKinley =

American blues guitarist

- Born: Luke C. McKinley; October 22, 1918; Winona, Mississippi, U.S.
- Died: January 19, 1970 (aged 51) East Chicago, Indiana, U.S.
- Genres: Chicago blues
- Occupations: Guitarist, singer
- Instrument: Guitar
- Years active: Late 1940s–early 1960s

L. C. McKinley (October 22, 1918 – January 19, 1970) was an American Chicago blues guitarist. He worked with Eddie Boyd and Ernest Cotton. A performer in the Chicago blues scene, McKinley's major output was as a session musician on recordings made mostly in the 1950s.

He also released a number of singles on various record labels. His best-known tracks include "Weeping Willow Blues" and "Nit Wit." His guitar playing was influenced by T-Bone Walker.

== Biography ==
He was born Luke C. McKinley in Winona, Mississippi, United States. According to the United States Census in 1940, he was living in Vaiden, Mississippi, with his wife, Bessie, and two sons. He relocated to Chicago in 1941. He began to find work and by 1947 had started to play professionally in the Chicago area. By the early 1950s, he was a regular performer at the 708 Club, where he variously topped the bill or played accompaniment in the first half of 1954 with the Ernest Cotton Trio.

He began working with Eddie Boyd in the early 1950s. In 1952, McKinley and Cotton backed Boyd on the latter's recording of "Five Long Years", which reached number one on the Billboard R&B chart. McKinley also undertook recording sessions with several of Chicago's better-known blues musicians, including Curtis Jones. In 1953 he recorded for Parrot Records, but these recordings were not released. He signed with States Records in January 1954, which issued his "Companion Blues" later that year.

In 1955, McKinley signed a recording contract with Vee-Jay Records, which issued his single "Strange Girl", backed with "She's Five Feet Three", in the same year. Other tracks he recorded in that period, which were unissued at that time, included "Blue Evening", "Down with It", "Rosalie Blues", "Disgusted", and "Tortured Blues". In 1959, Bea & Baby Records released his single "Nit Wit".

McKinley made his last recordings in 1964, which were released on the Sunnyland label in the UK.

After leaving the music industry, he worked as a presser for a dry cleaning company in East Chicago, Indiana.

McKinley died in East Chicago, Indiana, on January 19, 1970, aged 51. His cause of death is unknown. In 2019 the Killer Blues Headstone Project placed the headstone for L.C. McKinley at Fern Oak Cemetery in Griffith, Indiana.

== Discography ==
=== Singles ===
Year	A-side	B-side	Record label
1954	"Companion Blues"	"Weeping Willow Blues"	States
1955	"Strange Girl"	"She's Five Feet Three"	Vee-Jay
1955	"Lonely"	"I'm So Satisfied"	Vee-Jay
1959	"Nit Wit"	"Sharpest Man in Town"	Bea & Baby
1964	"Mind Your Business"	"So Strange"	Sunnyland

=== Compilation albums ===
Year	Title	Record label
1982	Chicago Blues in the Groove	P-Vine Records
2002	Vee Jay Screaming Blues Guitar	P-Vine Records

== See also ==
- List of Chicago blues musicians
