= Trouble Blues (album) =

Studio album by Curtis Jones
- Released: 1961
- Recorded: November 9, 1960
- Studio: Van Gelder Studio, Englewood Cliffs, NJ
- Genre: Blues
- Length: 38:49
- Label: Bluesville; BVLP 1022
- Producer: Ozzie Cadena

Curtis Jones chronology
Trouble Blues (1961)	Lonesome Bedroom Blues (1962)

Trouble Blues is an album by blues musician Curtis Jones recorded in 1960 and released on the Bluesville label the following year.

== Reception ==
Professional ratings
Review scores
Source	Rating
AllMusic	4/5 stars
The Penguin Guide to Blues Recordings	2.5/4 stars

AllMusic stated: "The taciturn pianist in the company of a fine New York rhythm section and Johnny "Big Moose" Walker (but on guitar, not piano) made for a winning combination on this 1960 album".

== Track listing ==
All compositions by Curtis Jones except where noted

1. "Lonesome Bedroom Blues" – 3:26
2. "A Whole Lot of Talk for You" – 3:00
3. "Suicide Blues" (Armand "Jump" Jackson) – 4:09
4. "Please Say Yes" (Ozzie Cadena) – 2:38
5. "Weekend Blues" – 3:32
6. "Good Woman Blues" (Jackson) – 2:43
7. "Trouble Blues" (Cadena, Jones) – 5:05
8. "Love Season Blues" – 3:58
9. "Low Down Worried Blues" – 3:07
10. "Good Time Special" – 2:10
11. "Fool Blues" (Jackson) – 2:37
12. "Pinetop Boogie" (Pinetop Smith) – 2:54 Additional track on CD reissue

== Personnel ==
Performance

- Curtis Jones – piano, vocals
- Robert Banks – organ
- Johnny "Big Moose" Walker – guitar
- Leonard Gaskin – bass
- Sticks Evans – drums

Production

- Ozzie Cadena – supervision
- Rudy Van Gelder – engineer
