= Tommy McClennan =

American blues musician (1905–1961)

Background information
- Born: January 4, 1905; Durant, Mississippi, U.S.
- Died: May 9, 1961 (aged 56) Chicago, Illinois, U.S.
- Genres: Delta blues; country blues
- Instruments: Guitar; vocals
- Years active: 1939–1942
- Label: Bluebird

Tommy McClennan (January 4, 1905 – May 9, 1961) was an American Delta blues singer and guitarist.

== Life and career ==
McClennan was born in Durant, Mississippi, and grew up in the town. He played and sang blues in a rough, energetic style.

He made a series of recordings for Bluebird Records from 1939 through 1942. He regularly played with his friend Robert Petway. His voice is heard in the background on Petway's recording of "Boogie Woogie Woman" (1942). McClennan's singles in this period included "Bottle It Up and Go", "New Highway No. 51", "Shake 'Em on Down", and "Whiskey Head Woman".

Several of his songs have been covered by other musicians, including "Cross Cut Saw Blues" (covered by Albert King) and "My Baby's Gone" (Moon Mullican). Bob Dylan covered Tommy McClennan's track, "Highway 51" (which was written by Curtis Jones), on his self-titled debut album in 1962. McClennan's "I'm a Guitar King" was included in the 1959 collection The Country Blues, issued by Folkways Records.

McClennan died of bronchopneumonia in Chicago, Illinois, on May 9, 1961. In 2015 the Killer Blues Headstone Project placed a headstone for Tommy McClennan at Mt. Glenwood cemetery in Thornton, Illinois.

== Citation ==
"He had a different style of playing a guitar", Big Bill Broonzy said. "You just make the chords and change when you feel like changing"

John Fahey's compilation set Screamin' and Hollerin' the Blues: The Worlds of Charley Patton contained an interview with Booker Miller, a contemporary of Charlie Patton's, in which Miller mentioned someone who is most likely Tommy McClennan, though Miller did not know his name: "... and I saw another fella he put some records out, they (him and Willie Brown) be together, but he be by himself when I see him, they called him "Sugar"... I ain't never known him as nothing but Sugar, he put out a record called Bottle Up and Go... I sold him my guitar."

== See also ==
- List of Delta blues musicians
- List of people from Mississippi
