= The Bob Dylan Encyclopedia =

2006 compendium of articles by Michael Gray

Bob Dylan Encyclopedia
- First edition
- Author: Michael Gray
- Language: English
- Genre: Non-fiction, Criticism
- Publisher: Continuum Books
- Publication date: 2006
- Publication place: United Kingdom
- Media type: Print (Hardback)
- Pages: 736 pp
- ISBN: 0-8264-6933-7

The Bob Dylan Encyclopedia is a 2006 compendium of articles written by Michael Gray covering the life and work of Bob Dylan. It includes reviews of varying length for each album and numerous songs in Dylan's musical output, but is not just a work of music criticism. The topics for individual articles encompass Dylan's musical forebears, literary influences, personal acquaintances, key career events, musical associates, cultural context, forays into film and writing, and minutiae of all sorts.

Gray's opinions characterize the content found in the Encyclopedia. Gray connects Dylan to the tradition of country blues, and there are many articles relating to blues music and blues musicians, especially those from the 1920s and 1930s. Gray summarises the life and work of key early rock and roll performers from the 1950s, as well as entries on influential artists from the fields of country music and the folk music revival. There are also articles on historical figures, ranging from Robert Browning to Marshall McLuhan.

First editions of the Encyclopedia included a DVD duplicating its content, making it readable on the home computer.
