= Bob Dylan (album) =

1962 studio album by Bob Dylan

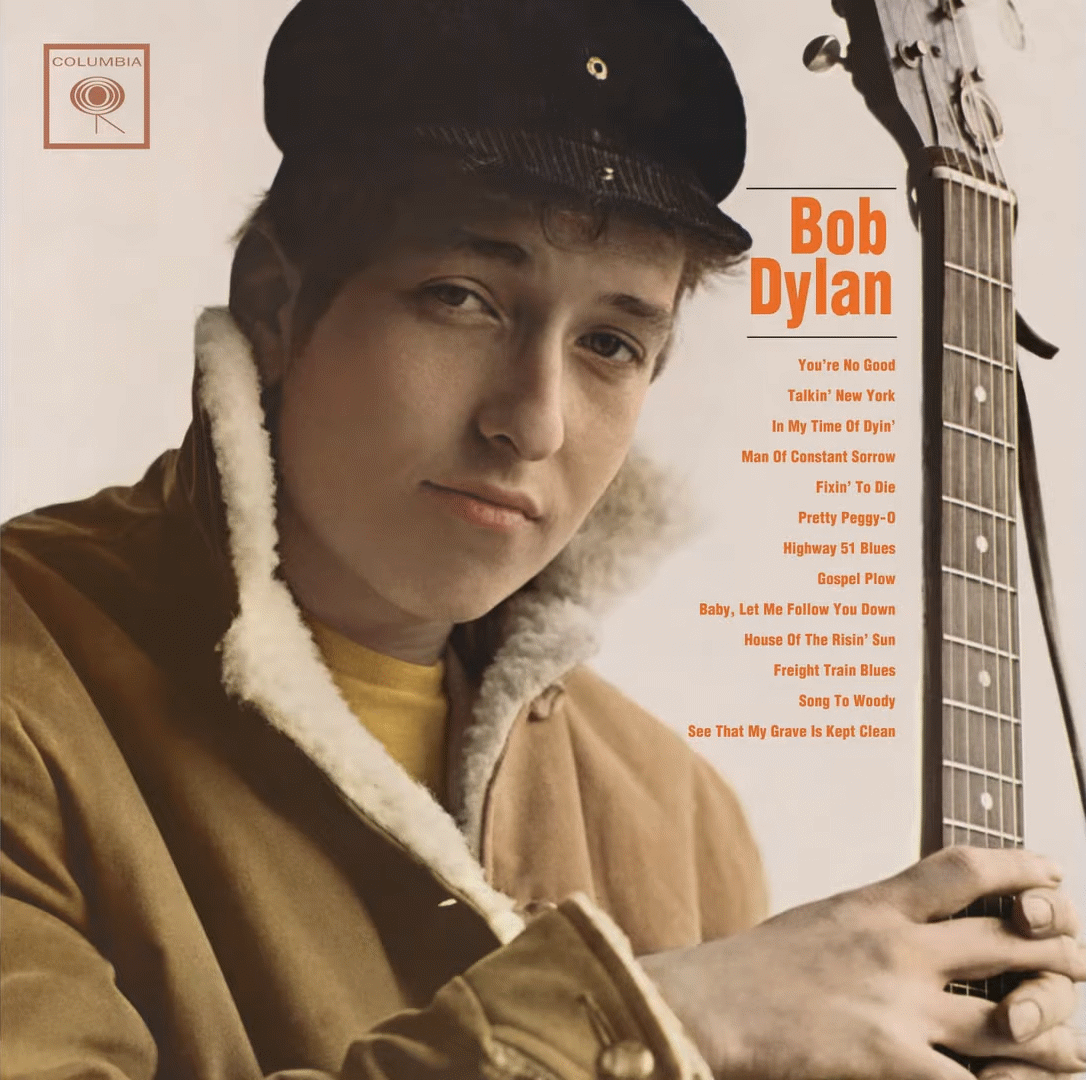

Studio album by Bob Dylan
- Released: March 19, 1962
- Recorded: November 20 and 22, 1961
- Studio: Columbia 7th Ave, New York City
- Genre: Folk; country blues; protest music
- Length: 36:54
- Label: Columbia
- Producer: John H. Hammond

Bob Dylan chronology
Bob Dylan (1962)	The Freewheelin' Bob Dylan (1963)

Bob Dylan is the debut studio album by the American singer-songwriter Bob Dylan, released on March 19, 1962, by Columbia Records. The album was produced by Columbia talent scout John H. Hammond, who had earlier signed Dylan to the label, a controversial decision at the time. The album primarily features folk standards but also includes two original compositions, "Talkin' New York" and "Song to Woody". The latter was an ode to Woody Guthrie, a significant influence in Dylan's early career.

The album received little attention at first, but began to sell as Dylan's career progressed. Three years after its release, it charted in the UK, reaching No. 13.

== Recording ==
Dylan met John Hammond at a rehearsal session for Carolyn Hester on September 14, 1961, at the apartment shared by Hester and her then-husband, Richard Fariña. Hester had invited Dylan to the session as a harmonica player, and Hammond approved him as a session player after hearing him rehearse, with recommendations from his son, musician John P. Hammond, and from Liam Clancy.

Hammond later told Robert Shelton that he decided to sign Dylan "on the spot" and invited him to the Columbia offices for a more formal audition recording. No record of that recording has turned up in Columbia's files, but Hammond, Dylan, and Columbia's A&R director Mitch Miller have all confirmed that an audition occurred.

On September 26, Dylan began a two-week run at Gerde's Folk City, second on the bill to The Greenbriar Boys. On September 29, an exceptionally favorable review of Dylan's performance appeared in the New York Times, written by Robert Shelton. The same day, Dylan played harmonica at Hester's recording session at Columbia's Manhattan studio. After the session, Hammond brought Dylan to his offices and presented him with Columbia's standard five-year contract for previously unrecorded artists, and Dylan signed immediately.

That night at Gerdes, Dylan told Shelton about Hammond's offer but asked him to "keep it quiet" until the contract's final approval had worked through the Columbia hierarchy. The label's official approvals came quickly.

Studio time was scheduled for late November. During the weeks leading up to those sessions, Dylan began searching for new material even though he was already familiar with many songs. According to Dylan's friend Carla Rotolo (sister of his girlfriend Suze Rotolo), "He spent most of his time listening to my records, days and nights. He studied the Folkways Anthology of American Folk Music, the singing of Ewan MacColl and A. L. Lloyd, Rabbit Brown's guitar, Guthrie, of course, and blues ... his record was in the planning stages. We were all concerned about what songs Dylan was going to do. I remember clearly talking about it."

The album was ultimately recorded in three short afternoon sessions on November 20 and 22 at Columbia's 7th Avenue studio. Hammond later joked that Columbia spent "about $402" to record it, and the figure has entered the Dylan legend as its actual cost. Despite the low cost and short amount of time, Dylan was still difficult to record, according to Hammond. "Bobby popped every p, hissed every s, and habitually wandered off mike," recalls Hammond. "Even more frustrating, he refused to learn from his mistakes. It occurred to me at the time that I'd never worked with anyone so undisciplined before."

Seventeen songs were recorded, and five of the album's chosen tracks were actually cut in single takes ("Baby, Let Me Follow You Down", "In My Time of Dyin'", "Gospel Plow", "Highway 51 Blues", and "Freight Train Blues") while the master take of "Song to Woody" was recorded after one false start. The album's four outtakes were also cut in single takes. During the sessions, Dylan refused requests to do second takes. "I said no. I can't see myself singing the same song twice in a row. That's terrible."

The album cover features a reversed photo of Dylan holding his acoustic guitar. This was done to prevent the neck of the guitar from obscuring Columbia's logo.

== Music ==
By the time sessions were held for his debut album, Dylan was absorbing an enormous amount of folk material from sitting and listening to contemporaries performing in New York's clubs and coffeehouses. Many of these individuals were also close friends who performed with Dylan, often inviting him to their apartments where they would introduce him to more folk songs. At the same time, Dylan was borrowing and listening to many folk, blues, and country records, many of which were hard to find at the time. Dylan claimed in the documentary No Direction Home that he needed to hear a song only once or twice to learn it.

The final album sequence of Bob Dylan features only two original compositions; the other eleven tracks are folk standards and traditional songs. Few of these were staples of his club/coffeehouse repertoire. Only two of the covers and both originals were in his club set in September 1961. Dylan stated in a 2000 interview that he was hesitant to reveal too much of himself at first.

Of the two original songs, "Song to Woody" is the better known. According to Clinton Heylin, the original handwritten manuscript to "Song to Woody" bears the following inscription at the bottom of the sheet: "Written by Bob Dylan in Mills Bar on Bleecker Street in New York City on the 14th day of February, for Woody Guthrie." Melodically, the song is based on one of Guthrie's own compositions, "1913 Massacre", but it is possible Guthrie fashioned "1913 Massacre" from an even earlier melody; like many folk singers, including Dylan, Guthrie would often adapt familiar folk melodies into new compositions. Guthrie was Dylan's main musical influence at the time of Bob Dylan's release, and indeed on several of the songs, Dylan is apparently imitating Guthrie's vocal mannerisms. "Talkin' New York" is closely based on Guthrie's song "Talking Dustbowl Blues" and also references "The Ballad of Pretty Boy Floyd".

Dylan takes an arranger's credit on many of the traditional songs, but a number of them can be traced to his contemporaries. For example, the arrangement of "House of the Rising Sun" was developed by Dave Van Ronk, who was a close friend at the time. Van Ronk had intended to record this arrangement himself and was upset that Dylan had recorded it. During his recording of "Baby Let Me Follow You Down", Dylan mentions the arranger, Eric Von Schmidt, whom he met in Cambridge, Massachusetts. Von Schmidt introduced the arrangement to Dylan as well as an arrangement for "He Was a Friend of Mine", which was also recorded for but omitted from Dylan's first album.

Dylan would leave most of these songs behind when he moved to the concert stage in 1962, but he performed "Man of Constant Sorrow" during his first national television appearance in mid-1963 (a performance included on the 2005 retrospective No Direction Home). "Baby Let Me Follow You Down" would later return in a driving electric arrangement during his 1965 and 1966 tours with the Hawks; a live recording was included on Live 1966.

After 1966, Dylan performed only five songs from his debut album in concert, and only "Song to Woody" and "Pretty Peggy-O" would be heard with any frequency.

== Outtakes ==
Three additional songs recorded during the Bob Dylan sessions were included on Volume 1 of the Bootleg Series: "House Carpenter", "He Was a Friend of Mine" and another original composition, "Man on the Street". A fourth outtake, "Ramblin' Blues" also known as "Ramblin' Round', written by Woody Guthrie, was officially released in 2025 on The Bootleg Series Vol. 18: Through the Open Window 1956–1963.

Of these four, the most celebrated is perhaps "House Carpenter", a new rendition of the 16th-century Scottish ballad "The Daemon Lover" and the final song recorded for Bob Dylan. Biographer Clinton Heylin described the song as "the most extraordinary performance of the sessions, as demonically driven as anything Robert Johnson put out in his name". Though it was a favorite at the time in folk circles, Dylan apparently never played "House Carpenter" in any documented performance.

An alternate (shortened) version of "House of the Rising Sun", heavily overdubbed with electric instruments in 1964 (produced by Tom Wilson), was later included on the Highway 61 Interactive CD-ROM.

== Critical reception ==
Professional ratings
Review scores
Source	Rating
AllMusic	4/5 stars
The Encyclopedia of Popular Music	4/5 stars
Entertainment Weekly	B
MusicHound	2/5 stars
The Rolling Stone Album Guide	4/5 stars
Tom Hull	B+

Bob Dylan did not receive acclaim until years later. "These debut songs are essayed with differing degrees of conviction," writes music critic Tim Riley in 1999, "[but] even when his reach exceeds his grasp, he never sounds like he knows he's in over his head, or gushily patronizing ... Like Elvis Presley, what Dylan can sing, he quickly masters; what he can't, he twists to his own devices. And as with the Presley Sun sessions, the voice that leaps from Dylan's first album is its most striking feature, a determined, iconoclastic baying that chews up influences, and spits out the odd mixed signal without half trying."

However, at the time of its release, Bob Dylan received little notice, and both Hammond and Dylan were soon dismissive of the album. The April 14, 1962, issue of Billboard magazine highlighted it as a 'special merit' release, saying, '[Dylan] is one of the most interesting, and most disciplined youngsters to appear on the pop-folk scene in a long time' with 'moving readings of originals such as "Song to Woody" and "Talkin' New York". Dylan when he finds his own style, could win a big following.' Despite this positive notice, the album also did not initially sell well, and Dylan was for a time known as "Hammond's Folly" in record company circles. Mitch Miller, Columbia's chief of A&R at the time, said U.S. sales totaled about 2,500 copies. Bob Dylan remains Dylan's only release not to chart whatsoever in the U.S., although it eventually reached No. 13 in the UK charts in 1965 in the wake of the success of The Freewheelin' Bob Dylan. Despite the album's poor sales, it was not a financial disaster because it was very cheap to record.

On December 22, 1961, a month to the day after Bob Dylan's final session, Dylan was in Minneapolis, Minnesota, where he and his friend Tony Glover paid a visit to their friend Bonnie Beecher. Dylan held an informal session at her apartment, performing 26 songs that Glover recorded on a reel-to-reel tape recorder. Often known by a misnomer, the Minneapolis Hotel Tape soon entered private circulation, providing a thorough look at Dylan's musical potential only a month after recording his debut album. A larger and far more diverse selection of songs, it was all recorded the night of the 22nd in roughly two and a half hours.

Among the songs recorded that night were the harrowing, racially charged morality tale "Black Cross", Big Joe Williams' "Baby, Please Don't Go" (in which Dylan displays his growing skills at bottleneck guitar), the Pentecostal "Wade in the Water", Dylan's reinterpretation of the traditional "Nine Hundred Miles" (retitled "I Was Young When I Left Home" and later issued on The Bootleg Series Vol. 7: No Direction Home: The Soundtrack), the traditional "Poor Lazarus", a Memphis Jug Band arrangement of the traditional "Stealin'", another rewritten folk song called "Hard Times in New York Town" (based on the traditional "Hard Times in the Country Working on Ketty's Farm" and subsequently released on The Bootleg Series Volumes 1–3 (Rare & Unreleased) 1961–1991), and the John Lomax discovery "Dink's Song". (According to Clinton Heylin, Lomax first heard the song "in 1908 when, across the Brazos river from Texas A&M College, he heard a lady called Dink sing her song.") First published in Folksong USA, Dylan's "hotel" recording would later be included on The Bootleg Series Vol. 7: No Direction Home: The Soundtrack.

Though only a few selections from the Minneapolis hotel tape were ever officially released, all twenty-six songs have been heavily bootlegged and celebrated by Greil Marcus, a music critic who wrote about the recordings in Rolling Stone magazine. As Heylin writes, some of these songs gave Dylan "an all-important clue as to how he might mold traditional melodies and sensibility to his own worldview". This would come to fruition when Dylan began work on his next album, The Freewheelin' Bob Dylan, a year later, by which time both Dylan's reputation and his stockpile of original compositions had grown considerably.

Bob Dylan was re-released in 2010 as the first of a 9 CD boxset titled The Original Mono Recordings, with new liner notes by Greil Marcus on a 60 pages booklet.

Because its copyright expired in Europe in 2012, several editions have appeared in the EU from competing oldies labels. One edition from Hoodoo Records included 12 bonus tracks (1 single and 11 live radio recordings from 1961 to 1962) and a 16-page booklet.

== Track listing ==
Side one
No.	Title	Writer(s)	Length
1.	"You're No Good"	Jesse Fuller	1:40
2.	"Talkin' New York"	Bob Dylan	3:20
3.	"In My Time of Dyin'"	Traditional, arranged by Dylan	2:40
4.	"Man of Constant Sorrow"	Traditional, arranged by Dylan	3:10
5.	"Fixin' to Die"	Bukka White	2:22
6.	"Pretty Peggy-O"	Traditional, arranged by Dylan	3:23
7.	"Highway 51"	Curtis Jones	2:52
Total length:			19:27

Side two
No.	Title	Writer(s)	Length
1.	"Gospel Plow"	Traditional, arranged by Dylan	1:47
2.	"Baby, Let Me Follow You Down"	Traditional, arranged by Eric Von Schmidt	2:37
3.	"House of the Risin' Sun"	Traditional, arranged by Dave Van Ronk	5:20
4.	"Freight Train Blues"	John Lair, arranged by Mississippi Fred McDowell, the remastered version was arranged by Dylan	2:18
5.	"Song to Woody"	Dylan	2:42
6.	"See That My Grave Is Kept Clean"	Blind Lemon Jefferson	2:43
Total length:			17:27

2013 Hoodoo reissue bonus tracks
No.	Title	Writer(s)	Length
14.	"Mixed-Up Confusion" (single)	Dylan	2:30
15.	"Roll On John" (live)	Traditional, arranged by Dylan	3:16
16.	"Hard Times in New York" (live)	Dylan	2:32
17.	"Smokestack Lightning" (live)	Chester Burnett	3:03
18.	"Stealin' Stealin'" (live)	G. Gannon	3:24
19.	"Baby, Please Don't Go" (live)	Joe Williams	2:19
20.	"The Death of Emmett Till" (live)	Dylan	5:11
21.	"Man on the Street" (live)	Dylan	2:25
22.	"Omie Wise" (live)	Traditional	4:02
23.	"Don't Think Twice, It's All Right" (live)	Dylan	3:21
24.	"The Girl I Left Behind" (live)	Traditional, arranged by Dylan	5:39
25.	"Blowin' in the Wind" (live)	Dylan	2:29

== Personnel ==
- Bob Dylan – vocals, acoustic guitar, harmonica
- John H. Hammond – production

== Charts ==
Album

Year	Chart	Position
1965	UK Top 75	13

== Certifications ==
Region	Certification	Certified units/sales
United Kingdom (BPI) 1989 release	Silver	60,000^{^}
^{^} Shipments figures based on certification alone.

== Bibliography ==
- Dylan, Bob. Chronicles: Volume 1. Simon and Schuster, October 5, 2004, hardcover, 208 pages. ISBN 0-7432-2815-4
- Hammond, John. John Hammond On Record, Ridge Press, 1977, 416 pages. ISBN 0-671-40003-7. Title sometimes reported as On the Record.
- Heylin, Clinton. Bob Dylan: A Life In Stolen Moments, Schirmer Books, 1986, 403 pages. ISBN 0-8256-7156-6. Also known as Bob Dylan: Day By Day
- Heylin, Clinton. Bob Dylan: Behind the Shades Revisited. Perennial Currents, 2003, 800 pages. ISBN 0-06-052569-X
- Shelton, Robert, No Direction Home, Da Capo Press, 2003 reprint of 1986 original, 576 pages. ISBN 0-306-81287-8
- Greene, Andy. 50 Years Ago Today: Bob Dylan Released His Debut Album. Rolling Stone, 2012
