= Curtis Jones (pianist) =

American blues pianist

Background information
- Born: August 18, 1906; Naples, Texas, U.S.
- Died: September 11, 1971 (aged 65) Munich, West Germany
- Genres: Piano blues
- Occupation: Musician
- Instrument: Piano
- Years active: Late 1930s–1971
- Labels: Vocalion; Okeh; Bluebird; Parrot; Bluesville; Delmark; Decca; Blue Horizon

Curtis Jones (August 18, 1906 – September 11, 1971) was an American blues pianist.

== Biography ==
Jones was born in Naples, Texas, to sharecropping parents, and played guitar whilst young but switched to piano after a move to Dallas. He often played guitar on one or two songs on his albums and at live performances. In 1936 he relocated to Chicago, where he recorded between 1937 and 1941 on Vocalion, Bluebird, and OKeh. Among his best-known tunes from these recordings were the hit "Lonesome Bedroom Blues" and the song "Tin Pan Alley". His "Decoration Blues" though unissued at the time, was recorded by Sonny Boy Williamson I in 1938. World War II interrupted his recording career, which he did not resume until 1953, when a single of his, "Wrong Blues"/"Cool Playing Blues", was released on Parrot, featuring L. C. McKinley on guitar.

Jones's first album appeared in 1960 on Bluesville, by which time he had become a noted performer on the Chicago folk music scene. A solo album was released in 1962, by which time Jones had moved to Europe. He lived there and in Morocco for the rest of his life. He made further albums in the UK, including one in 1968 that featured Alexis Korner on guitar.

A song called "Highway 51 Blues", was included on Bob Dylan's 1962 debut album, but it was a completely different song from Jones'. Bob Dylan.

Jones died of heart failure in Munich, West Germany, in 1971, at the age of 65.

== Discography ==
- Trouble Blues (Bluesville, 1960)
- Lonesome Bedroom Blues (Delmark, 1962)
- Americans in Europe Vol. 2 (Impulse!, 1963)
- In London (Decca, 1964)
- Now Resident in Europe (Blue Horizon, 1968)
- Blues and Trouble (Oldie Blues OL 2824, 1980)
