= Michael Gray (author) =

British author (born 1946)

- Born: 25 August 1946 (age 80); Bromborough
- Education: University of York
- Occupation: Author
- Writing career
- Language: English
- Subject: Popular music
- Website: Official website

Michael Gray (born 25 August 1946) is a British author who has written extensively about Bob Dylan and popular music.

== Biography ==
Gray was born in Bromborough, Wirral. He grew up on Merseyside, attended Birkenhead School, and read History and English literature at the University of York. He subsequently lived and worked in North Devon, Birmingham, West Malvern, London and North Yorkshire. He is married to the food writer Sarah Beattie. In 2008, they moved to South-West France.

In 1972, Gray published the first critical study of Dylan's work, Song & Dance Man: The Art of Bob Dylan; this work was greatly expanded into Song & Dance Man III: The Art Of Bob Dylan (1999, 2000). In 2006, Gray published the Bob Dylan Encyclopedia, which received favourable reviews from the music press and newspapers.

In 2007, Gray published Hand Me My Travelin' Shoes - In Search of Blind Willie McTell, both a travelogue and a detailed biography of the influential blues singer Blind Willie McTell. This work was shortlisted for the James Tait Black Memorial Prize for Biography in 2008.

Gray was the Mary Amelia Cummins Harvey Visiting Fellow Commoner at Girton College, Cambridge, in 2005. He established a Bob Dylan blog in 2006. His official website was created in 2011. In 2015 he received the higher doctorate of D.Litt. (Doctor of Letters in English) from the University of York.

In 2021, Gray published Outtakes on Bob Dylan, a selection of his writings on Dylan from 1967 to 2021. It contained a new 60-page assessment of Dylan's album Rough and Rowdy Ways.

== Principal works ==
- Song & Dance Man: The Art Of Bob Dylan (1972, 1973)
- Mother!: The Frank Zappa Story (1985, 1992, 1994, 2007, also published in Italy 1986 and Germany 1994)
- The Elvis Atlas: A Journey Through Elvis Presley's America (1996, 2011) - co-author
- All Across The Telegraph: A Bob Dylan Handbook (1987, 1988) - co-editor
- The Art Of Bob Dylan: Song & Dance Man (1981, 1982)
- Song & Dance Man III: The Art of Bob Dylan (1999, 2000)
- The Bob Dylan Encyclopedia (2006, revised & expanded 2008)
- Hand Me My Travelin' Shoes: In Search Of Blind Willie McTell (2007)
- Outtakes on Bob Dylan (2021)
