= Never Ending Tour 2013 =

2013 concert tour by Bob Dylan

- Tour by Bob Dylan
- Poster to the concert in Glasgow, Scotland
- Location: North America; Europe
- Start date: April 5, 2013
- End date: November 28, 2013
- Legs: 3
- No. of shows: 50 in North America; 35 in Europe; 85 in total

Bob Dylan concert chronology
- Never Ending Tour 2012 (2012); Never Ending Tour 2013 (2013); Never Ending Tour 2014 (2014)

The Never Ending Tour is the popular name for Bob Dylan's endless touring schedule since June 7, 1988. The 2013 tour marked the Never Ending Tour's 25th anniversary.

== Background ==
On December 3, 2012, it was stated in Isis Magazine that Dylan will be touring Asia in the Spring of 2013 with negotiations for venues being finalised. It is rumoured that the tour has been moved to the summer of 2013 alongside dates in Australia including an appearance at the Splendour in the Grass festival in Byron Bay, New South Wales and a concert at the Sydney Opera House. However, on February 25, 2013, one concert in California, Pennsylvania was leaked at Ticketmaster.

Thirteen dates for the first leg, in North America, were announced at Dylan's official website on February 27, 2013, beginning on April 5 in Buffalo, New York and currently ending in Saint Augustine, Florida on May. More concerts in the South Eastern States were added a week later.

A summer tour of the US was announced in April 2013 called the Americanarama Festival of Music. The tour comprises 26 shows beginning on June 26 in West Palm Beach, Florida and ending on August 4 in Mountain View, California.

Dylan's official website announced a European tour taking place between October and November on June 13, 2013. The tour included nine concerts in the UK, three concerts each in Glasgow, Blackpool and London. The London concerts took place at the Royal Albert Hall, where Dylan hadn't performed since May 27, 1966.

== Reception ==
The first leg of the tour was met with a very good reception by fans and critics alike. In Akron, Ohio one critic claimed "The performance enthralled the capacity crowd." In Ithaca Zachary Zahos said "Seeing him move about, listening to what he's doing and witnessing how he continues to make himself relevant at 71 years young – How's that for inspiration." In Bethlehem, Pennsylvania "Bob Dylan didn't utter a single word to the audience; he knew the music would tell them everything they needed to know." And in California, Pennsylvania "Bob Dylan played with renewed vigour and the centerpiece was a jangly and textured version of 'Visions of Johanna' that was a slice of heaven."

== Opening acts ==
- Dawes: Spring 2013 (except April 27 & 28)
- The Wild Feathers: April 27 & 28 2013
- Bob Weir: June 26 – 30
- Wilco: June 26 – August 4
- My Morning Jacket: June 26 – August 4 (except July 27)
- Richard Thompson Electric Trio: July 2 – July 15
- Ryan Bingham: July 18 – August 4
- Garth Hudson (with Wilco): July 21
- Beck: July 27

== Set list ==
This set list is representative of the performance on November 28, 2013, in London, England. It does not represent all concerts for the duration of the tour.

1. "Things Have Changed"
2. "She Belongs to Me"
3. "Beyond Here Lies Nothin'"
4. "What Good Am I?"
5. "Duquesne Whistle"
6. "Waiting for You"
7. "Pay in Blood"
8. "Tangled Up in Blue"
9. "Love Sick"
10. "High Water (For Charley Patton)"
11. "Simple Twist of Fate"
12. "Early Roman Kings"
13. "Forgetful Heart"
14. "Spirit on the Water"
15. "Scarlet Town"
16. "Soon After Midnight"
17. "Long and Wasted Years"
18. "All Along the Watchtower"
19. "Blowin' in the Wind"

Songs performed

The Freewheelin' Bob Dylan

- Blowin' in the Wind
- Girl from the North Country
- A Hard Rain's a-Gonna Fall
- Don't Think Twice, It's All Right

The Times They Are a-Changin'

- Boots of Spanish Leather

Another Side of Bob Dylan

- I Don't Believe You (She Acts Like We Never Have Met)
- It Ain't Me Babe

Bringing It All Back Home

- She Belongs to Me
- It's Alright, Ma (I'm Only Bleeding)

Highway 61 Revisited

- Ballad of a Thin Man
- Queen Jane Approximately
- Highway 61 Revisited
- Just Like Tom Thumb's Blues
- Desolation Row

Blonde on Blonde

- Rainy Day Women#12 & 35
- Visions of Johanna
- Leopard-Skin Pill-Box Hat
- Most Likely You Go Your Way and I'll Go Mine

John Wesley Harding

- All Along the Watchtower

Bob Dylan's Greatest Hits Vol. II

- Watching the River Flow

Blood on the Tracks

- Tangled Up in Blue
- Simple Twist of Fate

Shot of Love

- Every Grain of Sand

Oh Mercy

- Man in the Long Black Coat
- What Good Am I?
- Shooting Star

Under the Red Sky

- Under the Red Sky

The Bootleg Series Volumes 1–3 (Rare & Unreleased) 1961–1991

- Blind Willie McTell

Time Out of Mind

- Love Sick
- Make You Feel My Love

"Love And Theft"

- Tweedle Dee & Tweedle Dum
- Summer Days
- High Water (For Charley Patton)
- Honest With Me
- Cry A While

Modern Times

- Thunder on the Mountain
- Spirit on the Water
- Rollin' and Tumblin'
- When the Deal Goes Down
- Workingman's Blues #2
- The Levee's Gonna Break
- Ain't Talkin'

Together Through Life

- Beyond Here Lies Nothin'
- Forgetful Heart

Tempest

- Duquesne Whistle
- Soon After Midnight
- Long Wasted Years
- Pay in Blood
- Scarlet Town
- Early Roman Kings
- Roll on John

Non-Album songs

- Positively 4th Street
- Things Have Changed
- Waiting for You

Cover songs

- 1952 Vincent Black Lightning (Originally by Richard Thompson)
- Let Your Light Shine on Me (trad.)
- Suzie Baby (Originally by Bobby Vee)
- The Weight (Originally by The Band)
- Twelve Gates to the City (trad.)

== Tour dates ==
Date	City	Country	Venue	Attendance	Box Office
North America
April 5, 2013	Buffalo	United States	SUNY Alumni Arena	—	—
April 6, 2013	Amherst	United States	William D. Mullins Memorial Center	—	—
April 8, 2013	Kingston	United States	Thomas M. Ryan Center	—	—
April 9, 2013	Lowell	United States	Paul E. Tsongas Center at UMass Lowell	—	—
April 10, 2013	Lewiston	United States	Androscoggin Bank Colisée	—	—
April 12, 2013	Newark	United States	Bob Carpenter Center	—	—
April 13, 2013	California	United States	CUP Convocation Center	—	—
April 14, 2013	Ithaca	United States	Barton Hall	—	—
April 16, 2013	Richmond	United States	Landmark Theater	3,461 / 3,478	$170,875
April 18, 2013	Bethlehem	United States	Stabler Arena	—	—
April 19, 2013	Akron	United States	E. J. Thomas Hall	—	—
April 20, 2013	Kalamazoo	United States	Wings Stadium	—	—
April 21, 2013	Bowling Green	United States	Stroh Center	—	—
April 23, 2013	St. Louis	United States	Peabody Opera House	—	—
April 24, 2013	Springfield	United States	JQH Arena	—	—
April 25, 2013	Champaign	United States	Champaign Assembly Hall	—	—
April 27, 2013	Murray	United States	CFSB Center	—	—
April 28, 2013	Louisville	United States	The Louisville Palace	2,183 / 2,573	$127,808
April 30, 2013	Asheville	United States	U.S. Cellular Center	—	—
May 1, 2013	Charlotte	United States	Time Warner Cable Uptown Amphitheatre	2,447 / 2,447	$180,364
May 2, 2013	Raleigh	United States	Red Hat Amphitheater	—	—
May 4, 2013	Charleston	United States	Family Circle Magazine Stadium	4,061 / 6,468	$154,348
May 5, 2013	Saint Augustine	United States	St. Augustine Amphitheatre	—	—
Americanarama Festival of Music
June 26, 2013	West Palm Beach	United States	Cruzan Amphitheatre	—	—
June 27, 2013	Tampa	United States	MidFlorida Credit Union Amphitheatre	—	—
June 29, 2013	Atlanta	United States	Aaron's Amphitheatre at Lakewood	—	—
June 30, 2013	Nashville	United States	The Lawn at Riverfront Park	—	—
July 2, 2013	Memphis	United States	AutoZone Park	—	—
July 3, 2013	Tuscaloosa	United States	Tuscaloosa Amphitheater	3,050 / 7,052	$193,605
July 5, 2013	Noblesville	United States	Klipsch Music Center	—	—
July 6, 2013	Cincinnati	United States	Riverbend Music Center	—	—
July 9, 2013	Duluth	United States	Bayfront Park	5,733 / 8,000	$386,978
July 10, 2013	Saint Paul	United States	Midway Stadium	14,223 / 14,223	$960,053
July 11, 2013	Peoria	United States	Peoria Civic Center	—	—
July 12, 2013	Bridgeview	United States	Toyota Park	11,075 / 13,068	$689,308
July 14, 2013	Clarkston	United States	DTE Energy Music Theatre	—	—
July 15, 2013	Toronto	Canada	Molson Canadian Amphitheatre	—	—
July 18, 2013	Corfu	United States	Darien Lake Performing Arts Center	—	—
July 19, 2013	Bridgeport	United States	Webster Bank Arena	—	—
July 20, 2013	Mansfield	United States	Comcast Center	—	—
July 21, 2013	Saratoga Springs	United States	Saratoga Performing Arts Center	—	—
July 23, 2013	Columbia	United States	Merriweather Post Pavilion	—	—
July 24, 2013	Virginia Beach	United States	Farm Bureau Live at Virginia Beach	—	—
July 26, 2013	Hoboken	United States	Pier A Park	13,553 / 14,530	$990,116
July 27, 2013	Wantagh	United States	Nikon at Jones Beach Theater	—	—
July 28, 2013	Camden	United States	Susquehanna Bank Center	—	—
July 31, 2013	Greenwood Village	United States	Comfort Dental Amphitheatre	—	—
August 1, 2013	West Valley City	United States	USANA Amphitheatre	—	—
August 3, 2013	Irvine	United States	Verizon Wireless Amphitheatre	—	—
August 4, 2013	Mountain View	United States	Shoreline Amphitheatre	—	—
Europe
October 10, 2013	Oslo	Norway	Oslo Spektrum	—	—
October 12, 2013	Stockholm	Sweden	Waterfront Congress Centre	—	—
October 13, 2013	Stockholm	Sweden	Waterfront Congress Centre	—	—
October 15, 2013	Copenhagen	Denmark	Falconer Salen	—	—
October 16, 2013	Copenhagen	Denmark	Falconer Salen	—	—
October 18, 2013	Hanover	Germany	Swiss Life Hall	—	—
October 19, 2013	Hamburg	Germany	Congress Center Hamburg	—	—
October 20, 2013	Hamburg	Germany	Congress Center Hamburg	—	—
October 22, 2013	Düsseldorf	Germany	Mitsubishi Electric Halle	—	—
October 24, 2013	Berlin	Germany	Tempodrom	—	—
October 25, 2013	Berlin	Germany	Tempodrom	—	—
October 26, 2013	Berlin	Germany	Tempodrom	—	—
October 28, 2013	Geneva	Switzerland	SEG Geneva Arena	—	—
October 30, 2013	Amsterdam	Netherlands	Heineken Music Hall	—	—
October 31, 2013	Amsterdam	Netherlands	Heineken Music Hall	—	—
November 2, 2013	Milan	Italy	Teatro degli Arcimboldi	—	—
November 3, 2013	Milan	Italy	Teatro degli Arcimboldi	—	—
November 4, 2013	Milan	Italy	Teatro degli Arcimboldi	—	—
November 6, 2013	Rome	Italy	Atlántico Live	—	—
November 7, 2013	Rome	Italy	Atlántico Live	—	—
November 8, 2013	Padua	Italy	Gran Teatro Geox	—	—
November 10, 2013	Brussels	Belgium	Forest National	6,755 / 8,399	$584,514
November 12, 2013	Paris	France	Le Grand Rex	—	—
November 13, 2013	Paris	France	Le Grand Rex	—	—
November 14, 2013	Paris	France	Le Grand Rex	—	—
November 16, 2013	Esch-sur-Alzette	Luxembourg	Rockhal	—	—
November 18, 2013	Glasgow	Scotland	Clyde Auditorium	—	—
November 19, 2013	Glasgow	Scotland	Clyde Auditorium	—	—
November 20, 2013	Glasgow	Scotland	Clyde Auditorium	—	—
November 22, 2013	Blackpool	England	Opera House Theatre, Blackpool	—	—
November 23, 2013	Blackpool	England	Opera House Theatre, Blackpool	—	—
November 24, 2013	Blackpool	England	Opera House Theatre, Blackpool	—	—
November 26, 2013	London	England	Royal Albert Hall	—	—
November 27, 2013	London	England	Royal Albert Hall	—	—
November 28, 2013	London	England	Royal Albert Hall	—	—
TOTAL				66,541 / 80,238 (83%)	$4,437,969

Cancellations and rescheduled shows

July 7, 2013	Columbus, Ohio	Nationwide Arena	Cancelled due to poor ticket sales.
July 11, 2013	Peoria, Illinois	Chiefs Stadium	Moved to Peoria Civic Center.
July 19, 2013	Bridgeport, Connecticut	The Ballpark at Harbor Yard	Moved to Webster Bank Arena.
November 8, 2013	Florence	Teatro Comunale Florence	Moved to Gran Teatro Geox in Padua.

== Personnel ==
- Bob Dylan — Piano, Harmonica, Vocals
- Tony Garnier — Bass guitar
- Stu Kimball — Acoustic guitar, Electric guitar
- George G. Receli — Drums, Percussion
- Duke Robillard — Lead guitar (April 5 – June 30)
- Charlie Sexton — Lead guitar (July 2–14, 26 & 27, 31, October 10 – present)
- Colin Linden — Lead guitar (July 15–24, 28, August 1–4)
