= Never Ending Tour 2014 =

2014 concert tour by Bob Dylan

- Tour by Bob Dylan
- Poster to the concerts in Australia
- Location: Asia; North America; Europe; Oceania
- Start date: March 31, 2014
- End date: December 3, 2014
- Legs: 4
- No. of shows: 17 in Asia; 35 in North America; 21 in Europe; 19 in Oceania; 92 in total

Bob Dylan concert chronology
- Never Ending Tour 2013 (2013); Never Ending Tour 2014 (2014); Never Ending Tour 2015 (2015)

The Never Ending Tour is the popular name for Bob Dylan's endless touring schedule since June 7, 1988. In 2014, his schedule ran from March to December.

== Background ==
The first leg of the tour taking place solely in Japan was announced on Christmas Eve 2013, with large gaps between several dates. Three extra dates in Tokyo were eventually announced in late February 2014.

It was announced via Dylan's official website that he and his band would perform two shows in Hawaii in April, one taking place in Maui and the second taking place in Honolulu. This was the first time that Dylan had performed in the state in twenty-two years; he last performed there in April 1992.

Dates of a European tour were slowly published through several unofficial Dylan websites before being officially announced on BobDylan.com in March 2014. The European leg began in Cork, Ireland, at the Live at the Marquee Festival and his appearance was met with relatively positive reviews.

On May 26 a six-city Australian tour was announced, with several extra dates being added later throughout the early (Southern Hemisphere) winter. The same announcement revealed two New Zealand shows, bypassing the city of Auckland. On August 18 a one-off small club show at the Tivoli in Brisbane was announced, billed as a "once in a life-time concert performance".

The final leg of the tour, taking place in North America throughout the autumn and early winter, was announced on August 27, one day after the announcement of The Bootleg Series Vol. 11: The Complete Basement Tapes.

== Set list ==
This set list is representative of the performance on October 24, 2014 in Los Angeles, California. It does not represent all concerts for the duration of the tour.

Set One

1. "Things Have Changed"
2. "She Belongs to Me"
3. "Beyond Here Lies Nothin'"
4. "Workingman's Blues #2"
5. "Waiting for You"
6. "Duquesne Whistle"
7. "Pay in Blood"
8. "Tangled Up in Blue"
9. "Love Sick"

Set Two

10. "High Water (For Charley Patton)"
11. "Simple Twist of Fate"
12. "Early Roman Kings"
13. "Forgetful Heart"
14. "Spirit on the Water"
15. "Scarlet Town"
16. "Soon After Midnight"
17. "Long and Wasted Years"

Encore

18. "Blowin' in the Wind"
19. "Stay With Me"

Songs performed

The Freewheelin' Bob Dylan

- Blowin' in the Wind
- Girl from the North Country
- A Hard Rain's a-Gonna Fall
- Don't Think Twice, It's All Right

Another Side of Bob Dylan

- To Ramona

Bringing It All Back Home

- She Belongs to Me

Highway 61 Revisited

- Ballad of a Thin Man
- Just Like Tom Thumb's Blues
- Desolation Row

Blonde on Blonde

- Rainy Day Women ♯12 & 35
- Visions of Johanna
- Most Likely You Go Your Way and I'll Go Mine

John Wesley Harding

- All Along the Watchtower

Bob Dylan's Greatest Hits Vol. II

- Watching the River Flow

Blood on the Tracks

- Tangled Up in Blue
- Simple Twist of Fate
- Shelter from the Storm

Oh Mercy

- What Good Am I?

The Bootleg Series Volumes 1–3

- Blind Willie McTell

Time Out of Mind

- Love Sick
- Million Miles
- Tryin' to Get to Heaven

"Love and Theft"

- Tweedle Dee & Tweedle Dum
- Summer Days
- Lonesome Day Blues
- High Water (For Charley Patton)
- Cry A While

Modern Times

- Thunder on the Mountain
- Spirit on the Water
- Workingman Blues #2
- The Levee's Gonna Break

The Bootleg Series Vol. 8: Tell Tale Signs

- Huck's Tune

Together Through Life

- Beyond Here Lies Nothin'
- Forgetful Heart

Tempest

- Duquesne Whistle
- Soon After Midnight
- Long and Wasted Years
- Pay in Blood
- Scarlet Town
- Early Roman Kings

Shadows in the Night

- Stay With Me

Non-album songs

- Things Have Changed
- Waiting for You

== Tour dates ==
Date	City	Country	Venue	Attendance	Box Office
Asia
March 31, 2014	Tokyo	Japan	Zepp Diver City	—N/a	—N/a
April 1, 2014	Tokyo	Japan	Zepp Diver City	—N/a	—N/a
April 3, 2014	Tokyo	Japan	Zepp Diver City	—N/a	—N/a
April 4, 2014	Tokyo	Japan	Zepp Diver City	—N/a	—N/a
April 5, 2014	Tokyo	Japan	Zepp Diver City	—N/a	—N/a
April 7, 2014	Tokyo	Japan	Zepp Diver City	—N/a	—N/a
April 8, 2014	Tokyo	Japan	Zepp Diver City	—N/a	—N/a
April 9, 2014	Tokyo	Japan	Zepp Diver City	—N/a	—N/a
April 10, 2014	Tokyo	Japan	Zepp Diver City	—N/a	—N/a
April 13, 2014	Sapporo	Japan	Zepp Sapporo	—N/a	—N/a
April 14, 2014	Sapporo	Japan	Zepp Sapporo	—N/a	—N/a
April 17, 2014	Nagoya	Japan	Zepp Nagoya	—N/a	—N/a
April 18, 2014	Nagoya	Japan	Zepp Nagoya	—N/a	—N/a
April 19, 2014	Fukuoka	Japan	Zepp Fukuoka	—N/a	—N/a
April 21, 2014	Osaka	Japan	Zepp Namba	—N/a	—N/a
April 22, 2014	Osaka	Japan	Zepp Namba	—N/a	—N/a
April 23, 2014	Osaka	Japan	Zepp Namba	—N/a	—N/a
North America
April 26, 2014	Kahului	United States	Maui Arts & Cultural Center	—N/a	—N/a
April 29, 2014	Honolulu	United States	Neal S. Blaisdell Center	—N/a	—N/a
Europe
June 16, 2014 (Note: The June 16, 2015 concert in Cork was part of Live at the Marquee.)	Cork	Ireland	The Docklands	—N/a	—N/a
June 17, 2014	Dublin	Ireland	The O_{2}	—N/a	—N/a
June 20, 2014	Istanbul	Turkey	Black Box Istanbul	—N/a	—N/a
June 22, 2014	Thessaloniki	Greece	Thessaloniki Harbor	—N/a	—N/a
June 23, 2014	Athens	Greece	Terra Vibe Park	—N/a	—N/a
June 25, 2014	Bucharest	Romania	Sala Palatului	—N/a	—N/a
June 27, 2014	Košice	Slovakia	Steel Aréna	—N/a	—N/a
June 28, 2014 (Note: The June 28, 2015 concert in Vienna was originally scheduled to take place on July 2, 2014 but was rescheduled to make way for the concert in Prague.)	Vienna	Austria	Wiener Stadthalle 2	—N/a	—N/a
June 29, 2014 (Note: The June 29, 2015 concert in Oberosterreich was part of Clam Live.)	Upper Austria	Austria	Burg Clam	—N/a	—N/a
July 1, 2014 (Note: The July 1, 2015 concert in Munich was part of Tollwood Summer Festival.)	Munich	Germany	Munich Olympiapark	—N/a	—N/a
July 2, 2014	Prague	Czech Republic	O_{2} Arena	—N/a	—N/a
July 3, 2014	Zwickau	Germany	Stadthalle Zwickau	—N/a	—N/a
July 5, 2014 (Note: The July 5, 2015 concert in Słupsk was part of Rock Legend Festival.)	Słupsk	Poland	Dolina Charlotty Amphitheatre	—N/a	—N/a
July 7, 2014	Rostock	Germany	Stadthalle Rostock	—N/a	—N/a
July 8, 2014	Flensburg	Germany	Flens-Arena	—N/a	—N/a
July 9, 2014	Aarhus	Denmark	Musikhuset Aarhus	—N/a	—N/a
July 11, 2014 (Note: The July 11, 2015 concert in Stavern was part of Stavernfestivalen.)	Stavern	Norway	Skråvika Stavern	—N/a	—N/a
July 12, 2014 (Note: The July 12, 2015 concert in Stavern was part of Odderøya Live.)	Kristiansand	Norway	Bendiktsbukta	—N/a	—N/a
July 14, 2014	Helsingborg	Sweden	Sofiero Castle	—N/a	—N/a
July 15, 2014	Gothenburg	Sweden	Trädgårdsföreningen	—N/a	—N/a
July 17, 2014 (Note: The July 17, 2015 concert in Pori was part of Pori Jazz.)	Pori	Finland	Kirjurinluoto Arena	—N/a	—N/a
Oceania
August 9, 2014	Hamilton	New Zealand	Claudelands Arena	7,271 / 7,640	$656,978
August 10, 2014	Hamilton	New Zealand	Claudelands Arena	7,271 / 7,640	$656,978
August 13, 2014	Perth	Australia	Riverside Theatre	6,409 / 6,747	$852,829
August 14, 2014	Perth	Australia	Riverside Theatre	6,409 / 6,747	$852,829
August 15, 2014	Perth	Australia	Riverside Theatre	6,409 / 6,747	$852,829
August 18, 2014	Melbourne	Australia	Palais Theatre	10,952 / 11,504	$1,663,660
August 19, 2014	Melbourne	Australia	Palais Theatre	10,952 / 11,504	$1,663,660
August 20, 2014	Melbourne	Australia	Palais Theatre	10,952 / 11,504	$1,663,660
August 21, 2014	Melbourne	Australia	Palais Theatre	10,952 / 11,504	$1,663,660
August 25, 2014	Brisbane	Australia	Brisbane Convention & Exhibition Centre	3,112 / 3,154	$461,681
August 27, 2014	Brisbane	Australia	The Tivoli	1,510 / 1,510	$122,095
August 29, 2014	Canberra	Australia	Canberra Royal Theatre	2,417 / 2,436	$385,837
August 31, 2014	Adelaide	Australia	Adelaide Entertainment Centre	3,393 / 3,497	$318,785
September 3, 2014	Sydney	Australia	Sydney State Theatre	6,015 / 6,015	$979,858
September 4, 2014	Sydney	Australia	Sydney State Theatre	6,015 / 6,015	$979,858
September 5, 2014	Sydney	Australia	Sydney State Theatre	6,015 / 6,015	$979,858
September 7, 2014	Sydney	Australia	Sydney Opera House	4,159 / 4,209	$835,509
September 8, 2014	Sydney	Australia	Sydney Opera House	4,159 / 4,209	$835,509
September 10, 2014	Christchurch	New Zealand	Horncastle Arena	4,971 / 5,026	$571,829
North America
October 17, 2014	Seattle	United States	Paramount Theatre	—	—
October 18, 2014	Seattle	United States	Paramount Theatre	—	—
October 19, 2014	Seattle	United States	Paramount Theatre	—	—
October 21, 2014	Portland	United States	Keller Auditorium	—	—
October 24, 2014	Los Angeles	United States	Dolby Theatre	8,748 / 10,398	$844,666
October 25, 2014	Los Angeles	United States	Dolby Theatre	8,748 / 10,398	$844,666
October 26, 2014	Los Angeles	United States	Dolby Theatre	8,748 / 10,398	$844,666
October 28, 2014	Oakland	United States	Paramount Theatre	6,649 / 7,500	$710,396
October 29, 2014	Oakland	United States	Paramount Theatre	6,649 / 7,500	$710,396
October 30, 2014	Oakland	United States	Paramount Theatre	6,649 / 7,500	$710,396
November 1, 2014	Denver	United States	Bellco Theatre	—	—
November 4, 2014	Minneapolis	United States	Orpheum Theatre	7,154 / 7,587	$747,634
November 5, 2014	Minneapolis	United States	Orpheum Theatre	7,154 / 7,587	$747,634
November 6, 2014	Minneapolis	United States	Orpheum Theatre	7,154 / 7,587	$747,634
November 8, 2014	Chicago	United States	Cadillac Palace Theatre	—	—
November 9, 2014	Chicago	United States	Cadillac Palace Theatre	—	—
November 10, 2014	Chicago	United States	Cadillac Palace Theatre	—	—
November 12, 2014	Cleveland	United States	Cleveland State Theatre	—	—
November 14, 2014	Boston	United States	Orpheum Theatre	—	—
November 15, 2014	Providence	United States	Providence Performing Arts Center	—	—
November 17, 2014	Toronto	Canada	Sony Centre for the Performing Arts	—	—
November 18, 2014	Toronto	Canada	Sony Centre for the Performing Arts	—	—
November 20, 2014	Pittsburgh	United States	Heinz Hall for the Performing Arts	—	—
November 21, 2014	Philadelphia	United States	Academy of Music	—	—
November 22, 2014	Philadelphia	United States	Academy of Music	—	—
November 23, 2014	Philadelphia	United States	Academy of Music	—	—
November 25, 2014	Washington, D.C.	United States	DAR Constitution Hall	—	—
November 26, 2014	Newark	United States	Prudential Hall	2,804 / 2,804	$267,058
November 28, 2014	New York City	United States	Beacon Theatre	13,951 / 13,951	$1,511,562
November 29, 2014	New York City	United States	Beacon Theatre	13,951 / 13,951	$1,511,562
December 1, 2014	New York City	United States	Beacon Theatre	13,951 / 13,951	$1,511,562
December 2, 2014	New York City	United States	Beacon Theatre	13,951 / 13,951	$1,511,562
December 3, 2014	New York City	United States	Beacon Theatre	13,951 / 13,951	$1,511,562
Total				86,055 / 93,978 (92%)	$10,365,867

== Reception ==
Dylan's 2014 leg of the Never Ending Tour has been met with almost completely favorable responses and reviews. Many complimenting his quality of shows, now that he has focused on one particular set list.

In Japan Dylan was applauded for his selection and arrangement of the songs in his current set list, with one reviewer for the Japan Times in Tokyo "This [Dylan] is an artist still forever pushing the envelope, with one rendition of a song only rarely the same as any other". In Osaka Dylan's vocal approach and quality were praised and a review called his vocal ability "solid".

When Dylan visited the island of Hawaii straight after a run of concerts in Japan he was praised for "honey coated" vocals and the ability of his backing band. It was also noted how Dylan can make a concert feel "essential" for a fan whilst not particularly engaging with the audience.

Dylan's return to Europe started with two shows in Ireland. At his Dublin concert it was noticed that Dylan still has the ability to attract a crowd of all ages. One reviewer, Aine Byrne, was slightly taken aback by some "unrecognisable" arrangements, the poor sound at the venue and the lack of interaction between Dylan and his audience. However, she stated "[Dylan] may be old and beat up, but the man has some punch in him yet". She also noted that the venue was full and praised the quality of the backing band. "A good concert, not the best, but to see and hear a living legend playing on form was a very pleasant experience indeed". The Irish Mirror also called the concert a "rich theatrical experience". In Bucharest the choice of instruments that the band chose to use to back Dylan were applauded. The show was called "Sometimes tender, sometimes playful and sometimes formidable – but always with venerable composure and poetic dignity". In Vienna it was noted that Dylan is obviously comfortable with the material he is now playing and the order in which songs played was helped the sound and of the concert to create an "authentic theatre experience". In Poland it was noted that Dylan's secondary 'festival' set list featured minimal materiel from the last few albums, the inclusion of a large amount of recent material became standard feature in set lists of recent years. In Kristiansand, the inclusion of "Girl from the North Country" was met with a highly positive response, while the concert itself was deemed average, with on-and-off vocal performances. This kind of report on his vocals lacking the smoothness of earlier in the year continued to the end of the tour.

The opening concert of the Oceania tour in New Zealand was met with the same very favourable reaction that met his tour in Japan. A reviewer from the Waikato Times noted the theatrical edge and stated that "Finally, Dylan and the band closed, leaving in their wake an awestruck audience, a standing ovation and the incomparable feeling of having witnessed a musical great – perhaps not in his prime, but by no means past it". The second concert in Hamilton was met with the same kind of response. It was noted that a collection of microphones and dim lighting obscured the view of Dylan. A review of Dylan's first concert in Australia at Perth's Riverside theatre by the Sydney Morning Herald noted that Dylan showed the Perth audience that he is "still on top of his game". The review made light that "He sang truly. This was as good as perfection, and there were diamonds, and little rust". In Melbourne the show was praised for its intimate feel "It was a night to remember, though maybe not for the exact reasons we had expected. Rather, the aim seemed to be keeping everything as cosy as possible, inviting us to have a glimpse at Dylan's out-of-time universe for a couple of hours. Nothing more, and nothing less". Dylan's main Brisbane show was also met with a positive response. The review also noted the dim lighting "He no longer plays guitar but occasionally piano, and under dim lighting – no doubt to discourage fans from sneaking a video souvenir". Dylan performed a second, more intimate show in Brisbane and The Brisbane Times stated "Dylan was magnificent, backed by a band that switched between musical genres with effortless skill". The positive reviews continued for Dylan's for the Canberra concert; "Looking dapper at 73, Dylan did not disappoint". The Reviews of Sydney's series of concerts were also looked upon favourably, with the Brisbane Times stating "From evangelical to dirty roots, the veteran artist is in superb form". The Oceania tour ended with a third concert in New Zealand. It was noted that although the set list of recent songs would disappoint the fans expecting early material however the review was favourable and noted "but we should be pleased that the creative Dylan has made it back to play his 21st show in New Zealand".
