= Never Ending Tour 2015 =

2015 concert tour by Bob Dylan

- Tour by Bob Dylan
- Poster to the concerts in London, UK
- Location: North America; Europe
- Start date: April 10, 2015
- End date: November 22, 2015
- Legs: 3
- No. of shows: 28 in North America; 59 in Europe; 87 in total

Bob Dylan concert chronology
- Never Ending Tour 2014 (2014); Never Ending Tour 2015 (2015); Never Ending Tour 2016 (2016)

The Never Ending Tour is the popular name for Bob Dylan's endless touring schedule since June 7, 1988. The tour started on April 10, 2015 and ended on November 22, 2015.

== Background ==
The first leg of the tour, taking place solely in North America, was announced on February 12, 2015, with several dates in Memphis, Tulsa, Kansas City and St. Louis being announced in the following days and weeks.

Dylan planned an extensive tour of Europe split between the summer and fall. During the summer Dylan and his band performed mainly at festivals and large arenas. During the fall Dylan and his band performed mainly in theatres and mid-sized arenas, including a five-night residency at the Royal Albert Hall in London. His performances at the Royal Albert Hall were awarded a five-star review from the Financial Times and his performances at the O_{2} Apollo in Manchester were given a four-star rating by the Manchester Evening News.

== Set list ==
This set list is representative of the performance on October 25, 2015 in London, England. It does not represent all concerts for the duration of the tour.

Set One

1. "Things Have Changed"
2. "She Belongs to Me"
3. "Beyond Here Lies Nothin'"
4. "What'll I Do"
5. "Duquesne Whistle"
6. "Melancholy Mood"
7. "Pay in Blood"
8. "I'm a Fool to Want You"
9. "Tangled Up in Blue"

Set Two

10. "High Water (For Charley Patton)"
11. "Why Try to Change Me Now?"
12. "Early Roman Kings"
13. "The Night We Called It a Day"
14. "Spirit on the Water"
15. "Scarlet Town"
16. "All or Nothing at All"
17. "Long and Wasted Years"
18. "Autumn Leaves"

Encore

19. "Blowin' in the Wind"
20. "Love Sick"

Songs performed

The Freewheelin' Bob Dylan

- Blowin' in the Wind
- A Hard Rain's a-Gonna Fall
- Don't Think Twice, It's All Right

Another Side of Bob Dylan

- To Ramona

Bringing It All Back Home

- She Belongs to Me

Highway 61 Revisited

- Ballad of a Thin Man
- Desolation Row

Blonde on Blonde

- Visions of Johanna

John Wesley Harding

- All Along the Watchtower
- I'll Be Your Baby Tonight

Blood on the Tracks

- Tangled Up in Blue
- Simple Twist of Fate
- Shelter from the Storm

The Bootleg Series Volumes 1–3

- Blind Willie McTell

Time Out of Mind

- Love Sick
- 'Til I Fell in Love with You

"Love and Theft"

- Tweedle Dee & Tweedle Dum
- High Water (For Charley Patton)
- Cry A While

Modern Times

- Spirit on the Water
- Workingman Blues #2
- The Levee's Gonna Break

Together Through Life

- Beyond Here Lies Nothin'
- Forgetful Heart
- Jolene

Tempest

- Duquesne Whistle
- Soon After Midnight
- Long and Wasted Years
- Pay in Blood
- Scarlet Town
- Early Roman Kings

Shadows in the Night

- I'm a Fool to Want You
- The Night We Called It a Day
- Stay With Me
- Autumn Leaves
- Why Try to Change Me Now
- Full Moon and Empty Arms
- Where Are You?
- What'll I Do
- That Lucky Old Sun

Fallen Angels

- All or Nothing at All
- Come Rain or Come Shine
- Melancholy Mood

Non-album songs

- Things Have Changed
- Waiting for You

Non-album cover songs

- Sad Songs and Waltzes (Willie Nelson)

== Tour dates ==
Date	City	Country	Venue	Attendance	Box Office
North America
April 10, 2015	Atlantic City	United States	Borgata Events Center	—	—
April 11, 2015	Baltimore	United States	Lyric Opera House	—	—
April 12, 2015	Richmond	United States	Altria Theater	2,907 / 2,907	$226,795
April 14, 2015	Savannah	United States	Johnny Mercer Theater	2,459 / 2,459	$182,949
April 15, 2015	Montgomery	United States	Montgomery Performing Arts Center	1,706 / 1,706	$136,615
April 17, 2015	North Charleston	United States	North Charleston Performing Arts Center	1,677 / 1,821	$140,402
April 18, 2015	St. Augustine	United States	St. Augustine Amphitheatre	3,896 / 3,896	$239,652
April 19, 2015	Orlando	United States	Walt Disney Theater	—	—
April 21, 2015	Clearwater	United States	Ruth Eckerd Hall	2,146 / 2,146	$199,367
April 22, 2015	Fort Lauderdale	United States	Au-Rene Theater	2,628 / 2,628	$222,756
April 24, 2015	Atlanta	United States	Fox Theatre	4,042 / 4,577	$351,107
April 25, 2015	Durham	United States	Durham Performing Arts Center	2,690 / 2,712	$209,281
April 26, 2015	Greenville	United States	Peace Center	—	—
April 27, 2015	Nashville	United States	Andrew Jackson Hall	2,240 / 2,358	$202,100
April 29, 2015	New Orleans	United States	Saenger Theatre	2,591 / 2,591	$210,056
April 30, 2015	Memphis	United States	Orpheum Theatre	2,355 / 2,355	$184,815
May 2, 2015	Thackerville	United States	WinStar World Casino	—	—
May 3, 2015	Oklahoma City	United States	Civic Center Music Hall	—	—
May 5, 2015	Houston	United States	Bayou Music Center	—	—
May 6, 2015	Austin	United States	Bass Concert Hall	—	—
May 7, 2015	San Antonio	United States	Majestic Theatre	2,249 / 2,249	$170,126
May 9, 2015	Tulsa	United States	The Joint	—	—
May 10, 2015	Kansas City	United States	Municipal Auditorium Music Hall	—	—
May 11, 2015	St. Louis	United States	Fox Theatre	—	—
May 13, 2015	Milwaukee	United States	Riverside Theater	2,329 / 2,329	$192,198
May 15, 2015	Detroit	United States	Fox Theatre	—	—
May 16, 2015	Columbus	United States	Ohio Theatre	—	—
May 17, 2015	South Bend	United States	Morris Performing Arts Center	2,032 / 2,513	$159,520
Europe: Summer
June 20, 2015	Mainz	Germany	Zollhafen Mainz	—	—
June 21, 2015	Tübingen	Germany	Kreissparkasse Sparkassen Carré	—	—
June 23, 2015	Bamberg	Germany	Brose Arena Bamberg	—	—
June 25, 2015	Ljubljana	Slovenia	Arena Stožice	—	—
June 26, 2015	Wiesen	Austria	Ottakringer Arena Wiesen	—	—
June 27, 2015	San Daniele	Italy	Stadio Zanussi San Daniele	— (Note: The June 27, 2015 concert in San Daniele del Friuli is a part of Aria di Festa.)	
June 29, 2015	Rome	Italy	Terme di Caracalla	—	—
July 1, 2015	Lucca	Italy	Piazza Napoleone Lucca	— (Note: The July 1, 2015 concert in Lucca is a part of Lucca Summer Festival.)	
July 2, 2015	Turin	Italy	Pala Alpitour	—	—
July 4, 2015	Barcelona	Spain	Palau Reial de Pedralbes	— (Note: The July 4, 2015 concert in Barcelona is a part of Festival Jardins de Pedralbes.)	
July 5, 2015	Zaragoza	Spain	Pabellón Príncipe Felipe	—	—
July 6, 2015	Madrid	Spain	Barclaycard Center	—	—
July 8, 2015	Granada	Spain	Palacio Municipal de Deportes	—	—
July 9, 2015	Córdoba	Spain	Teatro de la Axerquía	—	—
July 11, 2015	San Sebastián	Spain	Donostia Arena 2016	—	—
July 12, 2015	Albi	France	Albi Cathedral	— (Note: The July 12, 2015 concert in Albi is a part of Festival Pause Guitare.)	
July 13, 2015	Saint Malô	France	Théâtre de Verdure	— (Note: The July 13, 2015 concert in Saint Malô is a part of Festival de Poupet.)	
July 15, 2015	Locarno	Switzerland	Piazza Grande Locarno	— (Note: The July 15, 2015 concert in Locarno is a part of Moon and Stars Festival.)	
July 16, 2015	Lörrach	Germany	Marktplatz Lörrach	— (Note: The July 16, 2015 concert in Lörrach is a part of Stimmen-Festival.)	
Europe: Fall
October 1, 2015	Oslo	Norway	Oslo Konserthus	—	—
October 2, 2015	Oslo	Norway	Oslo Konserthus	—	—
October 3, 2015	Oslo	Norway	Oslo Konserthus	—	—
October 5, 2015	Stockholm	Sweden	Waterfront Auditorium	—	—
October 6, 2015	Stockholm	Sweden	Waterfront Auditorium	—	—
October 8, 2015	Copenhagen	Denmark	Falkonersalen	—	—
October 9, 2015	Copenhagen	Denmark	Falkonersalen	—	—
October 10, 2015	Malmö	Sweden	Malmö Live	—	—
October 12, 2015	Leipzig	Germany	Gewandhaus	—	—
October 13, 2015	Berlin	Germany	Tempodrom	—	—
October 14, 2015	Berlin	Germany	Tempodrom	—	—
October 15, 2015	Braunschweig	Germany	Volkswagen Halle	—	—
October 17, 2015	Saarbrücken	Germany	Saarlandhalle	—	—
October 18, 2015	Paris	France	Palais des Sports	—	—
October 19, 2015	Paris	France	Palais des Sports	—	—
October 21, 2015	London	England	Royal Albert Hall	—	—
October 22, 2015	London	England	Royal Albert Hall	—	—
October 23, 2015	London	England	Royal Albert Hall	—	—
October 24, 2015	London	England	Royal Albert Hall	—	—
October 25, 2015	London	England	Royal Albert Hall	—	—
October 27, 2015	Manchester	England	O_{2} Apollo Manchester	—	—
October 28, 2015	Manchester	England	O_{2} Apollo Manchester	—	—
October 29, 2015	Cardiff	Wales	Motorpoint Arena Cardiff	4,728 / 4,820	$434,678
October 30, 2015	Southampton	England	Southampton Guildhall	—	—
November 1, 2015	Brussels	Belgium	Forest National	7,514 / 8,400	$550,417
November 2, 2015	Eindhoven	Netherlands	Muziekgebouw Frits Philips	—	—
November 5, 2015	Amsterdam	Netherlands	Carré Theatre	—	—
November 6, 2015	Amsterdam	Netherlands	Carré Theatre	—	—
November 7, 2015	Amsterdam	Netherlands	Carré Theatre	—	—
November 9, 2015	Hamburg	Germany	Alsterdorfer Sporthalle	—	—
November 10, 2015	Düsseldorf	Germany	Mitsubishi Electric Halle	—	—
November 11, 2015	Regensburg	Germany	Donau Arena	—	—
November 13, 2015	Basel	Switzerland	Musical Theater Basel	—	—
November 14, 2015	Basel	Switzerland	Musical Theater Basel	—	—
November 15, 2015	Bregenz	Austria	Festspielhaus Bregenz	—	—
November 16, 2015	Bregenz	Austria	Festspielhaus Bregenz	—	—
November 18, 2015	Bologna	Italy	Teatro Auditorium Manzoni	—	—
November 19, 2015	Bologna	Italy	Teatro Auditorium Manzoni	—	—
November 21, 2015	Milan	Italy	Teatro degli Arcimboldi	—	—
November 22, 2015	Milan	Italy	Teatro degli Arcimboldi	—	—
Total				50,189 / 52,467 (96%)	$4,012,834

=== Cancellations and rescheduled shows ===
November 3, 2015	Rouen	Zénith de Rouen	Cancelled due to unforeseen logistical issues.
