= Never Ending Tour 2017 =

2017 concert tour by Bob Dylan

- Tour by Bob Dylan
- Poster to the concert in Thackerville, USA
- Location: Europe; North America
- Associated album: Triplicate
- Start date: April 1, 2017
- End date: November 25, 2017
- Legs: 3
- No. of shows: 28 in Europe; 56 in North America; 84 in total

Bob Dylan concert chronology
- Never Ending Tour 2016 (2016); Never Ending Tour 2017 (2017); Never Ending Tour 2018 (2018)

The Never Ending Tour is the popular name for Bob Dylan's endless touring schedule since June 7, 1988. The tour was held to support Dylan's album Triplicate. The tour started on 1 April, 2017 and ended on November 25, 2017.

== Background ==
Six concerts taking place in the United Kingdom, across May 2017 were announced at BobDylan.com on December 8, 2016. The following day a concert at the 3Arena in Dublin was announced for May 11. Further mainland Europe concerts including Stockholm and Antwerp were announced on December 12.

On January 27, 2017, it was announced that Dylan would be performing at the fan-curated Firefly Music Festival, taking place at The Woodlands at Dover International Speedway in Dover, Delaware. On March 20, 2017, a further five concerts in the United States were announced, along with eighteen concerts taking place in Canada during the summer of 2017. These concerts include the first ever concert to take place at The Hutton Brickyards in Kingston, New York and Dylan's first concert appearance at Edmonton's new Rogers Place arena.

== Set list ==
This set list is representative of the performance on July 25, 2017, in Vancouver, British Columbia. It does not represent the set list at all concerts for the duration of the tour.

1. "Things Have Changed"
2. "Don't Think Twice, It's All Right"
3. "Highway 61 Revisited"
4. "Why Try to Change Me Now"
5. "Summer Days"
6. "Make You Feel My Love"
7. "Duquesne Whistle"
8. "Melancholy Mood"
9. "Stormy Weather"
10. "Pay in Blood"
11. "Once Upon a Time"
12. "Tangled Up in Blue"
13. "Early Roman Kings"
14. "Desolation Row"
15. "Soon After Midnight"
16. "That Old Black Magic"
17. "Long and Wasted Years"
18. "Autumn Leaves"

Encore

19. "Blowin' in the Wind"
20. "Ballad of a Thin Man"
Songs performed

The Freewheelin' Bob Dylan

- Blowin' in the Wind
- A Hard Rain's a-Gonna Fall
- Don't Think Twice, It's All Right

Another Side of Bob Dylan

- To Ramona
- It Ain't Me Babe

Bringing It All Back Home

- It's All Over Now, Baby Blue

Highway 61 Revisited

- Ballad of a Thin Man
- Highway 61 Revisited
- Desolation Row

Blood on the Tracks

- Tangled Up in Blue
- Simple Twist of Fate

The Bootleg Series Volumes 1–3 (Rare & Unreleased) 1961–1991

- Blind Willie McTell

Time Out of Mind

- Standing in the Doorway
- Love Sick
- Make You Feel My Love

"Love and Theft"

- Summer Days
- Lonesome Day Blues
- High Water (For Charley Patton)

Modern Times

- Spirit on the Water

Together Through Life

- Beyond Here Lies Nothin'

Tempest

- Duquesne Whistle
- Soon After Midnight
- Long and Wasted Years
- Pay in Blood
- Scarlet Town
- Early Roman Kings

Shadows in the Night

- Autumn Leaves
- Why Try to Change Me Now
- Full Moon and Empty Arms

Fallen Angels

- All or Nothing at All
- Melancholy Mood
- That Old Black Magic

Triplicate

- I Could Have Told You
- Once Upon a Time
- Stormy Weather
- This Nearly Was Mine

Non-album songs

- Things Have Changed

== Tour dates ==
Date	City	Country	Venue	Attendance	Box Office
Europe
April 1, 2017	Stockholm	Sweden	Waterfront Congress Centre	—	—
April 2, 2017	Stockholm	Sweden	Waterfront Congress Centre	—	—
April 4, 2017	Oslo	Norway	Oslo Spektrum	—	—
April 6, 2017	Copenhagen	Denmark	Copenhagen Opera House	—	—
April 7, 2017	Copenhagen	Denmark	Copenhagen Opera House	—	—
April 9, 2017	Lund	Sweden	Sparbanken Skåne Arena	—	—
April 11, 2017	Hamburg	Germany	Barclaycard Arena	7,022 / 8,150	$537,147
April 12, 2017	Lingen	Germany	EmslandArena	—	—
April 13, 2017	Düsseldorf	Germany	Mitsubishi Electric Halle	—	—
April 16, 2017	Amsterdam	Netherlands	AFAS Live	—	—
April 17, 2017	Amsterdam	Netherlands	AFAS Live	—	—
April 18, 2017	Amsterdam	Netherlands	AFAS Live	—	—
April 20, 2017	Paris	France	Zénith Paris	—	—
April 21, 2017	Paris	France	Grande Seine	—	—
April 22, 2017	Esch-sur-Alzette	Luxembourg	Rockhal	—	—
April 24, 2017	Antwerp	Belgium	Lotto Arena	5,146 / 5,580	$457,587
April 25, 2017	Frankfurt	Germany	Festhalle Frankfurt	—	—
April 26, 2017	Hanover	Germany	Swiss Life Hall	—	—
April 28, 2017	London	England	London Palladium	—	—
April 29, 2017	London	England	London Palladium	—	—
April 30, 2017	London	England	London Palladium	—	—
May 3, 2017	Cardiff	Wales	Motorpoint Arena Cardiff	—	—
May 4, 2017	Bournemouth	England	Windsor Hall	—	—
May 5, 2017	Nottingham	England	Motorpoint Arena Nottingham	—	—
May 7, 2017	Glasgow	Scotland	SEC Armadillo	—	—
May 8, 2017	Liverpool	England	Echo Arena Liverpool	—	—
May 9, 2017	London	England	SSE Arena Wembley	—	—
May 11, 2017	Dublin	Ireland	3Arena	—	—
North America (Summer)
June 13, 2017	Port Chester	United States	Capitol Theatre	—	—
June 14, 2017	Port Chester	United States	Capitol Theatre	—	—
June 15, 2017	Port Chester	United States	Capitol Theatre	—	—
June 17, 2017 (Note: The June 17, 2017, concert at The Woodlands of Dover International Speedway in Dover, Delaware, is part of the Firefly Music Festival.)	Dover	United States	The Woodlands of D.I.S.	—	—
June 18, 2017	Wallingford	United States	Toyota Oakdale Theatre	—	—
June 20, 2017	Shelburne	United States	The Green at the Shelburne Museum	3,043 / 3,043	$228,225
June 21, 2017	Providence	United States	Providence Performing Arts Center	—	—
June 23, 2017	Kingston	United States	The Hutton Brickyards	—	—
June 24, 2017	Kingston	United States	The Hutton Brickyards	—	—
June 25, 2017	Syracuse	United States	Lakeview Amphitheater	3,054 / 4,724	$244,931
June 27, 2017	Kingston	Canada	Rogers K-Rock Centre	—	—
June 29, 2017	Ottawa	Canada	Canadian Tire Centre	—	—
June 30, 2017 (Note: The June 30, 2017, concert at Centre Bell in Montreal, Quebec, is part of the Montreal International Jazz Festival.)	Montreal	Canada	Bell Centre	7,330 / 7,330	$470,060
July 2, 2017	Barrie	Canada	Barrie Molson Centre	—	—
July 4, 2017	Oshawa	Canada	Tribute Communities Centre	—	—
July 5, 2017	Toronto	Canada	Air Canada Centre	—	—
July 6, 2017	London	Canada	Budweiser Gardens	4,150 / 4,481	$257,325
July 8, 2017 (Note: The July 8, 2017, concert in Detroit and the July 9, 2017, concert in Milwaukee are part of Willie Nelson's Outlaw Music Festival Tour.)	Detroit	United States	Joe Louis Arena	—	—
July 9, 2017 (Note: The July 9, 2017, concert at the American Family Insurance Amphitheater in Milwaukee, Wisconsin, is part of Summerfest.)	Milwaukee	United States	American Family Insurance Amphitheater	—	—
July 12, 2017	Winnipeg	Canada	Bell MTS Place	—	—
July 14, 2017	Saskatoon	Canada	SaskTel Centre	—	—
July 15, 2017	Moose Jaw	Canada	Mosaic Place	—	—
July 16, 2017	Calgary	Canada	Southern Alberta Jubilee Auditorium	—	—
July 19, 2017	Edmonton	Canada	Rogers Place	—	—
July 21, 2017	Dawson Creek	Canada	EnCana Events Centre	—	—
July 22, 2017	Prince George	Canada	CN Centre	—	—
July 24, 2017	Kelowna	Canada	Prospera Place	—	—
July 25, 2017	Vancouver	Canada	Rogers Arena	—	—
North America (Fall)
October 13, 2017	Valley Center	United States	Harrah's Resort SoCal Events Center	2,105 / 2,220	$302,885
October 14, 2017	Las Vegas	United States	The Chelsea at the Cosmopolitan	—	—
October 17, 2017	Salt Lake City	United States	Delta Performance Hall	—	—
October 18, 2017	Salt Lake City	United States	Delta Performance Hall	—	—
October 21, 2017	Broomfield	United States	1stBank Center	—	—
October 23, 2017	Omaha	United States	CenturyLink Center Omaha	—	—
October 24, 2017	Ames	United States	Stephens Auditorium	—	—
October 25, 2017	St. Paul	United States	Xcel Energy Center	—	—
October 27, 2017	Chicago	United States	Wintrust Arena	4,177 / 7,147	$371,725
October 28, 2017	Grand Rapids	United States	Van Andel Arena	—	—
October 29, 2017	Bloomington	United States	IU Auditorium	—	—
November 1, 2017	Detroit	United States	Fox Theatre	—	—
November 3, 2017	Akron	United States	E.J. Thomas Hall	—	—
November 5, 2017	Columbus	United States	Palace Theatre	—	—
November 6, 2017	Pittsburgh	United States	Heinz Hall	—	—
November 8, 2017	Uniondale	United States	Nassau Veterans Memorial Coliseum	4,195 / 5,514	$255,605
November 10, 2017	Richmond	United States	Richmond Coliseum	2,779 / 4,354	$206,891
November 11, 2017	Upper Darby	United States	Tower Theater	—	—
November 12, 2017	Upper Darby	United States	Tower Theater	—	—
November 14, 2017	Washington, D.C.	United States	The Anthem	4,245 / 4,245	$355,690
November 16, 2017	Boston	United States	Agganis Arena	—	—
November 17, 2017	Albany	United States	Palace Theatre	—	—
November 18, 2017	Buffalo	United States	Shea's Performing Arts Center	—	—
November 20, 2017	New York City	United States	Beacon Theatre	13,806 / 13,806	$1,534,236
November 21, 2017	New York City	United States	Beacon Theatre	13,806 / 13,806	$1,534,236
November 22, 2017	New York City	United States	Beacon Theatre	13,806 / 13,806	$1,534,236
November 24, 2017	New York City	United States	Beacon Theatre	13,806 / 13,806	$1,534,236
November 25, 2017	New York City	United States	Beacon Theatre	13,806 / 13,806	$1,534,236
TOTAL				61,052 / 70,594 (86%)	$5,222,307

=== Cancelled shows ===
July 18, 2017	Medicine Hat	Canalta Centre	Cancelled due to logistical issues.
July 27, 2017	Victoria	Save-On-Foods Memorial Centre	Cancelled due to scheduling issues.

== Personnel ==
- Bob Dylan — Vocals, Piano
- Tony Garnier — Bass Guitar, Double Bass
- Donnie Herron — Pedal Steel, Banjo, Mandolin
- Stu Kimball – Electric Guitar, Acoustic guitar
- George Receli – Drums
- Charlie Sexton — Electric Guitar
