= Never Ending Tour 2018 =

2018 concert tour by Bob Dylan

- Tour by Bob Dylan
- Poster to the concert in Orlando, USA
- Location: Europe; Asia; Oceania; North America
- Start date: March 22, 2018
- End date: December 3, 2018
- Legs: 3
- No. of shows: 26 in Europe; 5 in Asia; 11 in Oceania; 42 in North America; 84 in total

Bob Dylan concert chronology
- Never Ending Tour 2017 (2017); Never Ending Tour 2018 (2018); Never Ending Tour 2019 (2019)

The Never Ending Tour is the popular name for Bob Dylan's endless touring schedule since June 7, 1988. The tour began on March 22, 2018 and concluded on December 3, 2018.

== Background ==
Six concerts taking place in Italy were announced by ticketone.it on November 7, 2017. Further concerts in Portugal, Spain, Switzerland, Germany, Austria and the Czech Republic were released over the following week.

On March 15 it was announced by Billboard that Dylan and his band would be headlining the Fuji Rock Festival in Japan. Almost two months later further dates in Asia were announced along with a tour of Australia and New Zealand. On August 3 a final show in Sydney was scheduled to take place at the Enmore Theatre, his first performance at the venue.

On May 25 a single concert was announced at Thackerville's WinStar World Casino Global Event Center and on August 3 a further four concerts were added to Dylan's Fall touring schedule. A further twenty-three concerts were announced on August 6.

== Set list ==
This set list is representative of the performance on April 16, 2018, in Vienna, Austria. It does not represent the set list at all concerts for the duration of the tour.

1. "Things Have Changed"
2. "Don't Think Twice, It's All Right"
3. "Highway 61 Revisited"
4. "Simple Twist of Fate"
5. "Duquesne Whistle"
6. "Melancholy Mood"
7. "Honest With Me"
8. "Tryin' to Get to Heaven"
9. "Come Rain or Come Shine"
10. "Pay in Blood"
11. "Tangled Up in Blue"
12. "Early Roman Kings"
13. "Desolation Row"
14. "Love Sick"
15. "Autumn Leaves"
16. "Thunder on the Mountain"
17. "Soon After Midnight"
18. "Long and Wasted Years"

Encore

19. "Blowin' in the Wind"
20. "Ballad of a Thin Man"
Songs performed

The Freewheelin' Bob Dylan

- Blowin' in the Wind
- Don't Think Twice, It's All Right

Another Side of Bob Dylan

- It Ain't Me Babe

Highway 61 Revisited

- Like a Rolling Stone
- Ballad of a Thin Man
- It Takes a Lot to Laugh, It Takes a Train to Cry
- Highway 61 Revisited
- Desolation Row

Blonde on Blonde

- Visions of Johanna

John Wesley Harding

- All Along the Watchtower

Blood on the Tracks

- Tangled Up in Blue
- Simple Twist of Fate

Slow Train Coming

- Gotta Serve Somebody

Time Out of Mind

- Love Sick
- Tryin' to Get to Heaven
- Make You Feel My Love

"Love and Theft"

- Summer Days
- High Water (For Charley Patton)
- Honest with Me
- Cry A While

Modern Times

- Thunder on the Mountain
- Spirit on the Water
- Workingman's Blues #2

Tempest

- Duquesne Whistle
- Soon After Midnight
- Long and Wasted Years
- Pay in Blood
- Early Roman Kings
- Scarlet Town

Shadows in the Night

- Autumn Leaves
- Why Try to Change Me Now
- Full Moon and Empty Arms

Fallen Angels

- Melancholy Mood
- Come Rain or Come Shine

Triplicate

- The September of My Years
- Once Upon a Time

Non-album songs

- Things Have Changed
- When I Paint My Masterpiece
- It's a Man's World
- San-Hoz-Say
- Moon River

== Tour dates ==
Date	City	Country	Venue	Attendance	Box Office
Europe
March 22, 2018	Lisbon	Portugal	Altice Arena	—	—
March 24, 2018	Salamanca	Spain	Pabellón Multiusos Sánchez Paraíso	—	—
March 26, 2018	Madrid	Spain	Sala Sinfónica	—	—
March 27, 2018	Madrid	Spain	Sala Sinfónica	—	—
March 28, 2018	Madrid	Spain	Sala Sinfónica	—	—
March 30, 2018	Barcelona	Spain	Gran Teatre del Liceu	—	—
March 31, 2018	Barcelona	Spain	Gran Teatre del Liceu	—	—
April 3, 2018	Rome	Italy	Auditorium Parco della Musica	—	—
April 4, 2018	Rome	Italy	Auditorium Parco della Musica	—	—
April 5, 2018	Rome	Italy	Auditorium Parco della Musica	—	—
April 7, 2018	Florence	Italy	Nelson Mandela Forum	—	—
April 8, 2018	Mantua	Italy	PalaBam	—	—
April 9, 2018	Milan	Italy	Teatro degli Arcimboldi	—	—
April 11, 2018	Zürich	Switzerland	Hallenstadion	5,685 / 5,685	$720,269
April 12, 2018	Neu-Ulm	Germany	Ratiopharm Arena	—	—
April 13, 2018	Salzburg	Austria	Salzburgarena	—	—
April 15, 2018	Brno	Czech Republic	Hala Vodova	—	—
April 16, 2018	Vienna	Austria	Wiener Stadthalle	—	—
April 18, 2018	Leipzig	Germany	Arena Leipzig	—	—
April 19, 2018	Krefeld	Germany	König Palast	—	—
April 21, 2018	Bielefeld	Germany	Seidensticker Halle	—	—
April 22, 2018	Nuremberg	Germany	Frankenhalle	—	—
April 23, 2018	Baden-Baden	Germany	Festspielhaus Baden-Baden	—	—
April 25, 2018	Genoa	Italy	RDS Stadium	—	—
April 26, 2018	Lido di Jesolo	Italy	Pala Arrex	—	—
April 27, 2018	Verona	Italy	Verona Arena	—	—
Asia
July 27, 2018	Seoul	South Korea	Olympic Gymnastics Arena	—	—
July 29, 2018 (Note: The July 29, 2018 concert in Yuzawa is part of Fuji Rock Festival.)	Yuzawa	Japan	Naeba Ski Resort	—	—
August 2, 2018	Taipei	Taiwan	Taipei International Convention Center	—	—
August 4, 2018	Wan Chai	Hong Kong	HKCEC Hall 5BC	—	—
August 6, 2018	Dover	Singapore	The Star Theatre	—	—
Oceania
August 8, 2018	Perth	Australia	Perth Arena	5,176 / 5,376	$587,136
August 11, 2018 (Note: The August 11, 2018 concert in Adelaide was originally scheduled to take place at the Adelaide Botanic Park however was moved to Bonython Park due to Production Logistics.)	Adelaide	Australia	Bonython Park	—	—
August 13, 2018	Melbourne	Australia	Margaret Court Arena	—	—
August 14, 2018	Melbourne	Australia	Margaret Court Arena	—	—
August 18, 2018	Sydney	Australia	ICC Sydney Theatre	—	—
August 19, 2018	Sydney	Australia	Enmore Theatre	—	—
August 20, 2018	Wollongong	Australia	WIN Entertainment Centre	—	—
August 22, 2018	Newcastle	Australia	Newcastle Entertainment Centre	—	—
August 24, 2018	Brisbane	Australia	Brisbane Entertainment Centre	—	—
August 26, 2018	Auckland	New Zealand	Spark Arena	—	—
August 28, 2018	Christchurch	New Zealand	Horncastle Arena	—	—
North America
October 4, 2018	Phoenix	United States	Comerica Theatre	—	—
October 5, 2018	Tucson	United States	Tucson Music Hall	—	—
October 7, 2018	Albuquerque	United States	Kiva Auditorium	—	—
October 9, 2018	Midland	United States	Wagner Noël Performing Arts Center	—	—
October 10, 2018	Irving	United States	Toyota Music Factory	—	—
October 12, 2018	Tulsa	United States	River Spirit Casino	—	—
October 13, 2018	Thackerville	United States	Global Event Center	—	—
October 14, 2018	Sugar Land	United States	Smart Financial Centre	—	—
October 16, 2018	Lafayette	United States	Heymann Performing Arts Center	—	—
October 17, 2018	Mobile	United States	Saenger Theatre	—	—
October 19, 2018	St. Augustine	United States	St. Augustine Amphitheatre	—	—
October 20, 2018	Clearwater	United States	Ruth Eckerd Hall	—	—
October 21, 2018	Sarasota	United States	Van Wezel Performing Arts Hall	—	—
October 23, 2018	Fort Myers	United States	Barbara B. Mann Performing Arts Hall	—	—
October 24, 2018	Fort Lauderdale	United States	Au-Rene Theater	—	—
October 26, 2018	Orlando	United States	Walt Disney Theater	—	—
October 27, 2018	Macon	United States	Macon City Auditorium	—	—
October 28, 2018	Chattanooga	United States	Tivoli Theatre	—	—
October 30, 2018	Huntsville	United States	Mark C. Smith Concert Hall	—	—
October 31, 2018	Knoxville	United States	Tennessee Theatre	—	—
November 2, 2018	Asheville	United States	Thomas Wolfe Auditorium	—	—
November 3, 2018	Durham	United States	Durham Performing Arts Center	2,688 / 2,704	$244,267
November 4, 2018	North Charleston	United States	North Charleston Performing Arts Center	—	—
November 6, 2018	Savannah	United States	Johnny Mercer Theater	—	—
November 7, 2018	Augusta	United States	The Bell Auditorium	—	—
November 9, 2018	Charlotte	United States	Ovens Auditorium	2,409 / 2,447	$228,527
November 10, 2018	Roanoke	United States	Berglund Performing Arts Theatre	1,463 / 1,953	$146,113
November 11, 2018	Richmond	United States	EKU Center for the Arts	—	—
November 13, 2018	Youngstown	United States	Covelli Centre	—	—
November 14, 2018	Rochester	United States	Auditorium Theatre	—	—
November 15, 2018	Utica	United States	Stanley Theater	—	—
November 17, 2018	Atlantic City	United States	Etess Arena	—	—
November 18, 2018	Springfield	United States	Symphony Hall	—	—
November 20, 2018	Waterbury	United States	Palace Theatre	—	—
November 23, 2018	New York City	United States	Beacon Theatre	19,402 / 19,402	$2,181,154
November 24, 2018	New York City	United States	Beacon Theatre	19,402 / 19,402	$2,181,154
November 26, 2018	New York City	United States	Beacon Theatre	19,402 / 19,402	$2,181,154
November 27, 2018	New York City	United States	Beacon Theatre	19,402 / 19,402	$2,181,154
November 29, 2018	New York City	United States	Beacon Theatre	19,402 / 19,402	$2,181,154
November 30, 2018	New York City	United States	Beacon Theatre	19,402 / 19,402	$2,181,154
December 1, 2018	New York City	United States	Beacon Theatre	19,402 / 19,402	$2,181,154
December 3, 2018	Philadelphia	United States	Metropolitan Opera House	—	—
TOTAL				36,823 / 37,567 (98%)	$4,107,466
