= Never Ending Tour 2016 =

2016 concert tour by Bob Dylan

- Tour by Bob Dylan
- Poster to the concert in Morrison, USA
- Location: Asia; North America
- Start date: April 4, 2016
- End date: November 23, 2016
- Legs: 3
- No. of shows: 16 in Asia; 59 in North America; 75 in total

Bob Dylan concert chronology
- Never Ending Tour 2015 (2015); Never Ending Tour 2016 (2016); Never Ending Tour 2017 (2017)

The Never Ending Tour is the popular name for Bob Dylan's endless touring schedule since June 7, 1988. The tour started on April 4, 2016 and ended on November 23, 2016.

== Background ==
Bob Dylan's eighth tour of Japan was announced via his official website on December 22, 2015. The tour was slated to take place throughout April covering several major Japanese cities including Tokyo and Osaka.

On March 22, 2016, it was announced that Dylan, among others, would headline the Ravinia Festival in Highland Park, Illinois, during the summer. A full U.S. summer tour was announced on Dylan's official website on March 7, 2016, beginning in Woodinville, Washington, on June 4 and ending in Guilford, New Hampshire, on July 17, in support of Dylan's upcoming album Fallen Angels.

On May 3, 2016, it was officially confirmed that Dylan, with his band, would perform at Desert Trip, a festival at the Empire Polo Club in Indio, California, featuring performers from the 1960s and 1970s. Dylan was to share the bill with The Rolling Stones, Paul McCartney, Neil Young, Roger Waters and The Who. Following the two Desert Trip performances, Dylan and his band will embark on a complete twenty-seven date tour, throughout the Eastern, Southern and Western United States; this was announced via Dylan's official website on August 8, 2016.

The 2016 tour comprises seventy-five concerts, the fewest concerts Dylan has performed in a year since the Never Ending Tour's début in 1988, when he also performed seventy-five concerts.

== Support acts ==
- Mavis Staples: North America (June 4 – July 17, 2016)

== Set list ==
This set list is representative of the performance on November 23, 2016 at the Au-Rene Theater in Fort Lauderdale, Florida. It does not represent the set list at all concerts for the duration of the tour.

1. "Things Have Changed"
2. "Don't Think Twice, It's All Right"
3. "Highway 61 Revisited"
4. "Beyond Here Lies Nothin'"
5. "Full Moon and Empty Arms"
6. "High Water (For Charley Patton)"
7. "Melancholy Mood"
8. "Duquesne Whistle"
9. "Love Sick"
10. "Tangled Up in Blue"
11. "Pay in Blood"
12. "Why Try to Change Me Now"
13. "Scarlet Town"
14. "I Could Have Told You"
15. "Desolation Row"
16. "Soon After Midnight"
17. "All or Nothing at All"
18. "Long and Wasted Years"
19. "Autumn Leaves"

Encore

20. "Blowin' in the Wind"
21. "Stay With Me"

Desert Trip set lists

October 7

1. "Rainy Day Women ♯12 & 35"
2. "Don't Think Twice, It's All Right"
3. "Highway 61 Revisited"
4. "It's All Over Now, Baby Blue"
5. "High Water (For Charley Patton)"
6. "Simple Twist of Fate"
7. "Early Roman Kings"
8. "Love Sick"
9. "Tangled Up in Blue"
10. "Lonesome Day Blues"
11. "Make You Feel My Love"
12. "Pay in Blood"
13. "Desolation Row"
14. "Soon after Midnight"
15. "Ballad of a Thin Man"

Encore

16. "Masters of War"

October 14

1. "Rainy Day Women ♯12 & 35"
2. "Don't Think Twice, It's All Right"
3. "Highway 61 Revisited"
4. "It's All Over Now, Baby Blue"
5. "High Water (For Charley Patton)"
6. "Simple Twist of Fate"
7. "Early Roman Kings"
8. "Love Sick"
9. "Tangled Up in Blue"
10. "Lonesome Day Blues"
11. "Make You Feel My Love"
12. "Pay in Blood"
13. "Desolation Row"
14. "Soon after Midnight"
15. "Ballad of a Thin Man"

Encore

16. "Like a Rolling Stone"
17. "Why Try to Change Me Now"

Songs performed

The Freewheelin' Bob Dylan

- Blowin' in the Wind
- Masters of War
- Don't Think Twice, It's All Right

Bringing It All Back Home

- She Belongs to Me
- It's All Over Now, Baby Blue

Highway 61 Revisited

- Like a Rolling Stone
- Ballad of a Thin Man
- Highway 61 Revisited
- Desolation Row

Blonde on Blonde

- Rainy Day Women ♯12 & 35

Blood on the Tracks

- Tangled Up in Blue
- Simple Twist of Fate

Time Out of Mind

- Love Sick
- Make You Feel My Love

"Love and Theft"

- Lonesome Day Blues
- High Water (For Charley Patton)

Modern Times

- Spirit on the Water

Together Through Life

- Beyond Here Lies Nothin'

Tempest

- Duquesne Whistle
- Soon after Midnight
- Long and Wasted Years
- Pay in Blood
- Scarlet Town
- Early Roman Kings

Shadows in the Night

- I'm a Fool to Want You
- The Night We Called It a Day
- Stay With Me
- Autumn Leaves
- Why Try to Change Me Now
- Full Moon and Empty Arms
- What'll I Do
- That Lucky Old Sun

Fallen Angels

- All or Nothing at All
- Melancholy Mood
- That Old Black Magic

Non-album songs

- Things Have Changed

Non-album cover songs

- I Could Have Told You (Carl Sigman, Jimmy Van Heusen)
- Free Bird [Short Instrumental] (Allen Collins, Ronnie Van Zant)
- How Deep Is the Ocean? (Irving Berlin)
- That Old Feeling (Sammy Fain, Lew Brown)

== Tour dates ==
Date	City	Country	Venue	Attendance	Box Office
Asia
April 4, 2016	Tokyo	Japan	Orchard Hall	—	—
April 5, 2016	Tokyo	Japan	Orchard Hall	—	—
April 6, 2016	Tokyo	Japan	Orchard Hall	—	—
April 9, 2016	Sendai	Japan	Tokyo Electron Hall Miyagi	—	—
April 11, 2016	Osaka	Japan	Festival Hall, Osaka	—	—
April 12, 2016	Osaka	Japan	Festival Hall, Osaka	—	—
April 13, 2016	Osaka	Japan	Festival Hall, Osaka	—	—
April 15, 2016	Nagoya	Japan	Century Hall	—	—
April 18, 2016	Tokyo	Japan	Orchard Hall	—	—
April 19, 2016	Tokyo	Japan	Orchard Hall	—	—
April 21, 2016	Tokyo	Japan	Orchard Hall	—	—
April 22, 2016	Tokyo	Japan	Orchard Hall	—	—
April 23, 2016	Tokyo	Japan	Tokyo Dome City Hall	—	—
April 25, 2016	Tokyo	Japan	Orchard Hall	—	—
April 26, 2016	Tokyo	Japan	Orchard Hall	—	—
April 28, 2016	Yokohama	Japan	Pacifico Yokohama	—	—
Fallen Angels Tour
June 4, 2016	Woodinville	United States	Chateau Ste. Michelle	8,581 / 8,600	$675,491
June 5, 2016	Woodinville	United States	Chateau Ste. Michelle	8,581 / 8,600	$675,491
June 7, 2016	Eugene	United States	Cuthbert Amphitheater	—	—
June 9, 2016	Berkeley	United States	Hearst Greek Theatre	9,730 / 12,054	$914,970
June 10, 2016	Berkeley	United States	Hearst Greek Theatre	9,730 / 12,054	$914,970
June 11, 2016	Santa Barbara	United States	Santa Barbara Bowl	—	—
June 13, 2016	San Diego	United States	Humphreys Concerts By the Bay	—	—
June 14, 2016	San Diego	United States	Humphreys Concerts By the Bay	—	—
June 16, 2016	Los Angeles	United States	Shrine Auditorium	6,354 / 6,354	$676,071
June 19, 2016	Morrison	United States	Red Rocks Amphitheatre	—	—
June 21, 2016	Kansas City	United States	Starlight Theatre	—	—
June 22, 2016	Lincoln	United States	Pinewood Bowl Theater	—	—
June 24, 2016	Highland Park	United States	Ravinia Park	— (Note: The June 24, 2016 concert at the Ravinia Park in Highland Park, Illinois is part of the Ravinia Festival.)	
June 25, 2016	Indianapolis	United States	Farm Bureau Insurance Lawn	—	—
June 26, 2016	Nashville	United States	Carl Black Chevy Woods Amphitheater	—	—
June 28, 2016	Kettering	United States	Fraze Pavilion	—	—
June 29, 2016	Toledo	United States	Toledo Zoo Amphitheater	—	—
June 30, 2016	Lewiston	United States	Lewiston Artpark	—	—
July 2, 2016	Lenox	United States	Koussevitzky Music Shed	—	—
July 3, 2016	Ledyard	United States	The Grand Theater	—	—
July 5, 2016	Vienna	United States	Filene Center	—	—
July 6, 2016	Vienna	United States	Filene Center	—	—
July 8, 2016	New York City	United States	Forest Hills Stadium	12,013 / 12,013	$1,187,995
July 9, 2016	Bethlehem	United States	Sands Bethlehem Events Center	—	—
July 10, 2016	Atlantic City	United States	The Borgata Events Center	—	—
July 12, 2016	Hopewell	United States	Constellation Brands Marvin Sands PAC	—	—
July 13, 2016	Philadelphia	United States	Mann Center for the Performing Arts	—	—
July 14, 2016	Boston	United States	Leader Bank Pavilion	4,208 / 5,165	$376,448
July 16, 2016	Portland	United States	Thompson's Point	—	—
July 17, 2016	Gilford	United States	Bank of New Hampshire Pavilion	—	—
North America
October 7, 2016	Indio	United States	Empire Polo Club	— (Note: The October 7 and 14, 2016 concerts at the Empire Polo Club in Indio, California are part of Desert Trip.)	
October 13, 2016	Las Vegas	United States	The Chelsea at the Cosmopolitan	—	—
October 14, 2016	Indio	United States	Empire Polo Club	—	
October 16, 2016	Phoenix	United States	Comerica Theatre	—	—
October 18, 2016	Albuquerque	United States	Kiva Auditorium	—	—
October 19, 2016	El Paso	United States	Abraham Chavez Theatre	—	—
October 22, 2016	Thackerville	United States	Global Events Centre	—	—
October 23, 2016	Tulsa	United States	Brady Theater	2,369 / 2,707	$218,210
October 25, 2016	Shreveport	United States	Shreveport Municipal Memorial Auditorium	—	—
October 26, 2016	Baton Rouge	United States	River Center Theater for Performing Arts	—	—
October 27, 2016	Jackson	United States	Thalia Mara Hall	—	—
October 29, 2016	Huntsville	United States	Von Braun Center Concert Hall	—	—
October 30, 2016	Paducah	United States	The Carson Center	—	—
November 1, 2016	Louisville	United States	Robert S. Whitney Hall	2,399 / 2,399	$173,182
November 2, 2016	Charleston	United States	Maier Foundation Performance Hall	—	—
November 4, 2016	Durham	United States	Durham Performing Arts Center	2,701 / 2,701	$237,884
November 5, 2016	Roanoke	United States	Berglund Performing Arts Theatre	—	—
November 6, 2016	Charlotte	United States	Belk Theater	2,118 / 2,118	$192,735
November 9, 2016	Knoxville	United States	Tennessee Theatre	—	—
November 10, 2016	Columbia	United States	Columbia Township Auditorium	2,806 / 2,806	$216,862
November 12, 2016	Asheville	United States	Thomas Wolfe Auditorium	—	—
November 13, 2016	Chattanooga	United States	Tivoli Theatre	—	—
November 15, 2016	Birmingham	United States	BJCC Concert Hall	—	—
November 16, 2016	Mobile	United States	Saenger Theatre	1,940 / 1,940	$168,809
November 18, 2016	Jacksonville	United States	Moran Theater	—	—
November 19, 2016	Clearwater	United States	Ruth Eckerd Hall	2,122 / 2,122	$254,001
November 20, 2016	Fort Myers	United States	Barbara B. Mann Performing Arts Hall	—	—
November 22, 2016	Orlando	United States	Walt Disney Theater	—	—
November 23, 2016	Fort Lauderdale	United States	Au-Rene Theater	—	—
TOTAL				57,331 / 60,969 (94%)	$5,292,658

=== Cancellations and rescheduled shows ===
October 20, 2016	Lubbock	City Bank Auditorium	Cancelled due to logistical issues.

== Personnel ==
- Bob Dylan – Vocals, Piano, Harmonica, Guitar
- Tony Garnier – Electric bass, Double bass
- Donnie Herron – Lap steel, Pedal steel, Banjo, Mandolin
- Stu Kimball – Rhythm guitar
- George Receli – Drums, Percussion
- Charlie Sexton – Lead guitar
