= Never Ending Tour 2019 =

2019 concert tour by Bob Dylan

- Tour by Bob Dylan
- Poster with the USA tour program
- Location: Europe; North America
- Start date: March 31, 2019
- End date: December 8, 2019
- Legs: 3
- No. of shows: 38 in Europe; 39 in North America; 77 in total

Bob Dylan concert chronology
- Never Ending Tour 2018 (2018); Never Ending Tour 2019 (2019); Rough and Rowdy Ways World Wide Tour (2021–26)

The Never Ending Tour is the popular name for Bob Dylan's endless touring schedule since June 7, 1988. The tour began on 31 March, 2019 and concluded on 8 December, 2019.

== Background ==
The first concert of 2019 was announced on November 27, 2018. Taking place in Hyde Park, London, Dylan and his band appeared alongside Neil Young and Promise of the Real. The event was originally scheduled to be part of the British Summer Time concert series. However Barclaycard's sponsorship of the event was removed at Young's insistence. Also on November 27, concerts in Finland, Sweden and Norway were confirmed by local news outlets.

On April 16 in Vienna Dylan spoke to the audience for the first time in over three years. He aborted "Blowin' in the Wind" before addressing an audience member taking photographs. He stated: "Take pictures or don’t take pictures. We can either play or we can pose. Okay?"

The concert on April 19 in Innsbruck was the 3,000th show of the Never Ending Tour.

At the concert in Nowlan Park, Ireland, Dylan performed a duet of the song "Will the Circle Be Unbroken?" with Neil Young.

A twenty-six date tour of North America was announced on September 9, 2019. These shows were mainly scheduled for College and University venues with Dylan also returning to the Met Philadelphia for the second year running. On September 23, a ten-date residency was announced for New York City's Beacon Theatre starting on November 23 and coming to an end on December 6, 2019.

On October 11, the first show of the North American leg of the tour, Dylan introduced two new members of the touring band: drummer Matt Chamberlain, replacing George Receli, and additional guitarist Bob Britt, who had previously played on Time Out of Mind. The tour received extremely positive reviews with several critics describing the shows, and Dylan's singing in particular, as his best in years.

== Set list ==
This set list is representative of the performance on April 4, 2019 in Berlin, Germany. It does not represent the set list at all concerts for the duration of the tour.

1. "Things Have Changed"
2. "It Ain't Me Babe"
3. "Highway 61 Revisited"
4. "Simple Twist of Fate"
5. "Cry A While"
6. "When I Paint My Masterpiece"
7. "Honest with Me"
8. "Tryin' to Get to Heaven"
9. "Scarlet Town"
10. "Make You Feel My Love"
11. "Pay in Blood"
12. "Like a Rolling Stone"
13. "Early Roman Kings"
14. "Don't Think Twice, It's All Right"
15. "Love Sick"
16. "Thunder on the Mountain"
17. "Soon After Midnight"
18. "Gotta Serve Somebody"

Encore

19. "Blowin' in the Wind"
20. "It Takes a Lot to Laugh, It Takes a Train to Cry"
Songs performed

The Freewheelin' Bob Dylan

- "Blowin' in the Wind"
- "Girl from the North Country"
- "Don't Think Twice, It's All Right"

The Times They Are a-Changin'

- "Boots of Spanish Leather"

Another Side of Bob Dylan

- "It Ain't Me Babe"

Bringing It All Back Home

- "It's All Over Now, Baby Blue"

Highway 61 Revisited

- "Like a Rolling Stone"
- "It Takes a Lot to Laugh, It Takes a Train to Cry"
- "Ballad of a Thin Man"
- "Just Like Tom Thumb's Blues"

Bob Dylan's Greatest Hits Vol. II

- "When I Paint My Masterpiece"

Blood on the Tracks

- "Simple Twist of Fate"

Slow Train Coming

- "Gotta Serve Somebody"

Shot of Love

- "Lenny Bruce"

Bob Dylan's Greatest Hits Volume 3

- "Dignity"

Time Out of Mind

- "Love Sick"
- "Tryin' to Get to Heaven"
- "Not Dark Yet"
- "Make You Feel My Love"
- "Can't Wait"

"Love and Theft"

- "Honest with Me"
- "Cry A While"

Modern Times

- "Thunder on the Mountain"

Together Through Life

- "Beyond Here Lies Nothin'"

Tempest (Bob Dylan album)

- "Soon After Midnight"
- "Long and Wasted Years"
- "Pay in Blood"
- "Scarlet Town"
- "Early Roman Kings"

The Bootleg Series Vol. 11: The Basement Tapes Complete

- "Will the Circle Be Unbroken?"

Non-album songs

- "Things Have Changed"

== Tour dates ==
Date	City	Country	Venue	Attendance	Box Office
Europe
March 31, 2019	Düsseldorf	Germany	Mitsubishi Electric Halle	—	—
April 2, 2019	Würzburg	Germany	s.Oliver Arena	—	—
April 4, 2019	Berlin	Germany	Mercedes-Benz Arena	6,800 / 7,520	$576,599
April 5, 2019	Magdeburg	Germany	GETEC Arena	—	—
April 7, 2019	Prague	Czech Republic	Lucerna Great Hall	—	—
April 8, 2019	Prague	Czech Republic	Lucerna Great Hall	—	—
April 9, 2019	Prague	Czech Republic	Lucerna Great Hall	—	—
April 11, 2019	Paris	France	Grand Rex	—	—
April 12, 2019	Paris	France	Grand Rex	—	—
April 13, 2019	Paris	France	Grand Rex	—	—
April 16, 2019	Vienna	Austria	Konzerthaus	—	—
April 17, 2019	Vienna	Austria	Konzerthaus	—	—
April 19, 2019	Innsbruck	Austria	Olympiahalle	—	—
April 20, 2019	Augsburg	Germany	Schwabenhalle	—	—
April 22, 2019	Locarno	Switzerland	Palexpo Locarno	—	—
April 25, 2019	Pamplona	Spain	Navarra Arena	—	—
April 26, 2019	Bilbao	Spain	Bizkaia Arena	—	—
April 28, 2019	Gijón	Spain	Palacio de Deportes de Gijon	—	—
April 29, 2019	Santiago	Spain	Pavillón Multiusos Fontes do Sar	—	—
May 1, 2019	Porto	Portugal	Coliseu do Porto	—	—
May 3, 2019	Seville	Spain	Fibes Sevilla Auditorio	—	—
May 4, 2019	Málaga	Spain	Marenostrum Castle Park	—	—
May 5, 2019	Murcia	Spain	Plaza de Toros de Murcia	—	—
May 7, 2019	Valencia	Spain	Plaza de Toros de Valencia	—	—
June 21, 2019	Bergen	Norway	Koengen	—	—
June 24, 2019	Helsinki	Finland	Hartwall Arena	—	—
June 26, 2019	Stockholm	Sweden	Ericsson Globe	—	—
June 28, 2019	Gothenburg	Sweden	Scandinavium	—	—
June 29, 2019	Oslo	Norway	Oslo Spektrum	—	—
June 30, 2019	Karlstad	Sweden	Karlstad CCC	—	—
July 3, 2019 (Note: The July 3, 2019 concert in Roskilde is part of the Roskilde Festival.)	Roskilde	Denmark	Darupvej	—	—
July 5, 2019	Hamburg	Germany	Barclaycard Arena	—	—
July 6, 2019	Braunschweig	Germany	Volkswagen Halle	—	—
July 7, 2019	Mainz	Germany	Volkspark	—	—
July 9, 2019	Erfurt	Germany	Messe Erfurt	—	—
July 10, 2019 (Note: The July 10, 2019 concert in Stuttgart was part of the Jazzopen Stuttgart.)	Stuttgart	Germany	Schlossplatz	—	—
July 12, 2019 (Note: The July 12 concert in London and the July 14, 2019 concert in Kilkenny were co-headlining concerts with Neil Young and Promise of the Real.)	London	England	Hyde Park	—	—
July 14, 2019	Kilkenny	Ireland	Nowlan Park	—	—
North America
October 11, 2019	Irvine	United States	Bren Events Center	—	—
October 12, 2019	Santa Barbara	United States	Santa Barbara Bowl	—	—
October 14, 2019	Palo Alto	United States	Frost Amphitheater	—	—
October 17, 2019	Denver	United States	Mission Ballroom	—	—
October 19, 2019	Lincoln	United States	Pinnacle Bank Arena	—	—
October 20, 2019	Kansas City	United States	Arvest Bank Theatre at the Midland	—	—
October 22, 2019	St. Louis	United States	Stifel Theatre	—	—
October 23, 2019	Ames	United States	Stephens Auditorium	—	—
October 24, 2019	Mankato	United States	Mankato Civic Center	—	—
October 26, 2019	Milwaukee	United States	Eagles Ballroom	—	—
October 27, 2019	Bloomington	United States	Indiana University Auditorium	—	—
October 29, 2019	Normal	United States	Braden Auditorium	—	—
October 30, 2019	Chicago	United States	Credit Union 1 Arena	—	—
November 1, 2019	South Bend	United States	Morris Performing Arts Center	—	—
November 2, 2019	Muncie	United States	Emens Auditorium	—	—
November 4, 2019	Columbus	United States	Mershon Auditorium	—	—
November 5, 2019	East Lansing	United States	Wharton Center for the Performing Arts	—	—
November 6, 2019	Ann Arbor	United States	Hill Auditorium	—	—
November 8, 2019	Highland Heights	United States	BB&T Arena	—	—
November 9, 2019	Akron	United States	E. J. Thomas Hall	—	—
November 10, 2019	Moon	United States	UPMC Events Center	—	—
November 12, 2019	Baltimore	United States	UMBC Event Center	—	—
November 13, 2019	Petersburg	United States	VSU Multipurpose Center	—	—
November 15, 2019	University Park	United States	Eisenhower Auditorium	—	—
November 17, 2019	Ithaca	United States	IC Athletics and Events Center	—	—
November 19, 2019	Lowell	United States	Tsongas Center	—	—
November 20, 2019	Providence	United States	Providence Performing Arts Center	—	—
November 21, 2019	Philadelphia	United States	The Met Philadelphia	—	—
November 23, 2019	New York City	United States	Beacon Theatre	27,198 / 27,474	$2,942,740
November 24, 2019	New York City	United States	Beacon Theatre	27,198 / 27,474	$2,942,740
November 26, 2019	New York City	United States	Beacon Theatre	27,198 / 27,474	$2,942,740
November 27, 2019	New York City	United States	Beacon Theatre	27,198 / 27,474	$2,942,740
November 29, 2019	New York City	United States	Beacon Theatre	27,198 / 27,474	$2,942,740
November 30, 2019	New York City	United States	Beacon Theatre	27,198 / 27,474	$2,942,740
December 2, 2019	New York City	United States	Beacon Theatre	27,198 / 27,474	$2,942,740
December 3, 2019	New York City	United States	Beacon Theatre	27,198 / 27,474	$2,942,740
December 5, 2019	New York City	United States	Beacon Theatre	27,198 / 27,474	$2,942,740
December 6, 2019	New York City	United States	Beacon Theatre	27,198 / 27,474	$2,942,740
December 8, 2019	Washington, D.C.	United States	The Anthem	—	—
Total				33,998 / 34,994 (97%)	$3,519,339
