= Tin Angel (Bob Dylan song) =

Song by Bob Dylan

from the album Tempest
- Released: September 10, 2012
- Studio: Groove Masters (Santa Monica)
- Genre: Folk
- Length: 9:07
- Label: Columbia
- Songwriter: Bob Dylan
- Producer: Jack Frost

Tempest track listing
- 10 tracks: 1. "Duquesne Whistle"; 2. "Soon After Midnight"; 3. "Narrow Way"; 4. "Long and Wasted Years"; 5. "Pay in Blood"; 6. "Scarlet Town"; 7. "Early Roman Kings"; 8. "Tin Angel"; 9. "Tempest"; 10. "Roll on John"

"Tin Angel" is a song by American singer-songwriter Bob Dylan. It was released on his thirty-fifth studio album Tempest (2012). Written and produced (under the pseudonym "Jack Frost") by Dylan, it was recorded, along with the rest of the album, at Jackson Browne's Groove Masters studio in Santa Monica, California. At over nine minutes, it is the second-longest track on the album, and has been noted both for its lyrical complexity and musical simplicity. It has received positive reviews from critics for its narrative intricacy and dark theming.

== Overview ==
John Burns of PopMatters describes "Tin Angel" as a "complex melodrama analyzing death, loyalty, and betrayal within a twisted narrative", which he compares to "Lily, Rosemary and the Jack of Hearts" from Blood on the Tracks (1975) in terms of its "content and scope". BBC Music describes the track's narrative as a "tautly-drawn lover's triangle". Billboard notes that "at the end of [the song's] seven minutes [sic] and 28 verses, three people are dead and buried". Multiple writers have highlighted the prominent bass of Tony Garnier as a defining musical feature of the song; the instrumentation also includes banjo and snare drum.

Uncut calls the track a "revenge ballad" which "sounds similarly as if it could have been lifted wholesale from an anthology of traditional folk songs, where hundreds of such tales must lurk".
