= Narrow Way (song) =

2012 song by Bob Dylan

Song by Bob Dylan

from the album Tempest
- Released: September 10, 2012
- Recorded: January–March 2012
- Studio: Groove Masters
- Genre: Blues; rock and roll
- Length: 7:28
- Label: Columbia Records
- Songwriter: Bob Dylan
- Producer: Jack Frost (Bob Dylan)

Tempest track listing
- 10 tracks: 1. "Duquesne Whistle"; 2. "Soon After Midnight"; 3. "Narrow Way"; 4. "Long and Wasted Years"; 5. "Pay in Blood"; 6. "Scarlet Town"; 7. "Early Roman Kings"; 8. "Tin Angel"; 9. "Tempest"; 10. "Roll on John"

"Narrow Way" is a blues rock song written and performed by American singer-songwriter Bob Dylan that appears as the third track on his 2012 studio album Tempest. Like much of Dylan's 21st-century output, he produced the song using the pseudonym Jack Frost.

== Composition and recording ==
"Narrow Way" is unusual in that it was written in the unorthodox 15-bar blues format. Dylan scholar Tony Attwood sees it as a "tribute to the music of the black musicians of the first half of the 20th century" with lyrics that condemn American imperialism and inequality ("We looted and we plundered on distant shores / Why is my share not equal to yours?"). In their book Bob Dylan All the Songs: The Story Behind Every Track, authors Philippe Margotin and Jean-Michel Guesdon note that "Dylan still shows the same enthusiasm for this music that he discovered with Robert Johnson earlier in his career" and praise the "excellent groove" provided by the rhythm section of drummer George Receli ("probably playing with brushes") and Tony Garnier on upright bass. The song is performed in the key of B major.

== Reception ==
Music journalist Rob Sheffield, writing in a 2020 Rolling Stone article where the song ranked 12th on a list of "The 25 Best Bob Dylan Songs of the 21st Century", called it "a highlight from Tempest", noting that it "has the edge of his most caustic Sixties putdowns, back when his idea of a good time was sneering 'She's Your Lover Now' or 'Ballad of a Thin Man' or 'Positively 4th Street', Except 'Narrow Way' has an extra 50 years’ worth of venom in it".

Tony Attwood considers it Dylan's "most brilliant blues ever", claiming that if it "had been included on Highway 61 Revisited it would be known world-wide as a Dylan masterpiece".

Spectrum Culture included the song on a list of "Bob Dylan's 20 Best Songs of the '10s and Beyond". In an article accompanying the list, critic Kevin Korber calls it "political in the historical sense; its allusions to American history and Christianity serve to portray an idea of the American experience that is all too familiar now. In 'Narrow Way', Dylan is portraying the warts-and-all lifespan of America and framing it as a struggle between enshrining lofty ideals and consistently failing to live up to them".

== Cultural references ==
The first line of the chorus ("It's a long road, it's a long and narrow way") is a reference to a passage in the Gospel of Matthew that Dylan had previously quoted in his 1979 song "When He Returns" ("But small is the gate and narrow the road that leads to life, and only a few find it").

The second line of the chorus ("If I can’t work up to you / You’ll have to work down to me someday") is a reference to the Mississippi Sheiks' 1934 song "You'll Have to Work Down to Me Someday".
