= Roll On John =

2012 song by Bob Dylan

Song by Bob Dylan

from the album Tempest
- Released: September 10, 2012
- Recorded: January–March 2012
- Studio: Groove Masters
- Genre: Pop; rock
- Length: 7:25
- Label: Columbia
- Songwriter: Bob Dylan
- Producer: Jack Frost (Bob Dylan)

Tempest track listing
- 10 tracks: 1. "Duquesne Whistle"; 2. "Soon After Midnight"; 3. "Narrow Way"; 4. "Long and Wasted Years"; 5. "Pay in Blood"; 6. "Scarlet Town"; 7. "Early Roman Kings"; 8. "Tin Angel"; 9. "Tempest"; 10. "Roll on John"

"Roll On John" is a song written and performed by American singer-songwriter Bob Dylan that appears as the tenth and final track on his 2012 studio album Tempest. Like much of Dylan's 21st-century output, he produced the song himself using the pseudonym Jack Frost.

There is a traditional folk song by the same title that Dylan had performed in 1962, but the track on Tempest is an original song that pays tribute to John Lennon featuring entirely new music and lyrics by Dylan.

== Background and composition ==
Dylan and John Lennon first met in 1964 and their paths crossed a number of times between then and Lennon's murder in 1980. It is likely, however, that the specific origins of "Roll On John" came from a public minibus tour that Dylan took of Lennon's childhood home in Liverpool in 2009. A spokeswoman for the National Trust-owned home said in an interview that Dylan "could have booked a private tour but he was happy to go on the bus with everyone else". She also noted that Dylan, who apparently went unrecognized by the other 13 tourists on the bus, "appeared to enjoy himself". Dylan himself mentioned the visit and what he had learned about Lennon's life from it in a 2012 Rolling Stone interview to promote Tempest. In the same interview, Dylan also recalled that he and his band had "started practicing" the song during soundchecks in late 2011.

In their book Bob Dylan All the Songs: The Story Behind Every Track, authors Philippe Margotin and Jean-Michel Guesdon note that, lyrically, the song "retraces the fabulous evolution of the former Beatle 'from the Liverpool docks to the red light Hamburg streets'" and that Dylan "gives a friendly nod to some of Lennon's great Beatles and post-Beatles compositions ("A Day in the Life", "Come Together", "The Ballad of John and Yoko", "Instant Karma!")...and his commitment to the civil rights movement and opposition to the Vietnam War". In terms of the music, they note "Dylan chooses to play piano, with a Lennon-like delay in his voice. The interpretation is moving, the harmonies reminiscent of John's first solo album in which he confessed not to believe, neither in the Beatles nor in a certain . . . Zimmerman ('God' on John Lennon/Plastic Ono Band, 1970)". The song is performed in the key of A-flat major.

== Reception ==
Spectrum Culture included "Roll On John" on a list of "Bob Dylan's 20 Best Songs of the '10s and Beyond". In an article accompanying the list, critic David Harris claims that "Dylan looks at Lennon as myth more than man", noting how "the song veers wildly into an exploration of slavery, Jesus and William Blake" but that "there is something entrancing about Dylan’s meanderings, especially when the words, "I read the news today, oh boy", cut through the cryptic text like a bright beacon".

In a five-star review of Tempest in Rolling Stone, Will Hermes named the track one of the two "most powerful cuts" on the album (along with "Tempest").

Margotin and Guesdon refer to it in their book as "absolutely brilliant" and "one of Dylan's most moving songs" although they also complain that his voice sounds "shredded" on the studio recording.

Singer/songwriter Elliott Murphy cited it as one of Dylan's top 10 songs of the 21st century in an article for Poetic Justice Magazine.

== Cultural references ==
The final verse, "Tyger, tyger burning bright / I pray the Lord my soul to keep / In the forest of the night / Cover him over and let him sleep", references William Blake's well-known Song of Experience "The Tyger" from 1794.

== Live performances ==
Dylan has only played the song live in concert twice, both times in 2013: on November 24 at the Opera House Theatre, Blackpool, and on November 26 at the Royal Albert Hall in London. Lennon had ties to both locations, and Dylan's guitarist Stu Kimball later recalled the song's live debut in Blackpool as being one of the highlights of his 15-year tenure in Dylan's Never Ending Tour band: "That was the night that the boss called 'Roll On John', which was the first time we ever played it, and it was just amazing. The whole place went crazy and then silent, listening...More than one tear was shed".
