= Tempest (Bob Dylan song) =

2012 song by Bob Dylan

Song by Bob Dylan

from the album Tempest
- Released: September 10, 2012
- Recorded: January–March 2012
- Studio: Groove Masters
- Genre: Folk
- Length: 13:54
- Label: Columbia Records
- Songwriter: Bob Dylan
- Producer: Jack Frost (Bob Dylan)

Tempest track listing
- 10 tracks: 1. "Duquesne Whistle"; 2. "Soon After Midnight"; 3. "Narrow Way"; 4. "Long and Wasted Years"; 5. "Pay in Blood"; 6. "Scarlet Town"; 7. "Early Roman Kings"; 8. "Tin Angel"; 9. "Tempest"; 10. "Roll on John"

"Tempest" is an epic modern folk song about the sinking of the RMS Titanic written and performed by American singer-songwriter Bob Dylan. It appears as the ninth track on his 2012 studio album of the same title. Like much of Dylan's 21st-century output, he produced the song himself using the pseudonym Jack Frost.

"Tempest" is Dylan's third longest song, behind only 2020's "Murder Most Foul" and 1997's "Highlands". It provoked divisive critical reactions upon release, with views ranging from "one of his best songs ever" to "one of his worst songs ever".

== Background and composition ==
Dylan has acknowledged the Carter Family's recording of "The Titanic" (AKA "After the Sinking of the Titanic"), a song believed to have been written by Seth Newton Mize in the early 1920s, as a starting point: In a 2012 interview with Rolling Stone's Mikal Gilmore, he stated, "I was just fooling with that one night. I liked that melody — I liked it a lot. ‘Maybe I’m gonna appropriate this melody’. But where would I go with it?" Dylan appropriated some lyrics and part of the melody from the Carter Family's recording, transforming them into a 45-verse epic that freely mixes fact and fiction.

When asked by Gilmore about the surprising appearance of Titanic actor Leonardo DiCaprio as a character on the ship in his song, Dylan responded, "Yeah, Leo, I don’t think the song would be the same without him. Or the movie...People are going to say, ‘Well, it’s not very truthful'. But a songwriter doesn’t care about what’s truthful. What he cares about is what should’ve happened, what could’ve happened. That’s its own kind of truth".

Harvard University Classics Professor Richard F. Thomas, who considers the song one of Dylan's greatest achievements, researched its composition at The Bob Dylan Archive in Tulsa, Oklahoma. He discovered that Dylan began writing the first draft of the song on hotel stationery during the European leg of the Never Ending Tour in summer 2010 and that the song progressed from "alphabetical wordlists" written in Istanbul in late May to "the almost-finished song" in Spain one month later. Thomas defended Dylan's use of appropriation in the song's composition by stating, "We are supposed to recognize the theft — along with the melody — compare the two, and see that Dylan’s song is both in a tradition and surpasses that tradition".

== Critical reception and legacy ==
Most of the negative reviews that appeared at the time of the song's release focused on its length and sprawling character: In the New York Daily News, Jim Farber wrote that, "Unfortunately, you'll feel every minute" of the song's 14-minute run time. The Wall Street Journal's Jim Fusilli agreed, writing that Tempest's title track represents the album "at its worst", calling it "undisciplined and banal". But a USA Today article ranking "all of Bob Dylan's songs", where "Tempest" placed 76th (out of 359), suggested that the track benefited from more listens: "It was a song you listened to for the first time and figured, 'that was nice, but I’ll never listen to it again'. Yet every time it pops up, its hypnotic rhyming structure makes you keep listening and 15-minutes later you’re glad you did".

Greil Marcus cited the song as one of his favorites on Tempest and defended it in an interview with The Nation: "It doesn’t get boring, and that’s because his engagement with the story he’s telling is so complete. It’s a song that’s kind of like the album as a whole: for the first three or four minutes you might think, 'Well, okay, I’ll be back in a minute'. Then it becomes a lot harder, a lot more dangerous, a lot uglier, and you begin to feel a sense of horror and dread at what’s going on. Characters that he’s introduced before are being disposed of, are being wiped out of the song. It becomes like a battle, like a war, rather than a sentimental 'oh, it was sad when the great ship went down'".

Among the most positive notices were a Los Angeles Times review in which critic Randy Lewis cited it as "one of the most extraordinary compositions from the most acclaimed songwriter of the rock era"; a Billboard review that called the song "Ambitious, successful and absolutely startling"; and a five-star Rolling Stone album review where critic Will Hermes named the track one of Tempest's two "most powerful cuts" (along with "Roll On John") and praised the effectiveness of its "inescapable" central metaphor: "a seemingly unsinkable behemoth going down amid small acts of bravery that change little, rich and poor doomed equally".

Spectrum Culture included the song on a list of "Bob Dylan's 20 Best Songs of the '10s and Beyond".

The musician and comedian Tim Heidecker released his own 15-minute version of a song about the Titanic in advance of Dylan's, stating: "I wrote this song to see if I could beat the Master to it".

== Cultural references ==
The line "Turned his eyes up to the heavens", describing the action of a Bishop on the ship, is taken from the traditional folk song "Frankie and Albert". In the original song, the line is followed by "Said, 'Nearer, My God, to Thee'", which Dylan omits. Through its absence, Dylan seems to be making a veiled reference to the hymn that the band on the Titanic allegedly played as the ship sank.

The verse beginning with the line "The rich man Mr. Astor / kissed his darling wife" tells the true story of John Jacob Astor IV, a passenger on the Titanic who indeed perished when the ship sank and was survived by his wife (who made it onto a lifeboat).

The line "Davey the brothel keeper / came out, dismissed his girls" is a paraphrase of a sentence in Satire VI ("Later, when the pimp was already dismissing his girls...") by the Ancient Roman poet Juvenal.

The line "The loveliest and the best" is quotation from the Rubaiyat of Omar Khayyam.
