= Scarlet Town (song) =

2012 song by Bob Dylan

Song by Bob Dylan

from the album Tempest
- Released: September 10, 2012
- Recorded: January–March 2012
- Studio: Groove Masters
- Genre: Folk; rock and roll
- Length: 7:17
- Label: Columbia Records
- Songwriter: Bob Dylan
- Producer: Jack Frost (Bob Dylan)

Tempest track listing
- 10 tracks: 1. "Duquesne Whistle"; 2. "Soon After Midnight"; 3. "Narrow Way"; 4. "Long and Wasted Years"; 5. "Pay in Blood"; 6. "Scarlet Town"; 7. "Early Roman Kings"; 8. "Tin Angel"; 9. "Tempest"; 10. "Roll on John"

"Scarlet Town" is a folk song written and performed by Bob Dylan that appears as the sixth track on his 2012 studio album Tempest. Like much of Dylan's 21st-century output, he produced the song himself using the pseudonym Jack Frost.

== Composition and recording ==
In their book Bob Dylan All the Songs: The Story Behind Every Track, authors Philippe Margotin and Jean-Michel Guesdon discuss the song as one that, in spite of its references to traditional folk music, is "pure Dylan". They synopsize it as describing "a damned city" and note that the "nostalgic tone" of Dylan's vocal "gives a hypnotic force to the song and makes it one of the triumphs of the album". They also praise the musicianship, claiming that Donnie Herron's banjo and David Hidalgo's accordion "confer a country style on the song" and that Charlie Sexton plays "an excellent guitar solo" beginning at the 4:09 mark.

== Themes ==
Historian and Harvard Latinist Richard F. Thomas, taking a cue from Dylan (who spoke about Julius Caesar possibly being "transfigured" in a Rolling Stone interview to promote Tempest), sees the title location of the song, ostensibly American, as being the city of Ancient Rome "transfigured". Thomas interprets the line "In Scarlet Town you fight your father's foes" as a reference to Augustus Caesar, the adoptive son of Julius and the future Emperor of Rome, who had to fight and defeat his father's enemies. Thomas also claims that the song's sixth verse "points in its entirety to Rome and adds a new ingredient, that of Christians under Rome or in Rome: 'On marble slabs and in fields of stone You make your humble wishes known / I touched the garment but the hem was torn / In Scarlet Town where I was born'. 'Marble slabs and in fields of stone' has an ancient world feel to it, perhaps the Roman Forum, while the next lines point toward biblical lands and to the woman in the Gospel of Luke 8.43–48 who makes her humble wishes known by touching the hem of Jesus’s garment as Jesus passes by, and is immediately cured of her chronic bleeding".

== Critical reception ==
Greil Marcus has cited "Scarlet Town" as the song on Tempest that's "most remarkable" to him. Marcus observed that, although it has its origins in the traditional British folk ballad "Barbara Allen", which begins with the line "In Scarlet Town where I was born" and ends with the double suicide of the protagonists, Dylan is painting a very different and even darker picture: "He’s talking about what it would be like to grow up in a town where that horror overshadows absolutely everything. It has an allure, maybe a kind of beckoning toward your own annihilation, or an allure of romance that, along with the ugliness and fear and terror, makes it a place that’s impossible ever to forget".

Spectrum Culture included the song on a list of "Bob Dylan's 20 Best Songs of the '10s and Beyond". In an article accompanying the list, critic Jacob Nierenberg describes the title location as "a creepy and surreal place – you can still see the Seven Wonders of the Ancient World – yet it’s not so different from our current world, where angels’ clothes are torn and the dead keep dying. Dylan sings of economic ruin ('Gold is down to a quarter of an ounce') and generational cycles of violence ('In Scarlet Town, you fight your father’s foes'); he even haunts a bar, drinking away his regrets over a 'flat-chested junkie whore' and barking at the performer to play Ernest Tubb’s twangy lament 'Walking the Floor Over You'. It all makes his repeated declaration that he was born in this damned place that much more haunting".

A 2021 Guardian article included it on a list of "80 Bob Dylan songs everyone should know".

== Cultural references ==
The line "Set 'em up, Joe" is a quote from the Vern Gosdin song of the same name (the song being a tribute to country music icon Earnest Tubbs life who is cited in the following line) and simultaneously a reference to Harold Arlen and Johnny Mercer's song "One for My Baby (and One More for the Road)", which is best known for the version by Frank Sinatra on his Frank Sinatra Sings for Only the Lonely album. Dylan had previously alluded to "One for My Baby (and One More for the Road)" with his original song "One for the Road", which he recorded with The Band during the sessions for The Basement Tapes in 1967.

The line that immediately follows it, "Play 'Walking the Floor", is a reference to one of country singer Ernest Tubb's biggest hits but it also interestingly foreshadows Dylan's own "Murder Most Foul" (with its narrator's repeated requests to "Play X for me").

The line “In Scarlet Town, where I was born”, which the song takes its name from, is also the opening line in many versions of the British and Appalachian folk ballad “Barbara Allen”.

== In popular culture ==
"Scarlet Town" played over the end credits of the season premiere of the Cinemax television show Strike Back: Vengeance on August 17, 2012 prior to the release of Tempest.

It was also featured in the fourth episode of the Syfy television series Defiance, originally broadcast on May 6, 2013.

== Live performances ==
Between 2012 and 2019, Dylan performed the song live 365 times on the Never Ending Tour. The live debut occurred at the Bell MTS Place in Winnipeg, Manitoba, Canada on October 5, 2012 and the last performance (to date) took place on May 13, 2025 at Talking Stick Resort Amphitheatre, in Phoenix.
