= Forgetful Heart =

2009 song by Bob Dylan

Song by Bob Dylan

from the album Together Through Life
- Released: April 28, 2009
- Recorded: December 2008
- Studio: Groove Masters
- Genre: Folk rock; blues rock
- Length: 3:42
- Label: Columbia Records
- Songwriters: Bob Dylan; Robert Hunter
- Producer: Jack Frost (Bob Dylan)

"Forgetful Heart" is a minor-key blues song written by American singer-songwriter Bob Dylan (with Grateful Dead lyricist Robert Hunter) that appears as the fifth track on Dylan's 2009 studio album Together Through Life. Like much of Dylan's 21st century output, he produced the song himself using the pseudonym Jack Frost.

== Composition and recording ==
Dylan scholar Tony Attwood has characterized "Forgetful Heart" as "a 12 bar blues in the minor key with some variant chords added, and without the repeated first line of the lyrics that many traditional blues songs have". Like half of the tracks on Together Through Life, but uncharacteristic of most of Dylan's post-Time Out of Mind original material, it is under four minutes long and features an instrumental break with a guitar solo. In addition to Dylan, the song features Tom Petty and the Heartbreakers' Mike Campbell and Stu Kimball on electric guitars, David Hidalgo on accordion, Donnie Herron on banjo, Tony Garnier on bass and George Receli on drums. When asked in an interview why he decided to put an "Appalachian banjo on a minor-key blues song", Dylan responded, "I think it probably came up at the studio. A banjo wouldn't be out of character though. There is a minor key modality to 'Forgetful Heart'. It's like 'Little Maggie' or 'Darling Cory', so there is no reason a banjo shouldn't fit or sound right".

Lyrically, the song features the rhetorical device of a first-person narrator "address(ing) his heart as if it had a mind of its own". This is a conceit that Dylan had previously employed in a more lighthearted vein with his 1981 single "Heart of Mine". The lyrics to "Forgetful Heart" have been praised for their dark and mysterious character; the last lines, in particular, "The door has closed forever more / If indeed there ever was a door", have received significant attention.

== Critical reception ==
Tony Attwood sees "Forgetful Heart" as utilizing a theme that Dylan has explored throughout his career: "the woman having loved the man, expressed all her love, and then being very close to acting 'like we never have met'", and notes that the song is "halfway between..."Visions of Johanna" and "Not Dark Yet". Attwood also believes the enigmatic final couplet makes the song darker than "Not Dark Yet": "'I've lost my greatest love' is not nearly so deep and dark as 'maybe I never had her'".

In their book Bob Dylan All the Songs: The Story Behind Every Track, authors Philippe Margotin and Jean-Michel Guesdon call it "the most desperate song on Together Through Life" and praise Mike Campbell's "saturated guitar solo" and the "excellent rhythm section" including George Receli's overdubbed tambourine part. They also interpret the final couplet as an "implicit reference" to a famous line from William Faulkner's Requiem for a Nun: "The past is never dead. It's not even past".

Critic Sean Curnyn named "Forgetful Heart" "one of the great latter-day Bob Dylan songs" and cited the song in live performance as "one of the most beautiful, deeply resonant and spine-tingling things to ever occur during a Bob Dylan show, in this decade or any other".

A 2015 USA Today list ranking "every Bob Dylan song" placed "Forgetful Heart" 82nd (out of 359). An article accompanying the list noted that Together Through Life is the "least regarded of Dylan's five late-career records, but there are plenty of gems to be mined anyway". A 2021 Guardian article included it on a list of "80 Bob Dylan songs everyone should know".

== In popular culture ==
Olivier Dahan used the song to score the opening scene of his 2010 Renée Zellweger-starring film My Own Love Song.

== Cultural references ==
The phrase "walking shadow" from the line "Like a walking shadow in my brain" is taken from a famous soliloquy in William Shakespeare's Macbeth ("Life's but a walking shadow, a poor player / That struts and frets his hour upon the stage / And then is heard no more").

Some critics see the final couplet ("The door has closed forever more / If indeed there ever was a door") as referencing Shakespeare's Hamlet ("Let the doors be shut upon him that he may play the fool nowhere but in's own house"), a play Dylan quotes more explicitly on Together Through Life's closing song "It's All Good".

== Live performances ==
Dylan played "Forgetful Heart" live 234 times on the Never Ending Tour between 2009 and 2015. The song's live debut occurred at Summerfest in Milwaukee, Wisconsin on July 1, 2009, a recording of which was made available to stream on Dylan's official website that same month. Unlike the full, electric sound of the original studio performance, Dylan has favored a sparse arrangement (driven by finger-picked acoustic guitar, harmonica and Donnie Herron on viola instead of banjo) for the song's live outings. Dylan's last performance of the song took place at Talking Stick Resort Amphitheatre in Phoenix, AZ on July 13, 2025 before he reintroduced it to his setlists at The La Crosse Center in LaCrosse, Wisconsin on March 27, 2026..

== Notable covers ==
English jazz singer Barb Jungr covered the song and released it as a single in 2021.
