= Duquesne Whistle =

2012 single by Bob Dylan

- cover of the 7" US single

Single by Bob Dylan

from the album Tempest
- B-side: "Meet Me in the Morning"
- Released: August 27, 2012
- Recorded: January–March, 2012
- Studio: Groove Masters
- Genre: Folk rock; rock and roll; jazz rock
- Length: 5:43
- Label: Columbia
- Songwriters: Bob Dylan; Robert Hunter
- Producer: Jack Frost (Bob Dylan)

Bob Dylan singles chronology
"Early Roman Kings" (2012)	"Duquesne Whistle" (2012)	"Wigwam" (2013)

Tempest track listing
- 10 tracks: 1. "Duquesne Whistle"; 2. "Soon After Midnight"; 3. "Narrow Way"; 4. "Long and Wasted Years"; 5. "Pay in Blood"; 6. "Scarlet Town"; 7. "Early Roman Kings"; 8. "Tin Angel"; 9. "Tempest"; 10. "Roll on John"

"Duquesne Whistle" (/djuːˈkeɪn/ dew-KAYN) is a song written by Bob Dylan and Grateful Dead lyricist Robert Hunter that appears as the opening track on Dylan's 2012 studio album Tempest. It was first released as a digital single on August 27, 2012 through Columbia Records then as a music video two days later. A limited edition "Record Store Day" 7" stereo single was released on November 23, 2012. It was also anthologized on the 2014 reissue of The Essential Bob Dylan. Like much of Dylan's 21st-century output, he produced the song himself using the pseudonym Jack Frost.

== Composition and recording ==
Duquesne Whistle has been described as a "chugging number", with several critics noting how the music resembles the sound of a locomotive and thus underscores the lyrics, which entwine train imagery, and the motif of a train whistle in particular, with an affectionate reminiscence of a woman. In their book Bob Dylan All the Songs: The Story Behind Every Track, authors Philippe Margotin and Jean-Michel Guesdon speculate that the lyrics may be a holdover from Dylan's previous album of original material, 2009's Together Through Life, where Dylan co-wrote all but one of the songs with Robert Hunter (whereas "Duquesne Whistle" is the only co-written song on Tempest). They also note that the song's "rhythm is played on steel guitar, doubled on electric and piano, and backed by an acoustic guitar", claiming that the arrangement "transports listeners to an earlier time" and calling the result "irresistible". The song is performed in the key of E-flat major.

== Reception ==
Music journalist Simon Vozick-Levinson, writing in a 2020 Rolling Stone article where the song ranked 10th on a list of "The 25 Best Bob Dylan Songs of the 21st Century", commented on the playful ambiguity of the lyrics, noting that the central image of a train whistle could either sound like "the last trumpet of the apocalypse" or function as a "symbol of music's redemptive power". He also mentions the song's melodic similarity to "a 1930 tune ['Each Day'] by New Orleans jazz great Jelly Roll Morton". Ann Powers, writing for NPR, likewise noted the song's relationship to jazz, favorably comparing Dylan's vocal performance to that of Louis Armstrong, and considering the possibility that the song could be "a sly tribute to Earl 'Fatha' Hines, the jazz great whose stride piano would have fit perfectly in this arrangement, and who was born in Duquesne [Pennsylvania] in 1903".

Spectrum Culture included the song on a list of "Bob Dylan's 20 Best Songs of the '10s and Beyond". In an article accompanying the list, critic Justin Cober-Lake praised the song for the paradoxical way it manages to seem both ancient and modern: "By 2012, Dylan was five proper albums into yet another renaissance, and his band by now sounded less like a throwback to a mythic past and more like the current sound of Dylan’s Americana. The mix of sound, train imagery, and allusion gives the track an edge of hyperreality; we aren’t really thinking about Dust Bowl transportation or old-time factory whistles, but we settle into our parallel ideas about history ... It's unclear but irrelevant whether Dylan faces love or apocalypse. It doesn’t matter why a 'time bomb in my heart' would be a good thing. The song piles up evocations not to invite understanding but to situate the listener. The opening few bars provide misdirection with both sound and tempo, yet they open Dylan's world and provide just one more indication of where he's going. Wherever this train track leads, it must be worth going".

The Sydney Morning Herald named "Duquesne Whistle" one of the "Top five Bob Dylan songs" in a 2021 article, noting that the "jaunty choo-choo shuffle is equal parts joyride and rakish escape plan. 'You old rascal, I know exactly where you're going / I'll leave you there myself at the break of day'".

NJArts critic Jay Lustig identified it as his favorite song on Tempest, calling it "a musically jaunty train song with some surprisingly jagged lyrics" and "a winner". Mark Knopfler listed the song as one of eight songs he would take to a desert island on the Desert Island Discs show of BBC Radio 4 in August 2024.

== Music video ==
Bob Dylan in a screen capture from the "Duquesne Whistle" music video

Nash Edgerton directed a music video for the song, which debuted on the website of The Guardian on August 29, 2012, 12 days before the release of Tempest. The video intercuts footage of Dylan and a group of younger cohorts walking through downtown Los Angeles with a narrative involving a man's disastrous attempt to court a woman on the same city streets. The two storylines converge in a final scene where Dylan and his crew literally step over the man's badly beaten body on the sidewalk. The video provoked controversy because of its depiction of violence although some defended it on the grounds that it functions as a subversive parody of the romantic comedy genre.

== Chart performance ==
The song spent four weeks on the Japan Billboard Hot 100 chart, peaking at number 60 on October 19, 2012.

== Live performances ==
Between 2013 and 2018, Dylan played the song 379 times on the Never Ending Tour. The live debut took place at the Cruzan Amphitheatre in West Palm Beach, Florida on June 26, 2013, and the last performance (to date) took place at the Newcastle Entertainment Centre in Newcastle, New South Wales, Australia on August 22, 2018.

== Cover versions ==
"Duquesne Whistle" was covered by Tom Petty and the Heartbreakers keyboardist Benmont Tench on his 2014 debut solo album You Should Be So Lucky.

The song is featured in Conor McPherson's musical play Girl from the North Country, which is scored entirely by Bob Dylan songs and had its premiere at the Old Vic in London in 2017. Jack Shalloo sings the song on the Original London Cast Recording album, also released in 2017.

A video of the song performed by Girl from the North Country Broadway cast member Todd Almond at the Belasco Theatre, directed by Kimber Elayne Sprawl, was released on June 1, 2021, to coincide with an announcement of the play's resumption of live performances following the COVID-19 pandemic.
