= Long and Wasted Years =

2012 song by Bob Dylan

Song by Bob Dylan

from the album Tempest
- Released: September 10, 2012
- Recorded: January–March 2012
- Studio: Groove Masters
- Genre: Folk; rock and roll
- Length: 3:47
- Label: Columbia Records
- Songwriter: Bob Dylan
- Producer: Jack Frost (Bob Dylan)

Tempest track listing
- 10 tracks: 1. "Duquesne Whistle"; 2. "Soon After Midnight"; 3. "Narrow Way"; 4. "Long and Wasted Years"; 5. "Pay in Blood"; 6. "Scarlet Town"; 7. "Early Roman Kings"; 8. "Tin Angel"; 9. "Tempest"; 10. "Roll on John"

"Long and Wasted Years" is a song written and performed by Bob Dylan that appears as the fourth track on his 2012 studio album Tempest and was anthologized on the 2016 reissue of The Essential Bob Dylan. Like much of Dylan's 21st-century output, he produced the song himself using the pseudonym Jack Frost.

== Composition and recording ==
Unusually for a Dylan song, "Long and Wasted Years" has no musical chorus or bridge and there is no lyrical refrain. Dylan recites 10 four-line verses over a "descending chord progression that becomes relentlessly more intense" as it repeats for nearly four minutes. In their book Bob Dylan All the Songs: The Story Behind Every Track, authors Philippe Margotin and Jean-Michel Guesdon synopsize the song as describing the "twilight of a couple's contentious relationship" and raise the possibility that it may be "an allusion to the temptation of Adam and Eve by Satan and their expulsion from the Garden of Eden as described in John Milton's epic poem Paradise Lost". They note that Dylan's "singing is strong, half-sarcastic, half-ferocious".

== Critical reception ==
Music journalist Patrick Doyle, writing in a 2020 Rolling Stone article where the song ranked 14th on a list of "The 25 Best Bob Dylan Songs of the 21st Century", compared the song's themes to Martin Scorsese's film The Irishman, observing that both feature a narrator looking back and surveying "the wreckage of a messy life". Doyle praised the "small details" that make the song, "like when Dylan says, 'I ain’t seen my family in 20 years/That ain’t easy to understand, they may be dead by now/I lost track of ’em after they lost their land'”.

Greil Marcus has cited "Long and Wasted Years" as the song that got him "into this record [Tempest]", adding: "I just love it. I have to tell you I haven’t listened to the words at all. I have no idea what story is being told. I love the way he speechifies through the song. He sounds like Luke the Drifter, Hank Williams’s religious alter-ego. He sounds like Elmer Gantry. He is a preacher, a con man; he is lying through his teeth. And he believes every word he’s saying. For me this is just a declamatory voice, and it breaks the mold of this record".

Spectrum Culture included the song on a list of "Bob Dylan's 20 Best Songs of the '10s and Beyond". In an article accompanying the list, critic Ian Maxton write that "The song might be seen as an early sketch for 'Murder Most Foul' – the invocation of 'Twist and Shout' stands out in the song’s unraveling of the past".

The Big Issue placed it at No. 54 on a list of the "80 best Bob Dylan songs - that aren't the greatest hits".

A 2021 WhatCulture article on the "10 Most Underrated Bob Dylan Songs" placed "Long and Wasted Years" at No. 4, noting that it "doesn’t sound like much if anything else in his canon, and his continued musical invention at the ripe old age of (then) 71 is beyond impressive. It’s a quietly devastating tune in a collection that tends to go for quantity and gusto".

== Live performances ==
Between 2013 and 2019, Dylan performed the song live 359 times on the Never Ending Tour. The live debut occurred at the Oslo Spektrum in Oslo, Norway on October 10, 2013, and the last performance (to date) took place at the Ameris Bank Amphitheatre in Alpharetta, Georgia on June 21, 2024.
