= Soon After Midnight =

2012 song by Bob Dylan

Song by Bob Dylan

from the album Tempest
- Released: September 10, 2012
- Recorded: January–March 2012
- Studio: Groove Masters
- Genre: Pop; rock
- Length: 3:27
- Label: Columbia
- Songwriter: Bob Dylan
- Producer: Jack Frost (Bob Dylan)

Tempest track listing
- 10 tracks: 1. "Duquesne Whistle"; 2. "Soon After Midnight"; 3. "Narrow Way"; 4. "Long and Wasted Years"; 5. "Pay in Blood"; 6. "Scarlet Town"; 7. "Early Roman Kings"; 8. "Tin Angel"; 9. "Tempest"; 10. "Roll on John"

"Soon After Midnight" is a song written and performed by American singer-songwriter Bob Dylan that appears as the second track on his 2012 studio album Tempest. Like much of Dylan's 21st-century output, he produced the song himself using the pseudonym Jack Frost.

== Composition and recording ==
"Soon After Midnight" is a love song/murder ballad hybrid. At less than three-and-a-half minutes, it is the shortest of the 10 songs on Tempest and the only example of the pre-rock pop ballad genre to be found on the album. The title is a reference to "fairy time" in William Shakespeare's play A Midsummer Night's Dream. In their book Bob Dylan All the Songs: The Story Behind Every Track, authors Philippe Margotin and Jean-Michel Guesdon note that the song's intro owes a debt to "A New Shade of Blue" by The Bobby Fuller Four and discuss how Dylan's vocal is "sweet and gentle", taking on a "new patina that makes it less aggressive" than on other recent songs. They also praise the "excellent" playing of the band, "especially Donnie Herron's steel guitar solo, doubled by a six-string guitar". The song is performed in the key of A major.

== Reception ==
A 2015 USA Today article that ranked "all of Bob Dylan's songs" placed "Soon After Midnight" 40th on the list (out of 359), citing it as the "best song" on Tempest and comparing it to Dylan's earlier "Mississippi" as a memorable song on the theme of "lost love".

Music journalist Patrick Doyle, writing in a 2020 Rolling Stone article on "The 25 Best Bob Dylan Songs of the 21st Century", where it placed 18th, commented on the track's unique, shape-shifting nature. He describes it as beginning as "Fifties doo-wop before it turns into a murder ballad" and calls the result "soulful". Dylan scholar Jochen Markhorst also wrote an online essay in which he greatly expounded on this murder ballad conceit.

Spectrum Culture included the song on a list of "Bob Dylan's 20 Best Songs of the '10s and Beyond". In an article accompanying the list, critic Ian Maxton writes that it "elides the border between tale and metaphor like one of those optical illusions where the picture changes depending on what details you fix your eyes on: it’s both. 'It’s soon after midnight / And I don’t want nobody but you' is maybe the most terrifying line Dylan ever wrote – and all the more so for its tenderness".

The Big Issue placed it at #67 on a list of the "80 best Bob Dylan songs – that aren't the greatest hits".

== Cultural references ==
In addition to the song's title, the line "I've got a date with the fairy queen" also refers to William Shakespeare's A Midsummer Night's Dream. In the play, the character Bottom has an encounter with Titania, the fairy queen, shortly after midnight.

== Live performances ==
Between 2012 and 2021, Dylan played the song live over 470 times. This makes it the third most frequently performed song from Tempest. The song's live debut occurred at the Verizon Center in Washington, D.C., and was performed on the Outlaws Tour on August 9, 2025, at HersheyPark Stadium. As of June 2026, the song had been performed 499 times.

== Cover versions ==
Irish-American singer Aoife O'Donovan, of the bands Crooked Still and I'm with Her, released a studio recording of the song in 2016 and covered it live in concert in 2017.
