= Pay in Blood =

2012 song by Bob Dylan

Song by Bob Dylan

from the album Tempest
- Released: September 10, 2012
- Genre: Folk rock; rock and roll
- Length: 5:09
- Label: Columbia
- Songwriter: Bob Dylan
- Producer: Jack Frost (Bob Dylan)

Tempest track listing
- 10 tracks: 1. "Duquesne Whistle"; 2. "Soon After Midnight"; 3. "Narrow Way"; 4. "Long and Wasted Years"; 5. "Pay in Blood"; 6. "Scarlet Town"; 7. "Early Roman Kings"; 8. "Tin Angel"; 9. "Tempest"; 10. "Roll on John"

"Pay in Blood" is an uptempo rock song written and performed by Bob Dylan that appears as the fifth track on his 2012 studio album Tempest. Like much of Dylan's 21st-century output, he produced the song himself using the pseudonym Jack Frost.

== Composition and recording ==
Dylan apparently wrote the lyrics of the song at some point in the first half of 2011. Dylan's friend and fellow songwriter Elvis Costello recalled in an interview with The Guardian that Dylan had read him the lyrics at the West Coast Blues & Roots Festival in Fremantle, Australia where both men were performing in April 2011: "Dylan pulled out a narrow roll of paper from his jacket ('not unlike a London bus ticket'), unfurled it and proceeded to recite a new song scrawled upon it, 'Pay In Blood'. Each time the chorus line came around ('I pay in blood, but not my own') 'it was delivered with a different flourish: a swashbuckler’s panache, a black comical riposte, held with a steady gaze, tossed away with a wicked laugh or a ghost of a smile'”.

In their book Bob Dylan All the Songs: The Story Behind Every Track, authors Philippe Margotin and Jean-Michel Guesdon call the studio recording "a rock song with funky accents...There is a guitar played with a wah-wah pedal, which, combined with George G. Receli's drumming, confers on the song an original tone among the songwriter's works".

== Reception ==
Many critics have cited "Pay in Blood" as the high point of Tempest. The song has earned musical comparisons to the work of The Rolling Stones and Warren Zevon while the vengeful lyrics, featuring the memorable refrain "I pay in blood but not my own", have been appraised as among the darkest and most violent that Dylan has ever composed.

Some Dylan scholars have analyzed it as a "religious song" that evokes Old Testament wrath while others see it as more specifically relating to the phenomenon of American slavery. This latter interpretation has been bolstered by some in part because Dylan pointedly spoke about slavery in a Rolling Stone interview with journalist Mikal Gilmore to promote the album at the time of its release.

Rolling Stone ranked it as the ninth best song of 2012 and placed it sixth on a 2020 list of "The 25 Best Bob Dylan Songs of the 21st Century". An article accompanying the former list called it "one of his most vicious songs ever", noting that "Dylan conjures a demonic figure – military brass, politician, CEO, pick your poison – while guitars glint like a switchblade". An article accompanying the latter list, written from the vantage point of the final year of Donald Trump's presidency and the COVID-19 pandemic, sees it as "among Dylan's most searingly prophetic moments...In 2012, the lyrics seemed to evoke centuries of American violence, from slavery to disastrous foreign invasions. Today it sounds even more tragically urgent: Put it on and you can almost see Donald Trump trudging through Lafayette Square and red-state governors rushing to reopen as the death toll ticks higher. When this song becomes irrelevant, we shall be released".

Spectrum Culture named it one of "Bob Dylan's 20 Best Songs of the 2010s and Beyond". In an article accompanying the list, critic Jacob Nierenberg calls it the "most malevolent" track on Tempest and a song Dylan "could’ve written only in his twilight years".

== Cultural references ==
The line "Nothing more wretched than what I must endure" is a close paraphrase from a line in Book V of Tristia by the ancient Roman poet Ovid. Dylan also quoted Ovid in his previous two albums of original material, Together Through Life and Modern Times.

The line "I came to bury not to praise" is a paraphrase of a famous line from a speech by Mark Antony in Act III, Scene II of the play Julius Caesar by William Shakespeare.

== Live performances ==
Between 2012 and 2019 Dylan performed the song 549 times in concert. This makes it the second most frequently performed song from Tempest (behind only "Early Roman Kings"). The live debut occurred at the Fox Theatre in Detroit, Michigan on November 13, 2012 and the last performance (to date) took place at The Anthem in Washington, D.C., on December 8, 2019.

== Accolades ==
Accolades for "Pay in Blood"
Publication	Accolade	Rank
Rolling Stone	The 25 Best Bob Dylan Songs of the 21st Century	6
Rolling Stone	50 Best Songs of 2012	9
Spectrum Culture	Bob Dylan's 20 Best Songs of the '10s and Beyond	N/A
