= Tempest (Bob Dylan album) =

2012 album by Bob Dylan

Studio album by Bob Dylan
- Released: September 10, 2012
- Recorded: January – March 2012
- Studios: Groove Masters (Santa Monica, California)
- Genres: Folk; folk rock
- Length: 68:31
- Label: Columbia
- Producer: Jack Frost

Bob Dylan chronology
In Concert – Brandeis University 1963 (2011)	Tempest (2012)	The 50th Anniversary Collection (2012)

Bob Dylan studio album chronology
Christmas in the Heart (2009)	Tempest (2012)	Shadows in the Night (2015)

Singles from Tempest
- 1. "Early Roman Kings" Released: August 7, 2012; 2. "Duquesne Whistle" Released: August 27, 2012

Tempest is the thirty-fifth studio album by American singer-songwriter Bob Dylan, released on September 10, 2012, by Columbia Records. The album was recorded at Jackson Browne's Groove Masters Studios in Santa Monica, California. Dylan wrote all of the songs himself with the exception of "Duquesne Whistle", which he co-wrote with longtime Grateful Dead associate Robert Hunter.

Tempest was released to acclaim from music critics, who praised its traditional music influences and Dylan's dark lyrics. The album peaked at number 1 in Norway, and at number 3 on the Billboard 200. Tempest was Dylan's last album to feature original material until his 2020 album Rough and Rowdy Ways.

== Background and recording ==
The album was recorded from January to March 2012 and was produced by Dylan under the pseudonym Jack Frost. In addition to Dylan's Never Ending Tour band, the sessions featured contributions from Los Lobos' David Hidalgo. News of the album first leaked when Hidalgo spoke about it in an interview with The Aspen Times:

Hidalgo, who has played on two previous Dylan albums, wasn’t expecting to add his Mexican instruments to the new project. But there were Mexican instruments around the studio, and Hidalgo, who grew up in a Mexican-American environment in East L.A., was as attracted to the accordion, and the tres — a guitar-like instrument whose six strings are separated into three groups of two — as he was to the electric guitar when he was a kid. Dylan heard those sounds, and welcomed them into his music.

“He’d say, ‘Wow, what’s that?’” Hidalgo said from a tour stop in Fort Collins. “He liked the sound. So we’d get it in there.”

Hidalgo appreciated Dylan’s embrace of the Mexican sounds. But he has an even bigger appreciation of Dylan’s outlook on music generally. The recording session, he said, was nothing like the earlier ones he had done with Dylan.

“It was a great experience. And different. Each one has been different, all completely different approaches. It’s an amazing thing, how he keeps creativity. I don’t see how he does it.”

The sessions were engineered by Scott Litt, a producer best known for his work with R.E.M., Nirvana, and The Replacements. According to a 2012 article in The New Yorker, "Litt's biggest contribution to Tempest may have been a prized pair of old Neumann microphones that he owns, worth twenty-five thousand dollars or so each. They are 'omnidirectional'; you can set one up in the middle of the room and record many musicians at once, in the round. It was an unorthodox, old-fashioned approach, but Dylan apparently liked what the mikes picked up. 'It created a soundscape, and he kind of fit over it', Litt said. Dylan's voice stood out. Litt didn't mess with it. Listeners will not dispute that few tricks were deployed to enhance it".

== Artwork ==
The cover art for Tempest incorporates a dark red duotone photograph of a statue located at the base of the Pallas-Athene Fountain in front of the Austrian Parliament Building in Vienna. The statue is one of four figures on the intermediate platform of the fountain bowl personifying the main rivers of Austria-Hungary: the Danube, the Inn, the Elbe, and the Moldau. The figure shown on the album cover represents the Moldau. The sculpture was created by Carl Kundmann between 1893 and 1902 based on architect Theophil Hansen's original plans. The photograph was taken by Alexander Längauer from his Shutterstock portfolio, and the package was designed by Coco Shinomiya. As with all Dylan albums of the past 15 years, the packaging features minimal credits and no printed lyrics. The deluxe limited edition CD includes a 60-page notebook of rare vintage magazines with Bob Dylan on the front cover. The covers are from the collections of Magne Karlstad and Oddbjørn Saltnes.

== Release ==
Tempest was released on September 10, 2012, in the United Kingdom and September 11 in the United States. It was announced for release on July 17, 2012, through a press release on Dylan's official web site. The release was issued as a CD, an LP, and as a digital download through online retailers. Various pre-order packages were available from Dylan's official online store including a combined CD/MP3 download of the album, an LP-only version, and two CD/LP bundles including a signature Bob Dylan Hohner harmonica in the different keys and an exclusive 11"x17" poster. A segment of "Early Roman Kings" was featured in a Cinemax commercial for the TV series Strike Back: Vengeance, and "Scarlet Town" was featured during the end credits of the first two episodes, both of which aired on August 17, 2012. "Early Roman Kings" and "Duquesne Whistle", written by Dylan and the latter with Robert Hunter, were released as the album's singles, the latter accompanied by a music video; the video was directed by Nash Edgerton, who had directed videos for two previous Dylan songs. Rolling Stone wrote that the video "initially seems like a Charlie Chaplin-inspired bit of light comedy", but that it takes a "shockingly dark turn".

The album's title initially spurred rumors that it would be Dylan's final album, based on its similarity to the title of Shakespeare's final play. Dylan responded: "Shakespeare's last play was called The Tempest. It was not called just plain 'Tempest'. The name of my record is just plain Tempest. It's two different titles".

== Critical reception ==
Professional ratings
Aggregate scores
Source	Rating
AnyDecentMusic?	8.0/10
Metacritic	83/100
Review scores
Source	Rating
AllMusic	3.5/5 stars
Chicago Tribune	3.5/4 stars
Entertainment Weekly	A
The Guardian	4/5 stars
The Independent	4/5 stars
Mojo	5/5 stars
MSN Music (Expert Witness)	B+
Pitchfork	6.8/10
Rolling Stone	5/5 stars
Spin	8/10

Tempest was widely acclaimed by contemporary music critics. At Metacritic, which assigns a normalized rating out of 100 to reviews from mainstream critics, the album received an average score of 83, which indicates "universal acclaim", based on 31 reviews. The album is often considered, along with 1997's "comeback album", Time Out of Mind, 2001's "Love and Theft", and 2006's Modern Times, as part of a string of critically acclaimed albums in late-Dylan's catalogue. Some even found it surpassing those other albums, such as Mojo Magazine, who in their review of Tempest opined, "Tempest is Dylan's best musical album of this century, a vibrant maximising of strict rules and the savaged-leather state of that voice". Likewise, Riboflavin of Tiny Mix Tapes felt that "Tempest's epic scale and grandeur makes his few previous albums look like short stories leading up to a great novel". Rob Brunner, reviewing the album for Entertainment Weekly, felt that "thirty-five albums in, Dylan remains as magical and mysterious as ever".

In his review in Rolling Stone magazine, Will Hermes gave the album five out of five stars, calling it "musically varied and full of curveballs" and "the single darkest record in Dylan's catalog". According to Hermes, the album draws upon elements common throughout Dylan's career—especially the last three albums—with music that is "built from traditional forms and drawing on eternal themes: love, struggle, death". Hermes continues:

Lyrically, Dylan is at the top of his game, joking around, dropping wordplay and allegories that evade pat readings and quoting other folks' words like a freestyle rapper on fire. "Narrow Way" is one of Dylan's most potent rockers in years, and it borrows a chorus from the Mississippi Sheiks' 1934 blues "You'll Work Down to Me Someday". "Scarlet Town" draws on verses by 19th-century Quaker poet and abolitionist John Greenleaf Whittier; and allusions to Louis Armstrong and the Isley Brothers pop up elsewhere.

Many critics praised the album for its dark lyrical nature and roots in "Old Weird America". David Edward expressed this in his review for Drowned in Sound stating, "The coherence of Tempest is the hypnotic key to its charm. Compressed together, the collection exudes a dark flow and a hidden, perilous depth." Likewise, in Magnet Magazine's review of Tempest, they felt that "Dylan has never been more deliberate or so overtly savage". Dougles Helesgrave likewise praised the album for its music sources and dark lyrics, stating:

Tempest is an album that works on many levels. Taken as sound or aural sculpture, the songs take the listener through a dark ramble through the back roads of American popular music. Every musical phrase, note, carries something that suggests more than itself. Each melody is weighed down with memory, reminding the listener of real and imagined pasts, old struggles, hinting that there’s a world rapidly slipping through our fingers, if it’s not already long gone.

Breathtaking, mythmaking, heartbreaking, the songs and ballads of Bob Dylan's Tempest are composed of intricately patterned rhyme and sound. No other songwriter can marry words and music as richly as Dylan can, and the perfect ten tracks of this record come straight to us from a bard's ear and a poet's pen.

Anne Margaret Daniel of Hot Press in her review of Tempest

In his review for American Songwriter, Jim Beviglia gave the album four and a half out of five stars, calling it "the kind of meaty offering that his most ardent fans desire most". Beviglia notes that the ambitious three-song run concluding the album "should silence any doubts, if they exist, that Dylan is still at the top of his game". "Tin Angel" tells a story of a lovers' triangle that turns into a "Shakespearean body pile, providing plenty of fodder for Dylanologists looking for symbols and hidden meanings". The title track, according to Beviglia, may be a metaphor for how mankind is "headed unknowingly toward an unfortunate fate" with Dylan examining how people react—"some nobly, some horribly, when put to the ultimate test". The closing track, "Roll on John", veers between biographical elements and Lennon song lyrics, presenting what Beviglia calls the "oft-overlooked soft side of Dylan" that is truly touching". Beviglia concludes:

Unlike the Titanic watchman fast asleep at his post, Bob Dylan's eyes are as wide open as ever, even when he's looking back. On this album, he depicts all he sees with his typical insight, dexterity, and honesty, yet he still has ways of doing so that upend all expectations. Tempest is fantastic, but being impressed by Dylan is old hat. That he still finds ways to surprise us is an achievement beyond all comprehension.

Few American writers, save Mark Twain, have spoken so eloquently and consistently at such a steady, honest clip, and the evidence continues on Tempest... At their best, new songs such as "Scarlet Town," "Tin Angel" and "Roll On, John" show an artist swirling in musical repetition and the joy of longevity. Each is longer than seven minutes and each deserves to be heard again the moment it ends. He mixes these longer narratives with a few four-minute, expertly crafted gems that float like whittled wooden birds come to life.

Randall Roberts in his review of Tempest for the Los Angeles Times

In his review in The Daily Telegraph, Neil McCormick called the album "among his best ever". According to McCormick, the songs on Tempest reveal a Dylan "genuinely fired up by the possibilities of language" and that the entire album "resounds with snappy jokes and dark ruminations, vivid sketches and philosophical asides". McCormick continued:

Tempest is certainly his strongest and most distinctive album in a decade. The sound is a distillation of the jump blues, railroad boogie, archaic country and lush folk that Dylan has been honing since 2001's Love and Theft, played with swagger and character by his live ensemble and snappily produced by the man himself. A notoriously impatient recording artist, Dylan seems to have found a style that suits his working methods. Drawing on the early 20th-century Americana that first grabbed his attention as a young man (and that he celebrated in his Theme Time Radio Hour shows) and surrounding himself with slick, intuitive musicians capable of charging these nostalgic grooves with contemporary energy, his late-period albums seem a continuation of his tours, as if he rolls right off the stage and into the studio and just keeps rocking.

In his review for the Chicago Tribune, Greg Kot gave the album three and a half out of four stars, calling it "an inspired mix of blood and bawdiness". Kot called Dylan a "masterful storyteller, by turns murderous, mischievous and tender, sometimes all at once". In his review on Uncut, Allan Jones gave the album ten out of ten stars, calling it "the most far-reaching, provocative and transfixing album of Dylan's later career. Nothing about it suggests a swansong, adios or fond adieu". In his review in The Gazette, Bernard Perusse gave the album five out of five stars, noting that it "ranks among Dylan's darker works, largely because it has the highest death toll". In his review in the Tampa Bay Times, Sean Daly gave the album an "A" rating, calling it "breathtaking but bleak" and a "mesmerizing record".

In her review for USA Today, Edna Gundersen gave the album four out of four stars, calling it "brilliant". According to Gundersen, Dylan's "peerless powers as a wordplay wizard and consummate storyteller" have not diminished with age, and that Tempest continues in the vein of his recent albums, "steeped in tradition and bent toward blues". Dylan's voice is ideal for these songs, Gundersen noted, whether he's describing a triple murder-suicide in "Tin Angel" or vilifying modern robber barons in "Early Roman Kings". Beneath the humor and mayhem Dylan layers "sexual and political metaphors and bigger truths about human nature, twisted morals, fate and mortality".

Others found the album over-hyped. In his review in The Guardian, Alexis Petridis gave the album four out of five stars but downplayed some of the superlatives offered by other reviewers who have compared Tempest to some of Dylan's finest work. In his consumer guide for MSN Music, Robert Christgau gave the album a "B+", offering a similar complaint about the "autohype machine" and how some of the reviews were overly positive. Christgau was also unimpressed with the title track and the closing number, which "aim higher with dubious-to-disgraceful results".

Rolling Stone named it the fourth best album of 2012. The magazine also named the song "Pay in Blood" the 9th best song of 2012. The album placed seventh in The Wire's annual critics' poll.

== Track listing ==
All tracks are written by Bob Dylan, except "Duquesne Whistle" (music by Dylan, lyrics by Dylan and Robert Hunter).

Tempest track listing
No.	Title	Length
1.	"Duquesne Whistle"	5:43
2.	"Soon After Midnight"	3:27
3.	"Narrow Way"	7:28
4.	"Long and Wasted Years"	3:46
5.	"Pay in Blood"	5:09
6.	"Scarlet Town"	7:17
7.	"Early Roman Kings"	5:16
8.	"Tin Angel"	9:05
9.	"Tempest"	13:54
10.	"Roll On John"	7:25
Total length:		68:31

== Personnel ==
- Bob Dylan – guitar, piano, vocals, production

Additional musicians

- Tony Garnier – bass guitar
- Donnie Herron – steel guitar, banjo, violin, mandolin
- David Hidalgo – guitar, accordion, violin
- Stu Kimball – guitar
- George G. Receli – drums
- Charlie Sexton – guitar

Technical personnel

- William Claxton – back cover photography
- Scott Litt – engineering, recording, mixing
- Dana Nielsen – recording, mixing
- John Shearer – booklet photography
- Coco Shinomiya – package design
- Shutterstock / A. Längauer – front cover photography
- Albert Watson – additional booklet photography

== Release history ==
Region	Date	Format(s)	Label	Catalog
United Kingdom	September 10, 2012	CD, LP, digital download	Columbia Records	88725157602
United States	September 11, 2012	CD, LP, digital download	Columbia Records	—N/a

== Charts ==
=== Weekly charts ===
Chart (2012)	Peak position
Australian Albums (ARIA)	8
Austrian Albums (Ö3 Austria)	1
Belgian Albums (Ultratop Flanders)	2
Belgian Albums (Ultratop Wallonia)	6
Canadian Albums (Billboard)	4
Danish Albums (Hitlisten)	1
Dutch Albums (Album Top 100)	1
Finnish Albums (Suomen virallinen lista)	3
French Albums (SNEP)	6
German Albums (Offizielle Top 100)	2
Irish Albums (IRMA)	2
Italian Albums (FIMI)	2
New Zealand Albums (RMNZ)	2
Norwegian Albums (VG-lista)	1
Polish Albums (Polish Music Charts)	9
Portuguese Albums (AFP)	4
Scottish Albums (Official Charts)	2
Spanish Albums (Promusicae)	2
Swedish Albums (Sverigetopplistan)	1
Swiss Albums (Schweizer Hitparade)	2
UK Albums (Official Charts)	3
US Billboard 200	3
US Top Rock Albums (Billboard)	2

=== Year-end charts ===
Chart (2012)	Position
Austrian Albums (Ö3 Austria)	39
Belgian Albums (Ultratop Flanders)	51
Dutch Albums (Album Top 100)	32
French Albums (SNEP)	180
German Albums (Offizielle Top 100)	89
Swedish Albums (Sverigetopplistan)	31
UK Albums (OCC)	142
US Billboard 200	137
US Top Rock Albums (Billboard)	38

== Certifications ==
Region	Certification	Certified units/sales
Austria (IFPI Austria)	Gold	10,000^{*}
Sweden (GLF)	Gold	20,000^{‡}
United Kingdom (BPI)	Gold	100,000^{‡}
United States	—	274,000
^{*} Sales figures based on certification alone.^{‡} Sales+streaming figures based on certification alone.
