= Early Roman Kings =

2012 single by Bob Dylan

Single by Bob Dylan

from the album Tempest
- Released: August 7, 2012
- Recorded: January–March 2012
- Studio: Groove Masters
- Genre: Blues
- Length: 5:16
- Label: Columbia Records
- Songwriter: Bob Dylan
- Producer: Jack Frost (Bob Dylan)

Bob Dylan singles chronology
| "Make You Feel My Love" (2010) | "Early Roman Kings" (2012) | "Duquesne Whistle" (2012) |

Tempest track listing
- 10 tracks: 1. "Duquesne Whistle"; 2. "Soon After Midnight"; 3. "Narrow Way"; 4. "Long and Wasted Years"; 5. "Pay in Blood"; 6. "Scarlet Town"; 7. "Early Roman Kings"; 8. "Tin Angel"; 9. "Tempest"; 10. "Roll on John"

"Early Roman Kings" is a blues song written and performed by Bob Dylan that appears as the seventh track on his 2012 studio album Tempest. It was also released as the album's lead single through Columbia Records on August 7, 2012. Like much of Dylan's 21st-century output, he produced the song himself using the pseudonym Jack Frost.

== Composition and recording ==
The song is built on a generic riff familiar from many blues recordings, notably Muddy Waters "Mannish Boy", Willie Dixon's "Hoochie Coochie Man" and Bo Diddley's "I'm a Man", but it has drawn praise for Dylan's humorous, original lyrics and committed performance. Writer Lloyd Fonvielle, in an online essay, noted the song's relationship to the Chicago blues and how David Hidalgo's accordion part replaces the part that would traditionally be occupied by a harmonica and/or guitar. He claims this transposition gives the track the feeling of a "ghost blues". Lyrically, Fonvielle sees the song as "a kind of road map to the apocalyptic landscape of the album as a whole. The 'early Roman kings' seem to be symbols of the wicked men ruling America today. They are vicious, supernaturally powerful, bent on domination and horrific violence".

Dylan scholar Tony Attwood has observed that the song seems to simultaneously reference the Roman Kings, who were a Bronx-based street gang in the 1960s and 1970s, as well as the Kings of Ancient Rome (who preceded the Roman Republic and the Roman Empire). Historian Richard F. Thomas agrees, noting that Dylan seems to be "playing" with classicists by creating expectations, via the "Latin" title, that the song will be about Roman antiquity then subverting those expectations by describing the titular characters as wearing "sharkskin suits". The song is performed in the key of G major.

== Critical reception ==
Critic Jedd Beaudoin, writing at PopMatters, called the song a "masterpiece", noting that it "draws on various streams of American music, namely the blues and early rock 'n' roll. With bawdy, insistent rhythms and fine, refined lyrics, the composition is a testament to the multitudes heard across the Minnesota native's output".

Irish poet Paul Muldoon called it "a particular favorite" in a 2016 New Yorker story celebrating Dylan's winning the Nobel Prize in Literature.

Greil Marcus has cited the song as one of his favorites on Tempest, calling it "hilarious".

Spectrum Culture included the song on a list of "Bob Dylan's 20 Best Songs of the '10s and Beyond". In an article accompanying the list, critic Peter Tabakis also noted Dylan's use of humor in the song: "Dylan, no doubt, is in on the joke. When he insists, 'I ain’t dead yet, my bell still rings', it’s with a smirk. A statement like that is inherently self-defeating. If you have to say it, it probably ain’t so. The proof of Dylan’s vitality here is not in his words, but in the sheer verve of this music. 'I’ve had my fun', he sings at the end of 'Early Roman Kings', a claim no one can dispute".

== In popular culture ==
"Early Roman Kings" was the first song from Tempest to be released in any form when a segment of it was featured in a Cinemax commercial for the TV series Strike Back: Vengeance in August 2012.

== Cultural references ==
The lines "I can strip you of life / Strip you of breath / Ship you down / To the house of death" are taken from Robert Fagles' translation of Book 9 of Homer's Odyssey.

== Cover versions ==
Singer-songwriter Peter Case covered the song on his 2021 album The Midnight Broadcast.

== Live performances ==
Between 2013 and 2025, Dylan performed the song live over 640 times. This makes it the most frequently performed song from Tempest by a considerable margin. The live debut occurred at the Xcel Energy Center in Saint Paul, Minnesota on November 7, 2012 and it continues to be part of his regular concert repertoire.
