= Groove Masters =

Recording studio in Santa Monica, California, USA

Coordinates: 34.021755°N 118.482420°W

Groove Masters is a semi-private recording studio owned by Jackson Browne. Located in Santa Monica, California, the studio has been the setting for many of Browne's recordings. The head sound engineer is Grammy-nominated Paul Dieter. The studio occasionally opens its doors to old friends, such as David Crosby, as well as new independent artists.

== Albums recorded ==
By Jackson Browne unless stated.

- I'm Alive (1993)
- The Naked Ride Home (2002)
- Solo Acoustic, Vol. 1 (2005)
- Solo Acoustic, Vol. 2 (2008)
- Bob Dylan, Together Through Life (2009)
- Bob Dylan, Christmas In The Heart (2009)
- New Found Glory, Coming Home (2006)
- Bob Dylan, Tempest (2012)
- David Crosby, Lighthouse (2016)
- Megan Keely, Bloom (2018)
