= Never Ending Tour 2012 =

2012 concert tour by Bob Dylan

- Tour by Bob Dylan
- Tour poster, 2012
- Start date: April 15, 2012
- End date: November 21, 2012
- Legs: 4
- No. of shows: 16 in Latin America; 55 in North America; 15 in Europe; 86 in total

Bob Dylan concert chronology
- Never Ending Tour 2011 (2011); Never Ending Tour 2012 (2012); Never Ending Tour 2013 (2013)

The Never Ending Tour is the popular name for Bob Dylan's endless touring schedule since June 7, 1988.

== Background ==
The 2012 leg of the Never Ending tour was announced via BobDylan.com on February 16, 2012. The first dates to be announced were concerts taking place in three South American Countries; Brazil, Argentina and Chile. Dylan previously visited these countries last time he toured South America on the Never Ending Tour 2008. On March 15, 2012, after being rumored in the press, it was confirmed that Dylan would perform in Heredia, Costa Rica on May 5, 2012. This was Dylan's first concert in the country of Costa Rica and his first concert in Central America. On March 28, 2012 it was confirmed that Dylan would return to Mexico, four years after his last performances there in 2008.

It was confirmed on March 27, 2012 that Dylan would return to Kent in 2012 to headline the Hop Farm Festival. Dylan had previously headlined the festival in July 2010. On March 29, 2012 Dylan's official website revealed several European concerts for the summer of 2012. These dates included official confirmation of his performances at Hop Farm Festival, Festival Internacional Benicàssim and Festival Vieilles Charrues Les Nuits de Fourvière. It was revealed that Dylan also performed at the Montreux Jazz Festival in Switzerland. Dylan also performed in Salzburg, Austria and Nîmes, France.

Dylan performed at eleven European concerts this summer including: his second performance at The Hop Farm Festival in Kent, the Citadel Music Festival in Berlin, Kunst!Rasen Gronau in Bonn, Lieder im Schloss in Bad Mergentheim, the Montreux Jazz Festival in Switzerland, Festival Internacional de Benicàssim in Spain, Festival Jardins de Cap Roig in Calella, Festival de Nîmes in France, Collisioni 2012 in Barolo, Les Nuits de Fourvière in Lyon and the Vieilles Charrues Festival in Carhaix.

Rehearsals for Dylan's 2012 European tour began at the Bardavon 1869 Opera House in Poughkeepsie, New York on Monday June 25, 2012 and lasted until Wednesday June 27, 2012 where Dylan and his band flew to England for his performance at Hop Farm Festival on Saturday June 30, 2012. Among unknown tunes Dylan and his band performed "Things Have Changed", "Nettie Moore", "Tangled Up in Blue", "Blind Willie McTell" and "Ballad of Hollis Brown". Dylan's performance at the Hop Farm Music Festival saw the introduction of a grand piano into his set, which he played for eight songs of his sixteen-song set.

On June 15, 2012, Dylan's official website announced eleven concerts that are to take place in August and September 2012. These shows include three concerts in Canada, where Dylan hadn't performed since November 2009. The following day a further two concerts were announced, one taking place in Billings, Montana and the other taking place in Rochester, Minnesota. On June 20 another two concerts were announced, one in Cincinnati and the other in Salisbury, Maryland. The tickets for Dylan's show in Cranbrook sold out in record time. The venue adjusted the position of the stage to add a further 250 tickets, which also sold out. On June 28, 2012 a further six concerts were announced taking place in August and early September. The August 15 concert in Billings, Montana was eventually cancelled due to poor ticket sales.

The much anticipated North American leg of the Dylan/Knopfler tour was announced via both BobDylan.com and MarkKnopfler.com on July 18, 2012, just one day after Dylan announced his 35th studio album, Tempest. The tour was met with a mixed to negative response. Many reviews complained about Dylan's decreasing vocal abilities and his lack of piano playing skills. As usual with Dylan reviews the press complained about Dylan's changing of song, beyond recognition sometimes. The tour's attendance was fairly poor with many reviews reporting fans leaving long before the concert was over. In an unprecedented move during his November 5 concert in Madison, Wisconsin, Dylan addressed the crowd, besides his normal band introduction and said: "We tried to play good tonight since the president was here today. Don't believe the media. I think it's going to be a landslide"

Performing only 86 concerts in 2012, Dylan performed the fewest shows during a year-long leg of the Never Ending Tour since 1996.

== Supporting acts ==
- Chicago Blues: A Living History — July 8, 2012
- Garbage — July 22, 2012
- Gossip — July 22, 2012
- Leon Russell — August 26, 2012
- The McCrary Sisters — August 26, 2012, The McCrary Sisters provided backing vocals on Blowin' in the Wind at this event
- Ben Harper — September 2, 2012
- Bob Weir — September 9, 2012
- Mark Knopfler — October 5 – November 21, 2012

== Tour dates ==
Date	City	Country	Venue
Latin America
April 15, 2012	Rio de Janeiro	Brazil	Citibank Hall
April 17, 2012	Brasília	Brazil	Nilson Nelson Gymnasium
April 19, 2012	Belo Horizonte	Brazil	Chevrolet Hall
April 21, 2012	São Paulo	Brazil	Credicard Hall
April 22, 2012	São Paulo	Brazil	Credicard Hall
April 24, 2012	Porto Alegre	Brazil	Pepsi on Stage
April 26, 2012	Buenos Aires	Argentina	Teatro Gran Rex
April 27, 2012	Buenos Aires	Argentina	Teatro Gran Rex
April 28, 2012	Buenos Aires	Argentina	Teatro Gran Rex
April 30, 2012	Buenos Aires	Argentina	Teatro Gran Rex
May 2, 2012	Santiago	Chile	Movistar Arena
May 5, 2012	Heredia	Costa Rica	Heredia Palacio de los Deportes
May 7, 2012	Monterrey	Mexico	Auditorio Banamex
May 9, 2012	Guadalajara	Mexico	Telmex Auditorium
May 11, 2012	Mexico City	Mexico	Pepsi Centre WTC
May 12, 2012	Mexico City	Mexico	Pepsi Centre WTC
Europe
June 30, 2012^{[A]}	Kent	England	The Hop Farm Country Park
July 2, 2012^{[B]}	Berlin	Germany	Zitadelle Spandau
July 3, 2012	Dresden	Germany	Freilichtbühne Junge Garde
July 4, 2012^{[C]}	Bonn	Germany	Bonn Rheinaue
July 6, 2012^{[D]}	Bad Mergentheim	Germany	Schloss Mergentheim
July 7, 2012	Salzburg	Austria	Salzburgarena
July 8, 2012^{[E]}	Montreux	Switzerland	Auditorium Stravinski
July 11, 2012	Bilbao	Spain	Guggenheim Museum Bilbao
July 13, 2012^{[F]}	Benicàssim	Spain	Benicàssim Festival Grounds
July 14, 2012^{[G]}	Calella	Spain	Jardín Botánico del Cap Roig Auditorium
July 15, 2012^{[H]}	Nîmes	France	Arènes de Nîmes
July 16, 2012^{[I]}	Barolo	Italy	Piazza Colbert
July 18, 2012^{[J]}	Lyon	France	Théâtres Romains de Fourvière
July 20, 2012	Bayonne	France	Arènes de Bayonne
July 22, 2012^{[K]}	Carhaix	France	La Prairie de Kerampuilh
North America
August 10, 2012	Lloydminster	Canada	Lloydminster Exhibition Grounds
August 11, 2012	Lethbridge	Canada	ENMAX Centre
August 12, 2012	Cranbrook	Canada	Cranbrook Recreational Complex
August 14, 2012	Missoula	United States	Big Sky Brewery
August 17, 2012	Rapid City	United States	Barnett Arena
August 18, 2012	Sioux Falls	United States	Sioux Falls Arena
August 19, 2012	Fargo	United States	Fargo Civic Center
August 21, 2012	Rochester	United States	Taylor Arena
August 22, 2012	Des Moines	United States	Wells Fargo Arena
August 24, 2012	Fort Wayne	United States	Parkview Field
August 25, 2012^{[L]}	Indianapolis	United States	The Farm Bureau Insurance Lawn
August 26, 2012	Cincinnati	United States	PNC Pavilion at Riverbend
August 28, 2012	Youngstown	United States	Covelli Centre
August 29, 2012	Johnstown	United States	Cambria County War Memorial Arena
August 30, 2012	Salisbury	United States	Wicomico Youth and Civic Center
September 1, 2012	Big Flats	United States	Tag's Budweiser Summer Stage
September 2, 2012	Bethel	United States	Bethel Woods Center for the Arts
September 4, 2012	Port Chester	United States	Capitol Theater
September 6, 2012	Lewiston	United States	Lewiston Artpark Mainstage Theater
September 7, 2012	Holyoke	United States	Holyoke Mountain Park
September 8, 2012	Uncasville	United States	Mohegan Sun Arena
September 9, 2012	Hershey	United States	Star Pavilion
North America with Mark Knopfler
October 5, 2012	Winnipeg	Canada	MTS Centre
October 6, 2012	Regina	Canada	Brandt Centre
October 8, 2012	Saskatoon	Canada	Credit Union Centre
October 9, 2012	Edmonton	Canada	Rexall Place
October 10, 2012	Calgary	Canada	Scotiabank Saddledome
October 12, 2012	Vancouver	Canada	Rogers Arena
October 13, 2012	Seattle	United States	KeyArena
October 15, 2012	Portland	United States	Rose Garden Arena
October 17, 2012	San Francisco	United States	Bill Graham Civic Auditorium
October 18, 2012	San Francisco	United States	Bill Graham Civic Auditorium
October 19, 2012	Berkeley	United States	Hearst Greek Theatre
October 20, 2012	Sacramento	United States	Power Balance Pavilion
October 22, 2012	Santa Barbara	United States	Santa Barbara Bowl
October 24, 2012	San Diego	United States	Valley View Casino Center
October 26, 2012	Los Angeles	United States	Hollywood Bowl
October 27, 2012	Las Vegas	United States	Mandalay Bay Events Center
October 29, 2012	Broomfield	United States	1stBank Center
October 30, 2012	Broomfield	United States	1stBank Center
November 1, 2012	Grand Prairie	United States	Verizon Theatre at Grand Prairie
November 2, 2012	Tulsa	United States	BOK Center
November 3, 2012	Omaha	United States	CenturyLink Center Omaha
November 5, 2012	Madison	United States	Alliant Energy Center
November 7, 2012	Saint Paul	United States	Xcel Energy Center
November 8, 2012	Milwaukee	United States	BMO Harris Bradley Center
November 9, 2012	Chicago	United States	United Center
November 12, 2012	Grand Rapids	United States	Van Andel Arena
November 13, 2012	Detroit	United States	Fox Theatre
November 14, 2012	Toronto	Canada	Air Canada Centre
November 16, 2012	Montreal	Canada	Bell Centre
November 18, 2012	Boston	United States	TD Garden
November 19, 2012	Philadelphia	United States	Wells Fargo Center
November 20, 2012	Washington, D.C.	United States	Verizon Center
November 21, 2012	Brooklyn	United States	Barclays Center

Festivals and other miscellaneous performances

^{A} This concert was a part of "Hop Farm Festival".
^{B} This concert was a part of "Citadel Music Festival".
^{C} This concert was a part of "Kunst!Rasen Gronau".
^{D} This concert was a part of "Lieder im Schloss".
^{E} This concert was a part of "Montreux Jazz Festival".
^{F} This concert was a part of "Festival Internacional de Benicàssim".

^{G} This concert was a part of "Festival Jardins de Cap Roig".
^{H} This concert was a part of "Festival de Nîmes".
^{I} This concert was a part of "Collisioni 2012".
^{J} This concert was a part of "Les Nuits de Fourvière".
^{K} This concert was a part of "Vieilles Charrues Festival".
^{L} This concert was a part of the "1800-Quit Now Concert Series".

Cancellations and rescheduled shows

April 30, 2012	Santiago, Chile	Movistar Arena	Rescheduled to May 2, 2012.
August 15, 2012	Billings, Montana	Rimrock Auto Arena at MetraPark	Cancelled due to poor ticket sales.
November 10, 2012	Chicago metropolitan area	Unconfirmed venue	Cancelled before official announcement.
November 13, 2012	Auburn Hills, Michigan	The Palace of Auburn Hills	Moved to the Fox Theatre in Detroit, Michigan due to poor ticket sales.

=== Box office score data ===
Venue	City	Tickets sold / available	Gross revenue
Citibank Hall	Rio de Janeiro	1,283 / 2,616 (49%)	$295,055
Ginasio Nilson Nelson	Brasília	6,447 / 9,645 (69%)	$586,652
Chevrolet Hall	Belo Horizonte	5,350 / 5,380 (99%)	$416,766
Credicard Hall	São Paulo	6,845 / 7,706 (89%)	$1,129,460
Pepsi On Stage	Porto Alegre	6,324 / 6,363 (99%)	$508,117
Palacio de los Deportes	Heredia	1,977 / 2,500 (79%)	$200,222
Auditorio Banamex	Monterrey	1,217 / 6,542 (19%)	$78,111
Auditorio Telmex	Guadalajara	2,571 / 4,446 (58%)	$111,373
Pepsi Center WTC	Mexico City	2,508 / 6,496 (39%)	$135,529
Big Sky Brewery	Missoula	2,293 / 2,293 (100%)	$91,200
Civic Center	Fargo	3,056 / 3,056 (100%)	$165,024
Mayo Civic Center	Rochester	4,246 / 5,000 (85%)	$221,474
Mohegan Sun Arena	Uncasville	3,662 / 4,271 (86%)	$181,269
Star Pavilion	Hersey	5,205 / 8,129 (64%)	$246,862
Rose Garden Arena	Portland	4,667 / 7,477 (62%)	$361,818
Bill Graham Civic Auditorium	San Francisco	8,280 / 10,000 (83%)	$596,670
Hearst Greek Theatre	Berkeley	7,277 / 7,277 (100%)	$606,867
Power Balance Pavilion	Sacramento	3,087 / 4,500 (69%)	$229,658
Santa Barbara Bowl	Santa Barbara	4,564 / 4,564 (100%)	$421,301
Valley View Casino Center	San Diego	5,425 / 7,928 (68%)	$387,350
Verizon Theatre	Grand Prairie	3,877 / 6,001 (65%)	$301,365
BOK Center	Tulsa	3,400 / 3,400 (100%)	$245,392
Xcel Energy Center	St Paul	7,565 / 9,850 (77%)	$602,645
United Center	Chicago	6,335 / 8,021 (79%)	$532,301
Van Andel Arena	Grand Rapids	3,154 / 9,946 (32%)	$234,600
Air Canada Centre	Toronto	8,935 / 9,000 (99%)	$756,894
Bell Centre	Montreal	5,706 / 6,712 (85%)	$474,894
Wells Fargo Center	Philadelphia	8,564 / 10,000 (86%)	$428,951
Barclays Center	Brooklyn	9,679 / 10,931 (89%)	$844,271
TOTAL		143,499 / 190,050 (76%)	$11,392,091

== Setlists ==
=== First leg ===
April 15
1. "Leopard-Skin Pill-Box Hat"
2. "It Ain't Me Babe"
3. "Things Have Changed"
4. "Tangled Up In Blue"
5. "The Levee's Gonna Break"
6. "Tryin' To Get To Heaven"
7. "Beyond Here Lies Nothin'"
8. "Desolation Row"
9. "Summer Days"
10. "Simple Twist Of Fate"
11. "Highway 61 Revisited"
12. "Forgetful Heart"
13. "Thunder On The Mountain"
14. "Ballad Of A Thin Man"
15. "Like A Rolling Stone"
16. "All Along The Watchtower"
April 17
1. "Leopard-Skin Pill-Box Hat"
2. "Don't Think Twice, It's All Right"
3. "Things Have Changed"
4. "Tangled Up In Blue"
5. "Beyond Here Lies Nothin'"
6. "Simple Twist Of Fate"
7. "Summer Days"
8. "Spirit On The Water"
9. "Honest With Me"
10. "A Hard Rain's A-Gonna Fall"
11. "Highway 61 Revisited"
12. "Blind Willie McTell"
13. "Thunder On The Mountain"
14. "Ballad Of A Thin Man"
15. "Like A Rolling Stone
16. "All Along The Watchtower"

Encore

17. "Rainy Day Women #12 & 35"
April 19
1. "Leopard-Skin Pill-Box Hat"
2. "It's All Over Now, Baby Blue"
3. "Things Have Changed"
4. "Tangled Up In Blue"
5. "Beyond Here Lies Nothin'"
6. "Spirit On The Water"
7. "High Water (For Charley Patton)"
8. "Desolation Row"
9. "Honest With Me"
10. "Simple Twist Of Fate"
11. "Highway 61 Revisited"
12. "Man In The Long Black Coat"
13. "Thunder On The Mountain"
14. "Ballad Of A Thin Man"
15. "Like A Rolling Stone"
16. "All Along The Watchtower"

Encore

17. "Rainy Day Women #12 & 35"
April 21
1. "Leopard-Skin Pill-Box Hat"
2. "Don't Think Twice, It's All Right"
3. "Things Have Changed"
4. "Tangled Up In Blue"
5. "Beyond Here Lies Nothin'"
6. "Make You Feel My Love"
7. "Honest With Me"
8. "Every Grain Of Sand"
9. "The Levee's Gonna Break"
10. "A Hard Rain's A-Gonna Fall"
11. "Highway 61 Revisited"
12. "Love Sick"
13. "Thunder On The Mountain"
14. "Ballad Of A Thin Man"
15. "Like A Rolling Stone"
16. "All Along The Watchtower"

Encore

17. "Blowin' In The Wind"

April 22
1. "Leopard-Skin Pill-Box Hat"
2. "It Ain’t Me Babe"
3. "Things Have Changed"
4. "Tangled Up In Blue"
5. "Beyond Here Lies Nothin'"
6. "Not Dark Yet"
7. "Summer Days"
8. "Simple Twist Of Fate"
9. "High Water (For Charley Patton)"
10. "Tryin’ To Get To Heaven"
11. "Highway 61 Revisited"
12. "Forgetful Heart"
13. "Thunder On The Mountain"
14. "Ballad Of A Thin Man"
15. "Like A Rolling Stone"
16. "All Along The Watchtower"

Encore

17. "Blowin In The Wind"
April 24
1. "Leopard-Skin Pill-Box Hat"
2. "It's All Over Now, Baby Blue"
3. "Things Have Changed"
4. "Tangled Up In Blue"
5. "Beyond Here Lies Nothin'"
6. "Simple Twist Of Fate"
7. "John Brown"
8. "Summer Days"
9. "Desolation Row"
10. "Blind Willie McTell"
11. "Highway 61 Revisited"
12. "Love Sick"
13. "Thunder On The Mountain"
14. "Ballad Of A Thin Man"
15. "Like A Rolling Stone"
16. "All Along The Watchtower"

Encore

17. "Blowin' In The Wind"
April 26
1. "Leopard-Skin Pill-Box Hat"
2. "It Ain't Me, Babe"
3. "Things Have Changed"
4. "Tangled Up In Blue"
5. "Beyond Here Lies Nothin'"
6. "Trying To Get To Heaven"
7. "High Water (For Charley Patton) "
8. "Spirit On The Water"
9. "The Levee's Gonna Break"
10. "A Hard Rain's A-Gonna Fall"
11. "Highway 61 Revisited"
12. "Love Sick"
13. "Thunder On The Mountain"
14. "Ballad Of A Thin Man"
15. "Like A Rolling Stone"
16. "All Along The Watchtower"

Encore

17. "Blowin' In The Wind"
April 27
1. "Leopard-Skin Pill-Box Hat"
2. "Girl From The North Country"
3. "Beyond Here Lies Nothin'"
4. "Tangled Up In Blue"
5. "Honest With Me"
6. "Desolation Row"
7. "Cry A While"
8. "Make You Feel My Love"
9. "The Levee's Gonna Break"
10. "Love Sick"
11. "Highway 61 Revisited"
12. "Simple Twist Of Fate"
13. "Thunder On The Mountain"
14. "Ballad Of A Thin Man"
15. "Like A Rolling Stone"
16. "All Along The Watchtower"

Encore

17. "Blowin' In The Wind"

April 28
1. "Leopard-Skin Pill-Box Hat"
2. "To Ramona"
3. "Beyond Here Lies Nothin'"
4. "Tangled Up In Blue"
5. "Summer Days"
6. "Not Dark Yet"
7. "Jolene"
8. "Ballad Of Hollis Brown"
9. "A Hard Rain's A-Gonna Fall"
10. "The Lonesome Death Of Hattie Carroll"
11. "Highway 61 Revisited"
12. "Forgetful Heart"
13. "Thunder On The Mountain"
14. "Ballad Of A Thin Man"
15. "Like A Rolling Stone"
16. "All Along The Watchtower"

Encore

17. "Blowin' In The Wind"
April 30
1. "Leopard-Skin Pill-Box Hat"
2. "Man In The Long Black Coat"
3. "Things Have Changed"
4. "Tangled Up In Blue"
5. "Rollin' and Tumblin'"
6. "Spirit On The Water"
7. "Summer Days"
8. "Desolation Row"
9. "High Water (For Charley Patton)"
10. "Simple Twist Of Fate"
11. "Highway 61 Revisited"
12. "Blind Willie McTell"
13. "Thunder On The Mountain"
14. "Ballad Of A Thin Man"
15. "Like A Rolling Stone"
16. "All Along The Watchtower"

Encore

17. "Blowin' In The Wind"
May 2
1. "Leopard-Skin Pill-Box Hat"
2. "It Ain't Me, Babe"
3. "Things Have Changed"
4. "Tangled Up In Blue"
5. "Beyond Here Lies Nothin'"
6. "Desolation Row"
7. "Cry A While"
8. "Trying To Get To Heaven"
9. "The Levee's Gonna Break"
10. "Simple Twist Of Fate"
11. "Highway 61 Revisited"
12. "Love Sick"
13. "Thunder On The Mountain"
14. "Ballad Of A Thin Man"
15. "Like A Rolling Stone"
16. "All Along The Watchtower"

Encore

17. "Blowin' In The Wind"
May 5
1. "Leopard-Skin Pill-Box Hat"
2. "Don't Think Twice, It's All Right"
3. "Beyond Here Lies Nothin'"
4. "Tangled Up In Blue"
5. "Summer Days"
6. "Not Dark Yet"
7. "Jolene"
8. "Ballad Of Hollis Brown"
9. "A Hard Rain's A-Gonna Fall"
10. "The Lonesome Death Of Hattie Carroll"
11. "Highway 61 Revisited"
12. "Love Sick"
13. "Thunder On The Mountain"
14. "Ballad Of A Thin Man"
15. "Like A Rolling Stone"
16. "All Along The Watchtower"

Encore

17. "Rainy Day Women #12 & 35"
18. "Blowin' In The Wind"

May 7
1. "Leopard-Skin Pill-Box Hat"
2. "Man In The Long Black Coat"
3. "Things Have Changed"
4. "Tangled Up In Blue"
5. "Cry A While"
6. "Spirit On The Water"
7. "Summer Days"
8. "Desolation Row"
9. "High Water (For Charley Patton)"
10. "Simple Twist Of Fate"
11. "Highway 61 Revisited"
12. "Blind Willie McTell"
13. "Thunder On The Mountain"
14. "Ballad Of A Thin Man"
15. "Like A Rolling Stone"
16. "All Along The Watchtower"

Encore

17. "Blowin' In The Wind"
May 9
1. "Leopard-Skin Pill-Box Hat"
2. "It's All Over Now, Baby Blue"
3. "Things Have Changed"
4. "Tangled Up In Blue"
5. "Cry A While"
6. "A Hard Rain's A-Gonna Fall"
7. "The Levee's Gonna Break"
8. "Trying To Get To Heaven"
9. "High Water (For Charley Patton)"
10. "Forgetful Heart"
11. "Highway 61 Revisited"
12. "Love Sick"
13. "Thunder On The Mountain"
14. "Ballad Of A Thin Man"
15. "Like A Rolling Stone"
16. "All Along The Watchtower"
May 11
1. "Leopard-Skin Pill-Box Hat"
2. "To Ramona"
3. "Things Have Changed"
4. "Tangled Up In Blue"
5. "Rollin' and Tumblin'"
6. "Desolation Row"
7. "Cry A While"
8. "Spirit On The Water"
9. "Summer Days"
10. "Love Sick"
11. "Highway 61 Revisited"
12. "Simple Twist Of Fate"
13. "Thunder On The Mountain"
14. "Ballad Of A Thin Man"
15. "Like A Rolling Stone"
16. "All Along The Watchtower"

Encore

17. "Blowin' In The Wind"
May 12
1. "Leopard-Skin Pill-Box Hat"
2. "Don't Think Twice, It's All Right"
3. "Things Have Changed"
4. "Tangled Up In Blue"
5. "Summer Days"
6. "Not Dark Yet"
7. "Jolene"
8. "Ballad Of Hollis Brown"
9. "A Hard Rain's A-Gonna Fall"
10. "The Lonesome Death Of Hattie Carroll"
11. "Highway 61 Revisited"
12. "Forgetful Heart"
13. "Thunder On The Mountain"
14. "Ballad Of A Thin Man"
15. "Like A Rolling Stone"
16. "All Along The Watchtower"

Encore

17. "Blowin' In The Wind"

=== Second leg ===
June 30
1. "Leopard-Skin Pill-Box Hat"
2. "It's All Over Now, Baby Blue"
3. "Things Have Changed"
4. "Tangled Up In Blue"
5. "Cry A While"
6. "Love Sick"
7. "Ballad of Hollis Brown"
8. "Spirit On The Water"
9. "High Water (For Charley Patton)"
10. "A Hard Rain's A-Gonna Fall"
11. "Highway 61 Revisited"
12. "Can't Wait"
13. "Thunder On The Mountain"
14. "Ballad Of A Thin Man"
15. "Like A Rolling Stone"
16. "All Along The Watchtower"
July 2
1. "Leopard-Skin Pill-Box Hat"
2. "It Ain't Me Babe"
3. "Things Have Changed"
4. "Tangled Up In Blue"
5. "Cry A While"
6. "She Belongs To Me"
7. "Love Sick"
8. "The Levee's Gonna Break"
9. "High Water (For Charley Patton)"
10. "Desolation Row"
11. "Highway 61 Revisited"
12. "Simple Twist Of Fate"
13. "Thunder On The Mountain"
14. "Ballad Of A Thin Man"
15. "Like A Rolling Stone"
16. "All Along The Watchtower"

Encore

17. "Blowin' In The Wind"
July 3
1. "Watching The River Flow"*
2. "Under The Red Sky"
3. "Things Have Changed"
4. "Tangled Up In Blue"
5. "Rollin' And Tumblin'"
6. "Sugar Baby"
7. "John Brown"
8. "Visions Of Johanna"
9. "Summer Days"
10. "Blind Willie McTell"
11. "Highway 61 Revisited"
12. "Simple Twist Of Fate"
13. "Thunder On The Mountain"
14. "Ballad Of A Thin Man"
15. "Like A Rolling Stone"
16. "All Along The Watchtower"

Encore

17. "Blowin' In The Wind"
- *The show started with a few lines of "Leopard-Skin Pill-Box Hat" before switching to "Watching The River Flow".
July 4
1. "Just Like Tom Thumb's Blues"
2. "Man In The Long Black Coat"
3. "Things Have Changed"
4. "Tangled Up In Blue"
5. "Rollin' And Tumblin'"
6. "Tryin' To Get To Heaven"
7. "Summer Days"
8. "Spirit On The Water"
9. "High Water (For Charley Patton)"
10. "A Hard Rain's A–Gonna Fall"
11. "Highway 61 Revisited"
12. "Simple Twist Of Fate"
13. "Thunder On The Mountain"
14. "Ballad Of A Thin Man"
15. "Like A Rolling Stone"
16. "All Along The Watchtower"

Encore

17. "Blowin' In The Wind"

July 6
1. "Leopard-Skin Pill-Box Hat"
2. "To Ramona"
3. "Things Have Changed"
4. "Tangled Up In Blue"
5. "Honest With Me"
6. "Sugar Baby"
7. "The Levee's Gonna Break"
8. "Make You Feel My Love"
9. "High Water (For Charley Patton)"
10. "Desolation Row"
11. "Highway 61 Revisited"
12. "Love Sick"
13. "Thunder On The Mountain"
14. "Ballad Of A Thin Man"
15. "Like A Rolling Stone"
16. "All Along The Watchtower"

Encore

17. "Blowin' In The Wind"
July 7
1. "Watching The River Flow"
2. "Don't Think Twice, It's All Right"
3. "Things Have Changed"
4. "Tangled Up In Blue"
5. "Tweedle Dee & Tweedle Dum"
6. "Every Grain Of Sand"
7. "Ballad Of Hollis Brown"
8. "The Lonesome Death Of Hattie Carroll"
9. "High Water (For Charley Patton)"
10. "Visions Of Johanna"
11. "Highway 61 Revisited"
12. "Can't Wait"
13. "Thunder On The Mountain"
14. "Ballad Of A Thin Man"
15. "Like A Rolling Stone"
16. "All Along The Watchtower"

Encore

17. "Blowin' In The Wind"
July 8
1. "Leopard-Skin Pill-Box Hat"
2. "My Back Pages"
3. "Things Have Changed"
4. "Tangled Up In Blue"
5. "Rollin' And Tumblin'"
6. "Tryin' To Get To Heaven"
7. "Summer Days"
8. "Simple Twist Of Fate"
9. "High Water (For Charley Patton)"
10. "Visions Of Johanna"
11. "Highway 61 Revisited"
12. "Forgetful Heart"
13. "Thunder On The Mountain"
14. "Ballad Of A Thin Man"
15. "Like A Rolling Stone"
16. "All Along The Watchtower"

Encore

17. "Blowin' In The Wind"
July 11
1. "Leopard-Skin Pill-Box Hat"
2. "Man In The Long Black Coat"
3. "Things Have Changed"
4. "Tangled Up In Blue"
5. "Rollin' and Tumblin'"
6. "Spirit On The Water"
7. "Summer Days"
8. "A Hard Rain's A-Gonna Fall"
9. "High Water (For Charley Patton)"
10. "Simple Twist Of Fate"
11. "Highway 61 Revisited"
12. "Can't Wait"
13. "Thunder On The Mountain"
14. "Ballad Of A Thin Man"
15. "Like A Rolling Stone"
16. "All Along The Watchtower"

Encore

17. "Blowin' In The Wind"

July 13
1. "Leopard-Skin Pill-Box Hat"
2. "To Ramona"
3. "Things Have Changed"
4. "Tangled Up In Blue"
5. "Honest With Me"
6. "Make You Feel My Love"
7. "The Levee's Gonna Break"
8. "Desolation Row"
9. "High Water (For Charley Patton)"
10. "Spirit On The Water"
11. "Highway 61 Revisited"
12. "Simple Twist Of Fate"
13. "Thunder On The Mountain"
14. "Ballad Of A Thin Man"

Encore

15. "Like a Rolling Stone"
July 14
1. "Leopard-Skin Pill-Box Hat"
2. "To Ramona"
3. "Things Have Changed"
4. "Tangled Up In Blue"
5. "The Levee's Gonna Break"
6. "Every Grain Of Sand"
7. "Ballad Of Hollis Brown"
8. "The Lonesome Death Of Hattie Carroll"
9. "Rollin' and Tumblin'"
10. "Visions Of Johanna"
11. "Highway 61 Revisited"
12. "Simple Twist Of Fate"
13. "Thunder On The Mountain"
14. "Ballad Of A Thin Man"
15. "Like A Rolling Stone"
16. "All Along The Watchtower"

Encore

17. "Blowin' In The Wind"
July 15
1. "Leopard-Skin Pill-Box Hat"
2. "Don't Think Twice, It's All Right"
3. "Things Have Changed"
4. "Tangled Up In Blue"
5. "Rollin' and Tumblin'"
6. "Trying To Get To Heaven"
7. "Summer Days"
8. "Sugar Baby"
9. "Tweedle Dee & Tweedle Dum"
10. "Visions Of Johanna"
11. "Highway 61 Revisited"
12. "Simple Twist Of Fate"
13. "Thunder On The Mountain"
14. "Ballad Of A Thin Man"
15. "Like A Rolling Stone"
16. "All Along The Watchtower"

Encore

17. "Blowin' In The Wind"
July 16
1. "Leopard-Skin Pill-Box Hat"
2. "It's All Over Now, Baby Blue"
3. "Things Have Changed"
4. "Tangled Up In Blue"
5. "Honest With Me"
6. "Spirit On The Water"
7. "The Levee's Gonna Break"
8. "A Hard Rain's A-Gonna Fall"
9. "High Water (For Charley Patton)"
10. "Simple Twist Of Fate"
11. "I'll Be Your Baby Tonight"
12. "Highway 61 Revisited"
13. "Forgetful Heart"
14. "Thunder On The Mountain"
15. "Ballad Of A Thin Man"
16. "Like A Rolling Stone"
17. "All Along The Watchtower"

Encore

18. "Blowin' In The Wind"

July 18
1. "Absolutely Sweet Marie"
2. "Man In The Long Black Coat"
3. "Things Have Changed"
4. "Tangled Up In Blue"
5. "Rollin' and Tumblin'"
6. "Desolation Row"
7. "High Water (For Charley Patton)"
8. "Sugar Baby"
9. "Tweedle Dee & Tweedle Dum"
10. "Forgetful Heart"
11. "Highway 61 Revisited"
12. "Blind Willie McTell"
13. "Thunder On The Mountain"
14. "Ballad Of A Thin Man"
15. "Like A Rolling Stone"
16. "All Along The Watchtower"

Encore

17. "Blowin' In The Wind"
July 20
1. "Leopard-Skin Pill-Box Hat"
2. "Love Minus Zero, No Limit"
3. "Things Have Changed"
4. "Tangled Up In Blue"
5. "Tweedle Dee & Tweedle Dum"
6. "Desolation Row"
7. "The Levee's Gonna Break"
8. "Make You Feel My Love"
9. "Honest With Me"
10. "Spirit On The Water"
11. "Highway 61 Revisited"
12. "Forgetful Heart"
13. "Thunder On The Mountain"
14. "Ballad Of A Thin Man"
15. "Like A Rolling Stone"
16. "All Along The Watchtower"

Encore

17. "Blowin' In The Wind"
July 21
1. "Leopard-Skin Pill-Box Hat"
2. "This Wheel's On Fire"
3. "Things Have Changed"
4. "Tangled Up In Blue"
5. "Summer Days"
6. "Sugar Baby"
7. "Rollin' And Tumblin'"
8. "A Hard Rain's A-Gonna Fall"
9. "Highway 61 Revisited"
10. "Simple Twist Of Fate"
11. "Thunder On The Mountain"
12. "Ballad Of A Thin Man"
13. "Like A Rolling Stone"
14. "All Along The Watchtower"

Encore

15. "Blowin' In The Wind"

=== Third leg ===
August 10
1. "Leopard-Skin Pill-Box Hat"
2. "Don't Think Twice, It's All Right"
3. "Things Have Changed"
4. "Tangled Up In Blue"
5. "Rollin' and Tumblin'"
6. "Sugar Baby"
7. "Tweedle Dee & Tweedle Dum"
8. "Trying To Get To Heaven"
9. "Summer Days"
10. "Desolation Row"
11. "Highway 61 Revisited"
12. "Simple Twist Of Fate"
13. "Thunder On The Mountain"
14. "Ballad Of A Thin Man"
15. "Like A Rolling Stone"
16. "All Along The Watchtower"

Encore

17. "Blowin' In The Wind"
August 11
1. "Lopard-Skin Pill-Box Hat"
2. "To Ramona"
3. "Things Have Changed"
4. "Tangled Up In Blue"
5. "Tweedle Dee & Tweedle Dum"
6. "Love Sick"
7. "Ballad Of Hollis Brown"
8. "The Lonesome Death Of Hattie Carroll"
9. "The Levee's Gonna Break"
10. "High Water (For Charley Patton)"
11. "A Hard Rain's A-Gonna Fall"
12. "Highway 61 Revisited"
13. "Simple Twist Of Fate"
14. "Thunder On The Mountain"
15. "Ballad Of A Thin Man"
16. "Like A Rolling Stone"
17. "All Along The Watchtower"

Encore

18. "Blowin' In The Wind"
August 12
1. "Leopard-Skin Pill-Box Hat"
2. "Girl From The North Country"
3. "Things Have Changed"
4. "Tangled Up In Blue"
5. "Rollin' and Tumblin'"
6. "Sugar Baby"
7. "Honest With Me"
8. "Trying To Get To Heaven"
9. "Summer Days"
10. "Desolation Row"
11. "Highway 61 Revisited"
12. "Simple Twist Of Fate"
13. "Thunder On The Mountain"
14. "Ballad Of A Thin Man"
15. "Like A Rolling Stone"
16. "All Along The Watchtower"

Encore

17. "Blowin' In The Wind"
August 14
1. "Leopard-Skin Pill-Box Hat"
2. "Love Minus Zero, No Limit"
3. "Things Have Changed"
4. "Tangled Up In Blue"
5. "Tweedle Dee & Tweedle Dum"
6. "Visions Of Johanna"
7. "Summer Days"
8. "Spirit On The Water"
9. "Honest With Me"
10. "John Brown"
11. "Highway 61 Revisited"
12. "Simple Twist Of Fate"
13. "Thunder On The Mountain"
14. "Ballad Of A Thin Man"
15. "Like A Rolling Stone"
16. "All Along The Watchtower"

Encore

17. "Blowin' In The Wind"

August 17
1. "Leopard-Skin Pill-Box Hat"
2. "To Ramona"
3. "Things Have Changed"
4. "Tangled Up in Blue"
5. "Rollin' and Tumblin'"
6. "Love Sick"
7. "Tweedle Dee & Tweedle Dum"
8. "Desolation Row"
9. "The Levee's Gonna Break"
10. "High Water (For Charley Patton)"
11. "Highway 61 Revisited"
12. "Simple Twist Of Fate"
13. "Thunder On The Mountain"
14. "Ballad Of A Thin Man"
15. "Like A Rolling Stone"
16. "All Along The Watchtower"

Encore

17. "Blowin' In The Wind"
August 18
1. "Leopard-Skin Pill-Box Hat"
2. "Don't Think Twice, It's All Right"
3. "Things Have Changed"
4. "Tangled Up In Blue"
5. "Summer Days"
6. "The Lonesome Death Of Hattie Carroll"
7. "High Water (For Charley Patton)"
8. "A Hard Rain's A-Gonna Fall"
9. "Honest With Me"
10. "This Dream Of You"
11. "Highway 61 Revisited"
12. "Simple Twist Of Fate"
13. "Thunder On The Mountain"
14. "Ballad Of A Thin Man"
15. "Like A Rolling Stone"
16. "All Along The Watchtower"

Encore

17. "Blowin' In The Wind"
August 19
1. "Leopard-Skin Pill-Box Hat"
2. "Girl From the North Country"
3. "Things Have Changed"
4. "Tangled Up in Blue"
5. "Tweedle Dee & Tweedle Dum"
6. "Tryin' to Get to Heaven"
7. "Rollin' and Tumblin'"
8. "Sugar Baby"
9. "Summer Days"
10. "Desolation Row"
11. "Highway 61 Revisited"
12. "Simple Twist of Fate"
13. "Thunder on the Mountain"
14. "Ballad of a Thin Man"
15. "Like a Rolling Stone"
16. "All Along the Watchtower"

Encore

17. "Blowin' In The Wind"
August 21
1. "Leopard-Skin Pill-Box Hat"
2. "Love Minus Zero, No Limit"
3. "Things Have Changed"
4. "Tangled Up In Blue"
5. "Tweedle Dee & Tweedle Dum"
6. "John Brown"
7. "Summer Days"
8. "Spirit On The Water"
9. "Rollin' and Tumblin'"
10. "Visions of Johanna"
11. "Highway 61 Revisited"
12. "Simple Twist of Fate"
13. "Thunder on the Mountain"
14. "Ballad of a Thin Man"
15. "Like a Rolling Stone"
16. "All Along the Watchtower"

Encore

17. "Blowin' In The Wind"

August 22
1. "Leopard-Skin Pill-Box Hat"
2. "Man in the Long Black Coat"
3. "Things Have Changed"
4. "Tangled Up In Blue"
5. "Tweedle Dee & Tweedle Dum"
6. "Sugar Baby"
7. "Summer Days"
8. "Visions of Johanna"
9. "High Water (For Charley Patton)"
10. "Simple Twist of Fate"
11. "Highway 61 Revisited"
12. "Can't Wait"
13. "Thunder on the Mountain"
14. "Ballad of a Thin Man"
15. "Like a Rolling Stone"
16. "All Along the Watchtower"

Encore

17. "Blowin' In The Wind"
August 24
1. "Leopard-Skin Pill-Box Hat"
2. "Girl From The North Country"
3. "Beyond Here Lies Nothin'"
4. "Tangled Up In Blue"
5. "Rollin' and Tumblin'"
6. "Make You Feel My Love"
7. "Tweedle Dee & Tweedle Dum"
8. "Visions of Johanna"
9. "The Levee's Gonna Break"
10. "Forgetful Heart"
11. "Highway 61 Revisited"
12. "Simple Twist of Fate"
13. "Thunder on the Mountain"
14. "Ballad of a Thin Man"
15. "Like a Rolling Stone"
16. "All Along the Watchtower"

Encore

17. "Blowin' In The Wind"
August 25
1. "Leopard-Skin Pill-Box Hat"
2. "To Ramona"
3. "Things Have Changed"
4. "Tangled Up In Blue"
5. "Rollin' and Tumblin'"
6. "Sugar Baby"
7. "Tweedle Dee & Tweedle Dum"
8. "The Lonesome Death of Hattie Carroll"
9. "Summer Days"
10. "Visions of Johanna"
11. "Highway 61 Revisited"
12. "Simple Twist of Fate"
13. "Thunder on the Mountain"
14. "Ballad of a Thin Man"
15. "Like a Rolling Stone"
16. "All Along the Watchtower"

Encore

17. "Blowin' In The Wind"
August 26
1. "Leopard-Skin Pill-Box Hat"
2. "It's All Over Now, Baby Blue"
3. "Things Have Changed"
4. "Tangled Up in Blue"
5. "Honest With Me"
6. "Blind Willie McTell"
7. "Tweedle Dee & Tweedle Dum"
8. "Spirit on the Water"
9. "High Water (For Charley Patton)"
10. "Visions of Johanna"
11. "Highway 61 Revisited"
12. "Tryin' to Get to Heaven"
13. "Thunder on the Mountain"
14. "Ballad of a Thin Man"
15. "Like a Rolling Stone"
16. "All Along the Watchtower"

Encore

17. "Blowin' In The Wind"

August 28
1. "Leopard-Skin Pill-Box Hat"
2. "Don't Think Twice, It's All Right"
3. "Things Have Changed"
4. "Tangled Up In Blue"
5. "Rollin' and Tumblin'"
6. "Sugar Baby"
7. "John Brown"
8. "Love Sick"
9. "Summer Days"
10. "Visions of Johanna"
11. "Highway 61 Revisited"
12. "Simple Twist of Fate"
13. "Thunder on the Mountain"
14. "Ballad of a Thin Man"
15. "Like a Rolling Stone"
16. "All Along the Watchtower"

Encore

17. "Blowin' In The Wind"
August 29
1. "Leopard-Skin Pill-Box Hat"
2. "Man In The Long Black Coat"
3. "Things Have Changed"
4. "Tangled Up In Blue"
5. "Jolene"
6. "Saving Grace"
7. "High Water (For Charley Patton)"
8. "Desolation Row"
9. "Summer Days"
10. "Can't Wait"
11. "Highway 61 Revisited"
12. "Blind Willie McTell"
13. "Thunder on the Mountain"
14. "Ballad of a Thin Man"
15. "Like a Rolling Stone"
16. "All Along the Watchtower"

Encore

17. "Blowin' In The Wind"
August 30
1. "Leopard-Skin Pill-Box Hat"
2. "Girl Of The North Country"
3. "Things Have Changed"
4. "Tangled Up In Blue"
5. "The Levee's Gonna Break"
6. "This Dream Of You"
7. "High Water (For Charley Patton)"
8. "Sugar Baby"
9. "Tweedle Dee & Tweedle Dum"
10. "A Hard Rain's A-Gonna Fall"
11. "Highway 61 Revisited"
12. "Forgetful Heart"
13. "Thunder On The Mountain"
14. "Ballad Of A Thin Man"
15. "Like A Rolling Stone"
16. "All Along The Watchtower"

Encore

17. "Blowin' In The Wind"
September 1
1. "Watching the River Flow"
2. "To Ramona"
3. "Things Have Changed"
4. "Tangled Up in Blue"
5. "Rollin' and Tumblin'"
6. "Every Grain of Sand"
7. "Tweedle Dee & Tweedle Dum"
8. "The Lonesome Death of Hattie Carroll"
9. "Summer Days"
10. "Visions of Johanna"
11. "Highway 61 Revisited"
12. "Spirit on the Water"
13. "Thunder on the Mountain"
14. "Ballad of a Thin Man"
15. "Like a Rolling Stone"
16. "All Along the Watchtower"

Encore

17. "Blowin' In The Wind"

September 2
1. "Watching The River Flow"
2. "It's All Over Now, Baby Blue"
3. "Things Have Changed"
4. "Tangled Up In Blue"
5. "The Levee's Gonna Break"
6. "Blind Willie McTell"
7. "Tweedle Dee & Tweedle Dum"
8. "Tryin' To Get To Heaven"
9. "High Water (For Charley Patton)"
10. "Visions of Johanna"
11. "Highway 61 Revisited"
12. "Spirit on the Water"
13. "Thunder on the Mountain"
14. "Ballad of a Thin Man"
15. "Like a Rolling Stone"
16. "All Along the Watchtower"

Encore

17. "Blowin' In The Wind"
September 4
1. "Watching the River Flow"
2. "Love Minus Zero/No Limit"
3. "Things Have Changed"
4. "Tangled Up in Blue"
5. "Rollin' and Tumblin'"
6. "This Dream of You"
7. "Tweedle Dee & Tweedle Dum"
8. "Shooting Star"
9. "High Water (For Charley Patton)"
10. "Visions Of Johanna"
11. "Highway 61 Revisited"
12. "Can't Wait"
13. "Thunder On The Mountain"
14. "Ballad Of A Thin Man"
15. "Like A Rolling Stone"
16. "All Along The Watchtower"

Encore

17. "Blowin' In The Wind"
September 6
1. "Watching the River Flow"
2. "It Ain't Me, Babe"
3. "Things Have Changed"
4. "Tangled Up in Blue"
5. "Beyond Here Lies Nothin'"
6. "This Dream of You"
7. "Jolene"
8. "Love Sick"
9. "Tweedle Dee & Tweedle Dum"
10. "A Hard Rain's A–Gonna Fall"
11. "Highway 61 Revisited"
12. "Simple Twist Of Fate"
13. "Thunder On The Mountain"
14. "Ballad Of A Thin Man"
15. "Like A Rolling Stone"
16. "All Along The Watchtower"

Encore

17. "Blowin' In The Wind"
September 7
1. "Watching the River Flow"
2. "Don't Think Twice, It's All Right"
3. "Things Have Changed"
4. "Tangled Up in Blue"
5. "The Levee's Gonna Break"
6. "Make You Feel My Love"
7. "Honest With Me"
8. "Every Grain of Sand"
9. "High Water (For Charley Patton)"
10. "Desolation Row"
11. "Highway 61 Revisited"
12. "Shelter From the Storm"
13. "Thunder on the Mountain"
14. "Ballad of a Thin Man"
15. "Like a Rolling Stone"
16. "All Along the Watchtower"

Encore

17. "Blowin' In The Wind"

September 8
1. "You Ain't Goin' Nowhere"
2. "Just Like Tom Thumb's Blues"
3. "Things Have Changed"
4. "Tangled Up in Blue"
5. "Summer Days"
6. "Not Dark Yet"
7. "Jolene"
8. "The Lonesome Death of Hattie Carroll"
9. "High Water (For Charley Patton)"
10. "Visions of Johanna"
11. "Highway 61 Revisited"
12. "Simple Twist Of Fate"
13. "Thunder On The Mountain"
14. "Ballad Of A Thin Man"
15. "Like A Rolling Stone"
16. "All Along The Watchtower"

Encore

17. "Blowin' In The Wind"
September 9
1. "I'll Be Your Baby Tonight"
2. "Man in the Long Black Coat"
3. "Things Have Changed"
4. "Tangled Up in Blue"
5. "Tweedle Dee & Tweedle Dum"
6. "This Dream of You"
7. "Honest With Me"
8. "Tryin' to Get to Heaven"
9. "High Water (For Charley Patton)"
10. "Visions of Johanna"
11. "Highway 61 Revisited"
12. "Simple Twist Of Fate"
13. "Thunder On The Mountain"
14. "Ballad Of A Thin Man"
15. "Like A Rolling Stone"
16. "All Along The Watchtower"

Encore

17. "Blowin' In The Wind"

=== Fourth leg ===
October 5
1. "Watching the River Flow"
2. "It Ain't Me, Babe"
3. "Things Have Changed"
4. "Tangled Up in Blue"
5. "Tweedle Dee & Tweedle Dum"
6. "This Dream of You"
7. "Summer Days"
8. "Desolation Row"
9. "Highway 61 Revisited"
10. "Scarlet Town"
11. "Thunder on the Mountain"
12. "Ballad of a Thin Man"
13. "Like a Rolling Stone"
14. "All Along the Watchtower"

Encore

15. "Blowin' In The Wind"
October 6
1. "Watching the River Flow"
2. "Girl From the North Country"
3. "Things Have Changed"
4. "Tangled Up in Blue"
5. "Ballad of Hollis Brown"
6. "The Lonesome Death of Hattie Carroll"
7. "The Levee's Gonna Break"
8. "A Hard Rain's A-Gonna Fall"
9. "Highway 61 Revisited"
10. "Simple Twist of Fate"
11. "Thunder on the Mountain"
12. "Ballad of a Thin Man"
13. "Like a Rolling Stone"
14. "All Along the Watchtower"

Encore

15. "Blowin' In The Wind"
October 8
1. "Watching the River Flow"
2. "Man in the Long Black Coat"
3. "Things Have Changed"
4. "Tangled Up in Blue"
5. "The Levee's Gonna Break"
6. "Shelter From the Storm"
7. "High Water (For Charley Patton)"
8. "Visions of Johanna"
9. "Highway 61 Revisited"
10. "Ain't Talkin'"
11. "Thunder on the Mountain"
12. "Ballad of a Thin Man"
13. "Like a Rolling Stone"
14. "All Along the Watchtower"

Encore

15. "Blowin' In The Wind"
October 9
1. "Watching the River Flow"
2. "Love Minus Zero/No Limit"
3. "Things Have Changed"
4. "Tangled Up in Blue"
5. "John Brown"
6. "Mississippi"
7. "Summer Days"
8. "Nettie Moore"
9. "Highway 61 Revisited"
10. "Shadows"
11. "Thunder on the Mountain"
12. "Ballad of a Thin Man"
13. "Like a Rolling Stone"
14. "All Along the Watchtower"

Encore

15. "Blowin' In The Wind"

October 10
1. "Watching the River Flow"
2. "It Ain't Me, Babe"
3. "Things Have Changed"
4. "Tangled Up in Blue"
5. "Honest With Me"
6. "Joey"
7. "Beyond Here Lies Nothin'"
8. "Visions of Johanna"
9. "Highway 61 Revisited"
10. "Simple Twist of Fate"
11. "Thunder on the Mountain"
12. "Ballad of a Thin Man"
13. "Like a Rolling Stone"
14. "All Along the Watchtower"

Encore

15. "Blowin' In The Wind"
October 12
1. "Watching the River Flow"
2. "To Ramona"
3. "Things Have Changed"
4. "Tangled Up in Blue"
5. "Cry a While"
6. "Make You Feel My Love"
7. "High Water (For Charley Patton)"
8. "Desolation Row"
9. "Highway 61 Revisited"
10. "Love Sick"
11. "Thunder on the Mountain"
12. "Ballad of a Thin Man"
13. "Like a Rolling Stone"
14. "All Along the Watchtower

Encore

15. "Blowin' In The Wind"
October 13
1. "Watching the River Flow"
2. "To Ramona"
3. "Things Have Changed"
4. "Tangled Up in Blue"
5. "Cry a While"
6. "The Lonesome Death of Hattie Carroll"
7. "Ballad of Hollis Brown"
8. "Mississippi"
9. "Highway 61 Revisited"
10. "Visions of Johanna"
11. "Thunder on the Mountain"
12. "Ballad of a Thin Man"
13. "Like a Rolling Stone"
14. "All Along the Watchtower"

Encore

15. "Blowin' In The Wind"
October 15
1. "Watching the River Flow"
2. "It's All Over Now, Baby Blue"
3. "Things Have Changed"
4. "Tangled Up in Blue"
5. "Cry a While"
6. "Spirit on the Water"
7. "High Water (For Charley Patton)"
8. "Chimes of Freedom"
9. "Highway 61 Revisited"
10. "Desolation Row"
11. "Thunder on the Mountain"
12. "Ballad of a Thin Man"
13. "Like a Rolling Stone"
14. "All Along the Watchtower"

Encore

15. "Blowin' In The Wind"

October 17
1. "Watching the River Flow"
2. "Man in the Long Black Coat"
3. "Things Have Changed"
4. "Tangled Up in Blue"
5. "Cry a While"
6. "Joey"
7. "Beyond Here Lies Nothin'"
8. "Visions of Johanna"
9. "Highway 61 Revisited"
10. "Forgetful Heart"
11. "Thunder on the Mountain"
12. "Ballad of a Thin Man"
13. "Like a Rolling Stone"
14. "All Along the Watchtower"

Encore

15. "Blowin' In The Wind"
October 18
1. "Watching the River Flow"
2. "Love Minus Zero/No Limit"
3. "Things Have Changed"
4. "Tangled Up in Blue"
5. "Tweedle Dee & Tweedle Dum"
6. "A Hard Rain's A-Gonna Fall"
7. "High Water (For Charley Patton)"
8. "Chimes of Freedom"
9. "Highway 61 Revisited"
10. "Love Sick"
11. "Thunder On The Mountain"
12. "Ballad Of A Thin Man"
13. "Like A Rolling Stone"
14. "All Along The Watchtower"

Encore

15. "Blowin' In The Wind"
October 19
1. "Watching the River Flow"
2. "To Ramona"
3. "Things Have Changed"
4. "Tangled Up in Blue"
5. "Cry a While"
6. "Make You Feel My Love"
7. "The Levee's Gonna Break"
8. "Shelter From The Storm"
9. "Highway 61 Revisited"
10. "Desolation Row"
11. "Thunder on the Mountain"
12. "Ballad of a Thin Man"
13. "Like a Rolling Stone"
14. "All Along the Watchtower"

Encore

15. "Blowin' In The Wind"
October 20
1. "You Ain't Goin' Nowhere"
2. "Girl From the North Country"
3. "Things Have Changed"
4. "Tangled Up in Blue"
5. "Tweedle Dee & Tweedle Dum"
6. "The Lonesome Death of Hattie Carroll"
7. "Ballad of Hollis Brown"
8. "Mississippi"
9. "Highway 61 Revisited"
10. "Ain't Talkin'"
11. "Thunder on the Mountain"
12. "Ballad of a Thin Man"
13. "Like a Rolling Stone"
14. "All Along the Watchtower"

Encore

15. "Blowin' In The Wind"

October 22
1. "Watching The River Flow"
2. "Man In The Long Black Coat"
3. "Things Have Changed"
4. "Tangled Up In Blue"
5. "Cry A While"
6. "A Hard Rain's A-Gonna Fall"
7. "High Water (For Charley Patton)"
8. "Chimes Of Freedom"
9. "Highway 61 Revisited"
10. "Mississippi"
11. "Thunder On The Mountain"
12. "Ballad Of A Thin Man"
13. "Like A Rolling Stone"
14. "All Along The Watchtower"

Encore

15. "Blowin' In The Wind"
October 24
1. "You Ain't Goin' Nowhere"
2. "It Ain't Me, Babe"
3. "Things Have Changed"
4. "Tangled Up in Blue"
5. "Cry a While"
6. "Joey"
7. "Summer Days"
8. "Visions of Johanna"
9. "Highway 61 Revisited"
10. "Forgetful Heart"
11. "Thunder on the Mountain"
12. "Ballad of a Thin Man"
13. "Like a Rolling Stone"
14. "All Along the Watchtower"

Encore

15. "Blowin' In The Wind"
October 26
1. "You Ain't Goin' Nowhere"
2. "To Ramona"
3. "Things Have Changed"
4. "Tangled Up in Blue"
5. "The Levee's Gonna Break"
6. "Make You Feel My Love"
7. "Cry a While"
8. "Desolation Row"
9. "Highway 61 Revisited"
10. "Love Sick"
11. "Thunder On The Mountain"
12. "Ballad Of A Thin Man"
13. "Like A Rolling Stone"
14. "All Along The Watchtower"

Encore

15. "Blowin' In The Wind"
October 27
1. "You Ain't Goin' Nowhere"
2. "Girl From The North Country"
3. "Things Have Changed"
4. "Tangled Up In Blue"
5. "Beyond Here Lies Nothin'"
6. "Every Grain Of Sand"
7. "Tweedle Dee & Tweedle Dum"
8. "Delia"
9. "Highway 61 Revisited"
10. "Mississippi"
11. "Thunder On The Mountain"
12. "Ballad Of A Thin Man"
13. "Like A Rolling Stone"
14. "All Along The Watchtower"

Encore

15. "Blowin' In The Wind"

October 29
1. "I'll Be Your Baby Tonight"
2. "It's All Over Now, Baby Blue"
3. "Things Have Changed"
4. "Tangled Up In Blue"
5. "The Levee's Gonna Break"
6. "Shelter From The Storm"
7. "High Water (For Charley Patton)"
8. "A Hard Rain's A-Gonna Fall"
9. "Highway 61 Revisited"
10. "Tryin' To Get To Heaven"
11. "Thunder On The Mountain"
12. "Ballad Of A Thin Man"
13. "Like A Rolling Stone"
14. "All Along The Watchtower"

Encore

15. "Blowin' In The Wind"
October 30
1. "I'll Be Your Baby Tonight"
2. "Love Minus Zero/No Limit"
3. "Things Have Changed"
4. "Tangled Up in Blue"
5. "Rollin' and Tumblin'"
6. "Visions of Johanna"
7. "John Brown"
8. "Mississippi"
9. "Highway 61 Revisited"
10. "Ain't Talkin'"
11. "Thunder On The Mountain"
12. "Ballad Of A Thin Man"
13. "Like A Rolling Stone"
14. "All Along The Watchtower"

Encore

15. "Blowin' In The Wind"
November 1
1. "Watching the River Flow"
2. "Girl From the North Country"
3. "Things Have Changed"
4. "Tangled Up in Blue"
5. "Tweedle Dee & Tweedle Dum"
6. "A Hard Rain's A-Gonna Fall"
7. "Dignity"
8. "Love Sick"
9. "Highway 61 Revisited"
10. "Mississippi"
11. "Thunder On The Mountain"
12. "Ballad Of A Thin Man"
13. "Like A Rolling Stone"
14. "All Along The Watchtower"

Encore

15. "Blowin' In The Wind"
November 2
1. "You Ain't Goin' Nowhere"
2. "Don't Think Twice, It's All Right"
3. "Things Have Changed"
4. "Tangled Up in Blue"
5. "Cry a While"
6. "Make You Feel My Love"
7. "Honest With Me"
8. "Desolation Row"
9. "Highway 61 Revisited"
10. "Ain't Talkin'"
11. "Thunder On The Mountain"
12. "Ballad Of A Thin Man"
13. "Like A Rolling Stone"
14. "All Along The Watchtower"

Encore

15. "Blowin' In The Wind"

November 3
1. "I'll Be Your Baby Tonight"
2. "To Ramona"
3. "Things Have Changed"
4. "Tangled Up in Blue"
5. "Beyond Here Lies Nothin'"
6. "Every Grain of Sand"
7. "The Levee's Gonna Break"
8. "Blind Willie McTell"
9. "Highway 61 Revisited"
10. "Visions of Johanna"
11. "Thunder On The Mountain"
12. "Ballad Of A Thin Man"
13. "Like A Rolling Stone"
14. "All Along The Watchtower"

Encore

15. "Blowin' In The Wind"
November 5
1. "I'll Be Your Baby Tonight"
2. "Man In The Long Black Coat"
3. "Things Have Changed"
4. "Tangled Up In Blue"
5. "Rollin' And Tumblin'"
6. "A Hard Rain's A-Gonna Fall"
7. "Tweedle Dee & Tweedle Dum"
8. "Chimes Of Freedom"
9. "Highway 61 Revisited"
10. "When The Deal Goes Down"
11. "Thunder On The Mountain"
12. "Ballad Of A Thin Man"
13. "Like A Rolling Stone"
14. "All Along The Watchtower"

Encore

15. "Blowin' In The Wind"
November 7
1. "I'll Be Your Baby Tonight"
2. "Don't Think Twice, It's All Right"
3. "Things Have Changed"
4. "Tangled Up in Blue"
5. "Early Roman Kings"
6. "A Hard Rain's A-Gonna Fall"
7. "Summer Days"
8. "Blind Willie McTell"
9. "Highway 61 Revisited"
10. "Spirit on the Water"
11. "Thunder On The Mountain"
12. "Ballad Of A Thin Man"
13. "Like A Rolling Stone"
14. "All Along The Watchtower"

Encore

15. "Blowin' In The Wind"
November 8
1. "Watching the River Flow"
2. "Girl From the North Country"
3. "Things Have Changed"
4. "Tangled Up in Blue"
5. "Million Miles"
6. "Chimes of Freedom"
7. "Rollin' and Tumblin'"
8. "Love Sick"
9. "Highway 61 Revisited"
10. "Ain't Talkin'"
11. "Thunder on the Mountain"
12. "Ballad of a Thin Man"
13. "Like a Rolling Stone"
14. "All Along the Watchtower"

Encore

15. "Blowin' In The Wind"

November 9
1. "Sweet Home Chicago"
2. "To Ramona"
3. "Things Have Changed"
4. "Tangled Up in Blue"
5. "Blind Willie McTell"
6. "Make You Feel My Love"
7. "The Levee's Gonna Break"
8. "Desolation Row"
9. "Highway 61 Revisited"
10. "Forgetful Heart"
11. "Thunder on the Mountain"
12. "Ballad of a Thin Man"
13. "Like a Rolling Stone"
14. "All Along the Watchtower"

Encore

15. "Blowin' In The Wind"
November 12
1. "You Ain't Goin' Nowhere"
2. "It's All Over Now, Baby Blue"
3. "Things Have Changed"
4. "Tangled Up in Blue"
5. "Rollin' and Tumblin'"
6. "Visions of Johanna"
7. "High Water (For Charley Patton)"
8. "Spirit on the Water"
9. "Highway 61 Revisited"
10. "Mississippi"
11. "Thunder on the Mountain"
12. "Ballad of a Thin Man"
13. "Like a Rolling Stone"
14. "All Along the Watchtower"

Encore

15. "Blowin' In The Wind"
November 13
1. "I'll Be Your Baby Tonight"
2. "Don't Think Twice, It's All Right"
3. "Things Have Changed"
4. "Tangled Up in Blue"
5. "Beyond Here Lies Nothin'"
6. "A Hard Rain's A-Gonna Fall"
7. "Pay in Blood"
8. "Love Sick"
9. "Highway 61 Revisited"
10. "Mississippi"
11. "Thunder on the Mountain"
12. "Ballad of a Thin Man"
13. "Like a Rolling Stone"
14. "All Along the Watchtower"

Encore

15. "Blowin' In The Wind"
November 14
1. "You Ain't Goin' Nowhere"
2. "Man in the Long Black Coat"
3. "Things Have Changed"
4. "Tangled Up in Blue"
5. "Early Roman Kings"
6. "Joey"
7. "Rollin' and Tumblin'"
8. "Visions of Johanna"
9. "Highway 61 Revisited"
10. "Sugar Baby"
11. "Thunder on the Mountain"
12. "Ballad of a Thin Man"
13. "Like a Rolling Stone"
14. "All Along the Watchtower"

Encore

15. "Blowin' In The Wind"

November 16
1. "I'll Be Your Baby Tonight"
2. "Girl From the North Country"
3. "Things Have Changed"
4. "Tangled Up in Blue"
5. "Early Roman Kings"
6. "Make You Feel My Love"
7. "Tweedle Dee & Tweedle Dum"
8. "Desolation Row"
9. "Highway 61 Revisited"
10. "Forgetful Heart"
11. "Thunder on the Mountain"
12. "Ballad of a Thin Man"
13. "Like a Rolling Stone"
14. "All Along the Watchtower"

Encore

15. "Blowin' In The Wind"
November 18
1. "I'll Be Your Baby Tonight"
2. "Don't Think Twice, It's All Right"
3. "Things Have Changed"
4. "Tangled Up In Blue"
5. "Early Roman Kings"
6. "Tryin' To Get To Heaven"
7. "Summer Days"
8. "Visions Of Johanna"
9. "Highway 61 Revisited"
10. "Forgetful Heart"
11. "Thunder on the Mountain"
12. "Ballad of a Thin Man"
13. "Like a Rolling Stone"
14. "All Along the Watchtower"

Encore

15. "Blowin' In The Wind"
November 19
1. "You Ain't Goin' Nowhere"
2. "It's All Over Now, Baby Blue"
3. "Things Have Changed"
4. "Tangled Up in Blue"
5. "Early Roman Kings"
6. "Chimes of Freedom"
7. "Rollin' and Tumblin'"
8. "Desolation Row"
9. "Highway 61 Revisited"
10. "Mississippi"
11. "Thunder on the Mountain"
12. "Ballad of a Thin Man"
13. "Like a Rolling Stone"
14. "All Along the Watchtower"

Encore

15. "Blowin' In The Wind"
November 20
1. "I'll Be Your Baby Tonight"
2. "To Ramona"
3. "Things Have Changed"
4. "Tangled Up in Blue"
5. "Early Roman Kings"
6. "Chimes of Freedom"
7. "Summer Days"
8. "A Hard Rain's A-Gonna Fall"
9. "Highway 61 Revisited"
10. "Soon After Midnight"
11. "Thunder on the Mountain"
12. "Ballad of a Thin Man"
13. "Like a Rolling Stone"
14. "All Along the Watchtower"

Encore

15. "Blowin' In The Wind"

November 21
1. "You Ain't Goin' Nowhere"
2. "Don't Think Twice, It's All Right"
3. "Things Have Changed"
4. "Tangled Up in Blue"
5. "Early Roman Kings"
6. "Chimes of Freedom"
7. "The Levee's Gonna Break"
8. "Visions of Johanna"
9. "Highway 61 Revisited"
10. "Soon After Midnight"
11. "Thunder on the Mountain"
12. "Forgetful Heart"
13. "Ballad of a Thin Man"
14. "Like a Rolling Stone
15. "All Along the Watchtower"

Encore

16. "Blowin' In The Wind"

=== Song Count ===
#	Song	Count
1	Ballad of a Thin Man	86
2	Highway 61 Revisited	86
3	Like a Rolling Stone	86
4	Tangled Up in Blue	86
5	Thunder on the Mountain	86
6	All Along the Watchtower	85
7	Things Have Changed	83
8	Blowin' in the Wind	77
9	Leopard-Skin Pill-Box Hat	42
10	Simple Twist of Fate	37
11	High Water (For Charley Patton)	35
12	Summer Days	34
13	Desolation Row	29
14	Visions of Johanna	28
15	Tweedle Dee & Tweedle Dum	27
16	Rollin' And Tumblin'	25
17	The Levee's Gonna Break	25
18	A Hard Rain's a-Gonna Fall	24
19	Love Sick	21
20	Watching the River Flow	21
21	Spirit on the Water	20
22	Beyond Here Lies Nothin'	17
23	Forgetful Heart	17
24	Cry A While	16
25	Honest With Me	16
26	To Ramona	16
27	Tryin' to Get to Heaven	16
28	Don't Think Twice, It's All Right	14
29	Make You Feel My Love	14
30	Man in the Long Black Coat	14
31	Sugar Baby	13
32	The Lonesome Death of Hattie Carroll	13
33	Blind Willie McTell	12
34	It's All Over Now, Baby Blue	12
35	Girl from the North Country	11
36	I'll Be Your Baby Tonight	11
37	Ballad of Hollis Brown	10
38	Mississippi	10
39	You Ain't Goin' Nowhere	10
40	It Ain't Me Babe	9
41	Chimes of Freedom	8
42	Early Roman Kings	7
43	Every Grain of Sand	7
44	John Brown	7
45	Love Minus Zero/No Limit	7
46	Can't Wait	6
47	Jolene	6
48	This Dream Of You	6
49	Ain't Talkin'	5
50	Not Dark Yet	5
51	Joey	4
52	Shelter from the Storm	4
53	Rainy Day Women #12 & 35	3
54	Just Like Tom Thumb's Blues	2
55	Soon After Midnight	2
56	Absolutely Sweet Marie	1
57	Delia	1
58	Dignity	1
59	Million Miles	1
60	My Back Pages	1
61	Nettie Moore	1
62	Pay in Blood	1
63	Saving Grace	1
64	Scarlet Town	1
65	Shadows (Gordon Lightfoot cover)	1
66	She Belongs to Me	1
67	Shooting Star	1
68	Sweet Home Chicago (Instrumental)	1
69	This Wheel's On Fire	1
70	Under The Red Sky	1
71	When the Deal Goes Down	1

== Band ==
- Bob Dylan – Guitar, Harmonica, Organ, Piano, Vocals
- Tony Garnier – Electric bass, Upright bass
- Donnie Herron – Banjo, Electric mandolin, Lap steel, Pedal steel, Viola, Violin
- Stu Kimball – Guitar
- George Recile – Drums, percussion
- Charlie Sexton – Guitar
