= Summer Days (Bob Dylan song) =

2001 Bob Dylan song

Song by Bob Dylan

from the album Love and Theft
- Released: September 11, 2001
- Recorded: May 2001
- Studio: Clinton Recording, New York City
- Genre: Blues; rock; rockabilly
- Length: 4:52
- Label: Columbia
- Songwriter: Bob Dylan
- Producer: Jack Frost

Love and Theft track listing
- 12 tracks: 1. "Tweedle Dee & Tweedle Dum"; 2. "Mississippi"; 3. "Summer Days"; 4. "Bye and Bye"; 5. "Lonesome Day Blues"; 6. "Floater (Too Much to Ask)"; 7. "High Water (For Charley Patton)"; 8. "Moonlight"; 9. "Honest With Me"; 10. "Po' Boy"; 11. "Cry a While"; 12. "Sugar Baby"

"Summer Days" is an uptempo twelve-bar blues/rockabilly song written and performed by American singer-songwriter Bob Dylan that appears as the third song on his 2001 album Love and Theft. It was anthologized on the compilation album The Best of Bob Dylan in 2005. Like most of Dylan's 21st century output, he produced the song himself under the pseudonym Jack Frost.

== Composition and recording ==
In their book Bob Dylan All the Songs: The Story Behind Every Track, authors Philippe Margotin and Jean-Michel Guesdon describe the song as the "first time Dylan wrote ... in an authentic rockabilly style, reminiscent of guitarist Brian Setzer". They note that he seems to be making fun of himself in the lyrics, "especially when he sings, 'The girls all say, 'You're a worn-out star'" and that his "excellent vocal" on the studio recording is "tinged with humor and lightness - light years away from the dense atmosphere of Time Out of Mind". They also praise the guitar playing as being "absolutely stunning, particularly "Charlie Sexton's excellent solos" and cite Sexton's riff in the introduction as being "close to Big Joe Turner's "Roll 'em, Pete". The song is performed in the key of E-flat major.

== Critical reception ==
Like Guesdon and Margotin, critic Greil Marcus also contrasted "Summer Days" with Time Out of Mind, especially with regard to Dylan's vocal performance, in his "Real Life Rock Top 10" column: "Speaking of trying on new clothes—four years ago, Dylan’s celebrated Time Out of Mind mapped a country of abandoned roads and emptied cities, and nothing like what’s happening here could have happened there. 'Waaaal'—in this song, 'Well' is always 'Waaaal', 'Yes' is always 'Yaaaaaaassss', pure minstrel diction, as befits an album seemingly named for Eric Lott’s 1993 study Love and Theft: Blackface Minstrelsy and the American Working Class—'Waaaaal, I’m standing on a table, I’m proposing a toast to the King', the singer shouts from inside a roadhouse where a Western Swing band is running a jitterbug beat as if it’s twirling a rope".

Spectrum Culture included "Summer Days" on a list of "Bob Dylan's 20 Best Songs of the '00s". In an article accompanying the list, critic Kevin Korber writes that it's "both unfortunate and kind of inevitable that Dylan doesn’t get much credit for having a sense of humor. His work is so steeped in the mythos of him being the Greatest American Songwriter that it’s easy to forget that he’s a human being" and calls the song "one of the most genuinely fun...on an album that has more than its fair share". Korber also notes that the "lyrics have a cyclical nature, ending where they began as Dylan seems to imply that life will keep going beyond him (or this Court Jester version of him), and the band’s looping patterns echo that sentiment".

In his book Bob Dylan, Performing Artist: 1986-1990 and Beyond, Paul Williams wrote that he is "thoroughly delighted by all of "'Summer Days' even though I have a low tolerance for Dylan uptempo kitchen-sink jump-shuffle numbers like most live versions of 'Everything Is Broken' and 'Highway 61'. But 'Summer Days' seems to me to break the mold, musically and lyrically and attitudinally fresh in ways that never stop tickling me".

NJ Arts critic Jay Lustig identified it as his favorite track on Love and Theft and referred to it as a "raucous neo-rockabilly song...bursting with musical energy and memorable lyrics". Singer/songwriter Elliott Murphy cited it as one of Dylan's top 10 songs of the 21st century in an article for Poetic Justice Magazine.

== Cultural references ==
The lines "She says, ‘You can’t repeat the past’, I say, ‘You can’t?’ / ‘What do you mean, You can’t, of course, you can!” are a close paraphrase of a passage from F. Scott Fitzgerald's 1925 novel The Great Gatsby.

The phrase "sucking the blood out of the genius of generosity" comes from a speech that Abraham Lincoln gave to the Washington Temperance Society.

Two lines in the song ("What good are you anyway if you can't stand up to some old businessman?" and "Gonna break in the roof, set fire to the place as a parting gift") are based on passages from Junichi Saga's Confessions of a Yakuza.

== Live versions ==
According to his official website, Dylan played the song 885 times on the Never Ending Tour Between 2001 and 2018. This makes it the most frequently played live song from Love and Theft and Dylan's 13th most frequently played live song ever. The live debut occurred at the Spokane Arena in Spokane, Washington on October 5, 2001 and the last performance (to date) took place at Horncastle Arena in Christchurch, New Zealand on August 28, 2018.
