= Po' Boy (Bob Dylan song) =

2001 Bob Dylan song

Song by Bob Dylan

from the album Love and Theft
- Released: September 11, 2001
- Recorded: May 2001
- Studio: Clinton Recording, New York City
- Genre: Folk; jazz
- Length: 3:04
- Label: Columbia
- Songwriter: Bob Dylan
- Producer: Jack Frost

Love and Theft track listing
- 12 tracks: 1. "Tweedle Dee & Tweedle Dum"; 2. "Mississippi"; 3. "Summer Days"; 4. "Bye and Bye"; 5. "Lonesome Day Blues"; 6. "Floater (Too Much to Ask)"; 7. "High Water (For Charley Patton)"; 8. "Moonlight"; 9. "Honest With Me"; 10. "Po' Boy"; 11. "Cry a While"; 12. "Sugar Baby"

"Po' Boy" is an acoustic folk/jazz song written and performed by American singer-songwriter Bob Dylan that appears as the tenth song on his 2001 album Love and Theft. It was anthologized on the compilation album Dylan in 2007. Like most of Dylan's 21st century output, he produced the song himself under the pseudonym Jack Frost.

== Background and composition ==
"Po' Boy" was one of the earliest songs Dylan wrote for Love and Theft. Guitarist/multi-instrumentalist Larry Campbell recalls Dylan showing him the song's unusual chord changes shortly after Dylan and his band had recorded the Oscar-winning song "Things Have Changed" in 1999: “They were relatively sophisticated changes for a Bob Dylan song...That was the first inkling of what the material might be like – taking elements from the jazz era and adding a folk sensibility to it". Critic Tim Riley also noted the song's relationship to jazz, claiming it "almost sounds as if it could have been recorded around 1920. [Dylan] leaves you dangling at the end of each bridge, lets the band punctuate the trail of words he's squeezed into his lines, which gives it a reluctant soft-shoe charm".

Dylan scholar Tony Attwood describes the song as "a walk through the heritage of American culture" due to the preponderance of the phrase "po' boy" throughout the history of American popular song. He also notes the song's references to the Southern United States and the use of vaudeville-style jokes (including a knock-knock joke) in the lyrics as well as one decidedly non-American influence: Japanese author Junichi Saga's Confessions of a Yakuza, a non-fiction book from which Dylan appropriated phrases. In their book Bob Dylan All the Songs: The Story Behind Every Track, authors Philippe Margotin and Jean-Michel Guesdon also discuss the song's referentiality, noting how Dylan even throws two Shakespeare characters, Othello and Desdemona, into the mix.

== Critical reception ==
Margotin and Guesdon call the song a "beautiful ballad in a rather surprising style, like many others on Love and Theft". They praise the interpretation of the band as "excellent...including two exquisite and subtle guitar parts by [Charlie] Sexton and [Larry] Campbell, and also [Tony] Garnier's upright bass, which he plays with a bow at the end of the song".

Thomas Ward at AllMusic referred to it as "a masterpiece of the writer's lyrical phrasing", noting how one "plays the song over and over but still can't quite fathom how Dylan gets all those syllables in, with such deftness. Lines like the hilarious 'Knocking on the door, I say, "Who is it? Where you from?" / Man says, "Freddy", I say, "Freddy who?", He says, "Freddy or not here I come"' are just staggering in their virtuosity, while being hilariously funny".

Spectrum Culture included "Po' Boy" on a list of "Bob Dylan's 20 Best Songs of the '00s". In an article accompanying the list, critic Ian Maxton calls the song "jaunty, even as death and violence lurk" and claims that it sounds, "for the first time in a decade or more, like the sound of a man having fun – cracking jokes, playing tricky literary games and calling on the pre-rock tunes of his youth to set the atmosphere just right".

A 2015 USA Today article ranking "every Bob Dylan song" placed "Po' Boy" 51st (out of 359), noting that the song's line "'all I know is that I’m thrilled by your kiss', is the perfect 10-word message on any card to your significant other".

The Sydney Morning Herald included it on a list of the "Top five Bob Dylan Songs" in 2021. The Big Issue included it at #58 on a list of the "80 best Bob Dylan songs - that aren't greatest hits", noting that it exemplifies Dylan's love of "puns and Dad jokes".

== Cultural references ==
The line "Po' boy, in a hotel called the Palace of Gloom / Calls down to room service, says, 'Send up a room'" is a reference to a joke in William A. Seiter's Marx Brothers-starring comedy A Night at the Opera from 1935.

The lyrics in the bridge beginning with "My mother was the daughter of a wealthy farmer" are constructed largely from phrases appropriated from Junichi Saga's Confessions of a Yakuza while simultaneously alluding to the "farmer's daughter" genre of jokes (of which Dylan's 1964 song "Motorpsycho Nitemare" is an extended example).

== Live versions ==
According to his official website, Dylan played the song 41 times on the Never Ending Tour between 2001 and 2010. This makes it the most infrequently played live song from Love and Theft. The live debut occurred at Van Andel Arena in Grand Rapids, Michigan on November 6, 2001 and the last performance (to date) took place at Patinoire Meriadeck in Bordeaux, France on June 29, 2010.

== Covers ==
Ryan Adams performed a fragment of the song while doing a Dylan impersonation at a concert in 2001.
