= Lonesome Day Blues =

2001 song by Bob Dylan

Song by Bob Dylan

from the album Love and Theft
- Released: September 11, 2001
- Recorded: May 2001
- Studio: Clinton Recording, New York City
- Genre: Blues
- Length: 6:05
- Label: Columbia
- Songwriter: Bob Dylan
- Producer: Jack Frost

Love and Theft track listing
- 12 tracks: 1. "Tweedle Dee & Tweedle Dum"; 2. "Mississippi"; 3. "Summer Days"; 4. "Bye and Bye"; 5. "Lonesome Day Blues"; 6. "Floater (Too Much to Ask)"; 7. "High Water (For Charley Patton)"; 8. "Moonlight"; 9. "Honest With Me"; 10. "Po' Boy"; 11. "Cry a While"; 12. "Sugar Baby"

"Lonesome Day Blues" is a twelve-bar blues song written and performed by Bob Dylan that appears as the fifth song on his 2001 album Love and Theft. Like most of Dylan's 21st century output, he produced the song himself under the pseudonym Jack Frost.

== Composition and recording ==
The song commits to the structure of traditional 12-bar blues, a three-chord format in which the first line of each verse is repeated and then answered. Dylan scholar Tony Attwood claims that the song's "point" is introduced in the first verse ("Well, today has been a sad ol’ lonesome day / Yeah, today has been a sad ol’ lonesome day / I'm just sittin’ here thinking / With my mind a million miles away"): "That tells us where Bob is and what he is doing. He’s letting his mind wander, here, there and everywhere else. His thoughts drift and vary about all the things that have happened to him. He’s left his lover, his family has either died or left, his friend has come and gone, and he tries a bit of homespun philosophy".

According to engineer Chris Shaw, "Lonesome Day Blues" was the first song Dylan recorded for Love and Theft and "really set the mood for that whole record".

== Critical reception ==
Music journalist Hank Shteamer, writing in a Rolling Stone article where the song placed 20th on a list of "The 25 Best Bob Dylan songs of the 21st Century", called it "a loose and raucous 12-bar shuffle in the spirit of classics like 'Leopard-Skin Pill-Box Hat', where [Dylan] throws narrative out the window and simply riffs". Shteamer also noted that, although Dylan had been experimenting with blues forms for over 40 years when he recorded it, "he’d rarely sounded like he was having more fun with the genre than he did on “Lonesome Day Blues”.

In their book Bob Dylan All the Songs: The Story Behind Every Track, authors Philippe Margotin and Jean-Michel Guesdon also cite it as an exemplary blues from Dylan, claiming that it "demonstrates how easily [he] can sing the genre. His voice takes on the atmosphere of Muddy Waters' electric period. The support of his musicians is extraordinary and shows remarkable unity".

Ian O'Riordan, in a 2021 article in the Irish Times ranking all of Dylan's albums (where Love and Theft placed sixth), praised David Kemper's drumming and cited "Lonesome Day Blues" as his favorite track.

== Cultural references ==
The songs's penultimate verse ("I'm gonna spare the defeated...I'm going to speak to the crowd / I am goin’ to teach peace to the conquered, I'm gonna tame the proud") refers to lines in Book VI of Virgil’s Aeneid. Allen Mandelbaum’s 1971 translation renders the Latin as follows: "“But yours will be the rulership of nations, Remember Roman, these will be your arts: To teach the ways of peace to those you conquer, To spare defeated peoples, tame the proud”. This is significant as it marked the first of many times Dylan would quote authors from classical antiquity in his 21st century output.

The lines "Samantha Brown lived in my house for about four or five months / Don't know how it looked to other people but I never slept with her even once" are paraphrased from Junichi Saga's Confessions of a Yakuza. Michael Karwowski argues in his book Bob Dylan: What the Songs Mean that "Samantha Brown" is a reference to the popular host of a number of television programs on the Travel Channel beginning in 1999.

== Live versions ==
Between 2001 and 2017, Dylan played the song 160 times on the Never Ending Tour. A live version from 2002 is included on The Bootleg Series Vol. 8 – Tell Tale Signs (2008). The live debut occurred at La Crosse Center Arena in La Crosse, Wisconsin on October 24, 2001, and the last performance (to date) took place at the Firefly Music Festival in Dover, Delaware on June 17, 2017.

== Cover versions ==
The Waterboys' Mike Scott, who has covered the song in live performance, cited it as his favorite Dylan composition in a 2021 article in The Guardian. He specifically credits the song's "punk" quality for inspiring his own "one-note guitar solo" when playing it at a Greenwich Village show celebrating Dylan's 75th birthday.
