= John Bester =

John Bester (1927-2010), born and educated in England, was one of the foremost translators of modern Japanese fiction. He was a graduate of the University of London's School of Oriental and African Studies.

== Works ==
- Classic Bonsai of Japan (New York: Kodansha International, 1989, ISBN 0-87011-933-8).

=== Translations ===
Among his translations are:

- Masterworks of Ukiyo-E: Utamaro by Muneshige Narazaki and Sadao Kikuchi (translation published in 1968).
- Black Rain by Masuji Ibuse (translation published in 1969).
- Sun and Steel by Yukio Mishima (autobiography, translation published in 1970).
- The Waiting Years by Fumiko Enchi (translation published in 1971).
- The Anatomy of Dependence by Takeo Doi (translation published in 1973).
- The Silent Cry by Kenzaburō Ōe (translation published in 1974).
- The Dark Room by Junnosuke Yoshiyuki (translation published in 1975).
- The Reluctant Admiral by Hiroyuki Agawa (biography of Isoroku Yamamoto, commander in chief of the Imperial Japanese Navy, translation published in 1979)
- Salamander and Other Stories by Masuji Ibuse (translation published in 1981).
- Acts of Worship: Seven Stories by Yukio Mishima (translation published in 1989).
- Once and Forever, the tales of Kenji Miyazawa by Kenji Miyazawa (includes Gauche the Cellist, translation published in 1993).
- Confessions of a Yakuza by Junichi Saga (reminiscenes of a yakuza boss, translation published in 1995.
- A Boy Called H by Kappa Senoh, translation published in 1999.

John Bester received the 1990 Noma Award for the Translation of Japanese Literature for Acts of Worship.
