= Mississippi (Bob Dylan song) =

2001 song by Bob Dylan

Song by Bob Dylan

from the album Love and Theft
- Released: September 11, 2001
- Recorded: May 2001
- Studio: Clinton Recording, New York City
- Genre: Country rock
- Length: 5:21
- Label: Columbia
- Songwriter: Bob Dylan
- Producer: Jack Frost

Love and Theft track listing
- 12 tracks: 1. "Tweedle Dee & Tweedle Dum"; 2. "Mississippi"; 3. "Summer Days"; 4. "Bye and Bye"; 5. "Lonesome Day Blues"; 6. "Floater (Too Much to Ask)"; 7. "High Water (For Charley Patton)"; 8. "Moonlight"; 9. "Honest With Me"; 10. "Po' Boy"; 11. "Cry a While"; 12. "Sugar Baby"

"Mississippi" is a medium-tempo country-rock song by the American singer-songwriter Bob Dylan that appears as the second track on his 2001 album Love and Theft. The song was originally recorded during the Time Out of Mind sessions (demo sessions in Fall 1996; official album sessions in January 1997), but was ultimately left off the album. Dylan rerecorded the song for Love and Theft in May 2001.

Described as having beauty and gravitas, the song features a pop chord progression and has a riff and lyrical theme similar to "Stuck Inside of Mobile with the Memphis Blues Again". It has been anthologized on every reissue of The Essential Bob Dylan since 2010 and frequently places on critics' lists of Dylan's greatest songs. Like much of Dylan's 21st century output, "Mississippi" was produced by Dylan under the pseudonym Jack Frost.

== Background and Recording ==
"Mississippi" was the last track recorded for Love and Theft, and according to drummer David Kemper, it was added almost as an afterthought. As Kemper explained in an interview with Uncut magazine: "We thought we were done with Love And Theft, and then a friend of Bob’s passed him a note, and he said, 'Oh, yeah, I forgot about this: "Mississippi"'. And then he made a comment, 'Did you guys ever bring the version we did down at the Lanois sessions?' And they said, 'Yeah, we have it right here'. And he said, "Let’s listen to it'. So they put it up on the big speakers, and I said, 'Damn – release it'! But it was just me and Tony [Garnier], and Larry [Campbell] wasn’t on it, and Charlie [Sexton] wasn’t on it. And so we all just said, 'Wait a minute. And Daniel is producer on it. Let’s re-record it'. So we did our version of it".

Dylan has, on multiple occasions, expressed dissatisfaction with the versions recorded for Time Out of Mind. Speaking to Rolling Stone about why he re-recorded it for Love and Theft, Dylan said, "The song was pretty much laid out intact melodically, lyrically and structurally, but Lanois didn't see it. Thought it was pedestrian. Took it down the Afro-polyrhythm route--multirhythm drumming, that sort of thing. Polyrhythm has its place, but it doesn't work for knifelike lyrics trying to convey majesty and heroism...On the performance you're hearing, the bass is playing a triplet beat, and that adds up to all the multirhythm you need, even in a slow-tempo song. I think Lanois is an excellent producer, though".

Dylan indicated in another interview that he felt he could re-record the song precisely because the earlier versions had not leaked and were not circulating among bootleg collectors: "I’ve been criticised for not putting my best songs on certain albums but it is because I consider that the song isn’t ready yet. It’s not been recorded right. With all of my records, there’s an abundance of material left off – stuff that, for a variety of reasons, doesn’t make the final cut...Except on this album, for which we re-cut the song ‘Mississippi'. We had that on the Time Out Of Mind album. It wasn’t recorded very well but thank God, it never got out, so we recorded it again. But something like that would never have happened ten years ago. You’d have probably all heard the lousy version of it and I’d have never re-recorded it. I’m glad for once to have had the opportunity to do so".

The recording is notable for Tony Garnier's bass part, one of the few instances of an ascending bass line in Dylan's entire catalog (along with "Like a Rolling Stone").

=== Personnel ===
In addition to Dylan, the song features Larry Campbell on mandolin and slide guitar, Charlie Sexton on guitar, Augie Meyers on organ, Tony Garnier on bass and David Kemper on drums.

== Reception ==
A 2015 USA Today article ranking "all of Bob Dylan's songs" placed "Mississippi" first (just ahead of "Visions of Johanna" and "Like a Rolling Stone"). An article accompanying the list noted that all of Dylan's greatest songs are about "that inexorable march to the end" but that Dylan was never "so wistful about the wasted years, lost love and loneliness as he is on 'Mississippi'".

Spectrum Culture included it in a list of "Bob Dylan's 20 Best Songs of the '00s". In an article accompanying the list, critic Peter Tabakis wrote that the song has been "pored over, picked apart, researched into and argued about since its official release on 'Love and Theft'. Some insist it's simply the lovesick tale of a wayward wanderer. Others suggest a more political reading, one that stretches back to the moral blight of American slavery and the fundamental contradictions of our Founding Documents". Tabakis also noted that "dilettantes and academics alike agree on one indisputable fact: 'Mississippi' ranks high as one of Dylan’s most complex, melodic and stunning compositions in a career brimming with them".

In their book Bob Dylan All the Songs: The Story Behind Every Track, authors Philippe Margotin and Jean-Michel Guesdon synopsize it as a pessimistic song told from the point of view of a narrator "who regrets coming to Mississippi and is a prisoner of his own past". They describe the Love and Theft arrangement as "more country rock" than the versions Dylan recorded for Time Out of Mind. They also praise Dylan's singing as confident and emotional and call the end result "one of the triumphs of Love and Theft".

In his book Bob Dylan, Performing Artist: 1986-1990 and Beyond, Mind Out of Time, Dylan scholar Paul Williams writes that "'Mississippi' is a beautiful, powerful song, something of an anchor for the album. I can easily believe that the lyrics and the melody are intended to convey majesty and heroism. Dylan's performance of the song gets these feelings across with a lot of charm and humor and empathy".

"Mississippi" ranked 19th in a Paste list of "The 42 Best Bob Dylan Songs". In an article accompanying the list, critic Cameron Wade wrote, "Perhaps the most well loved song from Dylan’s late-stage comeback, 'Mississippi' is Dylan doing what he does best. Buoyed along by a newly embraced country sound and one of the catchiest melodies he’s ever written, 'Mississippi' harkens back to classic Dylan and folk music subjects: long lost loves, traveling across the wide-open country, and the mythic figure of the drifter. Each line sounds like a folk saying or country proverb that Dylan must have picked up over the decades crisscrossing America".

In 2009, Rolling Stone named "Mississippi" the 17th best song of the decade, calling it "A drifter's love song that seems to sum up Dylan's entire career, and a rambling classic that ranks up there with 'Tangled Up in Blue'". Rolling Stone also listed the song at #260 on its list of 500 Greatest Songs of All Time, number 4 on its list of "The 25 Best Bob Dylan Songs of the 21st Century", and number 21 on its list of the "100 Greatest Bob Dylan Songs".

Ultimate Classic Rock critic Matthew Wilkening rated "Mississippi" as the best song Dylan recorded between 1992 and 2011. American Songwriter included it at #25 on its list of "the 30 Greatest Bob Dylan Songs". A 2021 Guardian article included it on a list of "80 Bob Dylan songs everyone should know". Singer/songwriter Elliott Murphy cited it as one of Dylan's top 10 songs of the 21st century in an article for Poetic Justice Magazine.

Stereogum ran an article to coincide with Dylan's 80th birthday on May 24, 2021 in which 80 musicians were asked to name their favorite Dylan song. Courtney Marie Andrews selected "Mississippi", noting how the song's "narrator is both wise and naive, but accepting of his older condition. He has reached the other side, but that doesn't mean he doesn’t have regrets. This type of writing brilliantly taps into the endless complexities of the human condition. As far as ballad writing goes, this song belongs up there with the timeless folk ballads such as 'Danny Boy' or "Red River Valley." His authorship need not even be named — the song speaks to time".

== Other versions ==
Three outtakes of the song from the Time Out of Mind sessions were eventually released on Dylan's 2008 "official" bootleg album Tell Tale Signs: Rare and Unreleased 1989–2006 (two versions on the generally released discs and one on a bonus disc included with the Deluxe Edition of the album). Two of these are full-band versions while one features just Dylan and producer Daniel Lanois on guitar.

The Bootleg Series Vol. 17: Fragments – Time Out of Mind Sessions (1996–1997), released on January 27, 2023, contains two additional previously unreleased studio outtakes of the song and a live version from 2001. On January 20, 2023, Dylan released one of these outtakes as a YouTube video to promote the album's release.

== Live performances ==
Between 2001 and 2012 Dylan played the song 76 times on the Never Ending Tour. A live version performed in Washington, D.C. on November 15, 2001 was released on The Bootleg Series Vol. 17: Fragments – Time Out of Mind Sessions (1996–1997). The live debut occurred at the Jackson County Fairgrounds in Central Point, Oregon on October 9, 2001 and the last performance (to date) took place at the Wells Fargo Center in Philadelphia, Pennsylvania on November 19, 2012.

== Notable cover versions ==
"Mississippi" has been covered by at least a dozen artists. Among the most notable versions:

Dylan offered the song to Sheryl Crow, who recorded it for her album The Globe Sessions, released in 1998, before Dylan revisited it for Love and Theft. Crow's version reworked the song's melody, phrasing, and arrangement, and has been described contrastingly as "remarkable" and as "forgettable, head-bopping pop".

Subsequently, the Dixie Chicks would make it a mainstay of their Top of the World, Vote for Change, and Accidents & Accusations Tours, in an approach that substantially followed Crow's. They officially released a live version from 2003 on their Top of the World Tour: Live album.

Singer-songwriter Ryan Adams covered the song three times in concert between 2001 and 2002.

Margaret Glaspy covered it live at a Dylan tribute show in 2022.

== Cultural references ==
The song's opening line, "Every step of the way, we walk the line" is an allusion to Johnny Cash's "I Walk the Line", a song Dylan cited as being "one of the most mysterious and revolutionary of all time" in his memoir Chronicles: Volume One.

The song's refrain, "Only one thing I did wrong / Stayed in Mississippi a day too long", is taken from a verse in the traditional folk song "Rosie". Dylan makes this connection explicit by namechecking "Rosie" elsewhere in the lyrics ("I was thinkin’ about the things that Rosie said / I was dreaming I was sleeping in Rosie’s bed").

The line "So give me your hand and say you’ll be mine" is a near-verbatim quote from Act 5, Scene 1 of William Shakespeare's Measure for Measure ("If he be like your brother, for his sake / Is he pardon’d; and, for your lovely sake, Give me your hand and say you will be mine").
