= Bye and Bye =

Song by Bob Dylan

from the album Love and Theft
- Released: September 11, 2001
- Recorded: May 2001
- Studio: Clinton Recording, New York City
- Genre: Swing
- Length: 3:16
- Label: Columbia
- Songwriter: Bob Dylan
- Producer: Jack Frost

Love and Theft track listing
- 12 tracks: 1. "Tweedle Dee & Tweedle Dum"; 2. "Mississippi"; 3. "Summer Days"; 4. "Bye and Bye"; 5. "Lonesome Day Blues"; 6. "Floater (Too Much to Ask)"; 7. "High Water (For Charley Patton)"; 8. "Moonlight"; 9. "Honest With Me"; 10. "Po' Boy"; 11. "Cry a While"; 12. "Sugar Baby"

"Bye and Bye" is a song written and performed by the American singer-songwriter Bob Dylan, released in 2001 as the fourth track on his album Love and Theft. As with most of Dylan's 21st-century output, he produced the song himself under the pseudonym Jack Frost.

== Composition and recording ==
Musically, "Bye and Bye" is what Oliver Trager calls an "easygoing, lilting ballad...something one would expect from Leon Redbone or, from an earlier era, Bing Crosby. Some Dylanologists have traced the musical source for 'Bye and Bye' to 'Having Myself a Time,' a song popularized by Billie Holiday and written by Leo Robin and Ralph Rainger".

Lyrically, however, "Bye and Bye" appears to have darker concerns. According to Trager again: "['Bye and Bye'] slowly gives way to the sentiments of a scary stalker. As Richard Harrington wrote in his September 16, 2001, The Washington Post review of Love and Theft:

In "Bye and Bye", Dylan sings "The future for me is already past / You were my first love, you will be my last". Take him literally and it's about obsessional desire for a particular woman. But it's also about American roots music and Dylan's abiding appreciation for it, and inspiration from it, over the course of half a century".

== Critical reception ==
In their book Bob Dylan All the Songs: The Story Behind Every Track, authors Philippe Margotin and Jean-Michel Guesdon discuss the song in relation to jazz and see it as prefiguring Dylan's mid-2010s exploration of the Great American Songbook: "After the rockabilly style of the previous track ['Summer Days'], Dylan revisits the jazz repertoire with 'Bye and Bye', which would have easily found its place on the track listing for Shadows in the Night, released in 2015. With the voice of a crooner, swing guitars, rhythm with brushes, walking bass, and organ, Dylan and his musicians create a superb piece. The songwriter has always admired Frank Sinatra, and he proves it here".

== Cultural references ==
The line "I'm gonna baptize you in fire so you can sin no more" is a paraphrase from the Gospel of Matthew, verse 3:11.

The line "I'm not even acquainted with my own desires" is a paraphrase from one of Rosalind's lines in Act 1, Scene III of William Shakespeare's As You Like It ("I do beseech your grace, Let me the knowledge of my fault bear with me: If with myself I hold intelligence Or have acquaintance with mine own desires, If that I do not dream or be not frantic,– As I do trust I am not–then, dear uncle, Never so much as in a thought unborn Did I offend your highness").

Historian Richard F. Thomas sees the line "I'll establish my rule through civil war" as a reference to the Roman civil wars that brought about the transition from republic to empire (with Dylan speaking in the first person as Julius Caesar). References to Ancient Rome would become increasingly prevalent on Dylan's subsequent albums of original material.

== Live performances ==
Dylan first performed the song live at the Wiltern Theatre in Los Angeles, California on October 17, 2002 and last performed it live exactly three years later on October 17, 2005 at the Globe Arena in Stockholm, Sweden. Having only played the song 78 times total, it is one of the least performed live songs from Love and Theft.
