= Acts of Worship =

1989 short story collection by Yukio Mishima

- Japanese version cover (1965) (The contents are different.)
- Author: Yukio Mishima
- Original title: Acts of Worship: Seven Stories
- Genre: Short story collection
- Publication date: 1989

Acts of Worship: Seven Stories is a collection of Yukio Mishima's short stories, translated by John Bester, published in 1989. Kimitake Hiraoka, or better known as Yukio Mishima was a one of Japan's most famous authors. In addition, he is also known as being one of the greatest writers of the 20th century due to both his fictional and non-fictional works. His work, Acts of Worship: Seven Stories took him most of Yukio Mishima's career to complete. Act of Worship: Seven Stories consists of seven stories titles "Fountains in the Rain" (雨のなかの噴水, Ame no nakano Funsui), "Raisin Bread" (葡萄パン, Budou pan), "Sword" (剣, Ken), "Sea and Sunset" (海と夕焼, Umi to Yuyake), "Cigarette" (煙草, Tabako), "Martydom" (殉教, Junkyo), and finally "Act of Worship" (三熊野詣, Mikumano Moude). The story titled "Sword" may be the most typical one out of the seven.

The title story is the tale of a professor's visit to three Kumano shrines, accompanied by his shy and submissive middle-aged housekeeper, and his reasons for doing so. The collection was translated into English by John Bester, whose work was praised for rendering "Mishima's complex Japanese into fluent and faithful English", and received the inaugural Noma Prize for Translation. The contents were selected by Bester from stories published by Mishima spanning from the 1940s to the mid 1960s.

This collection of short stories relates back to Mishima's personal life in different ways. Most of them are anecdotes from his own life that contains a lot of underlying meanings of life, love, power, violence, homosexuality, and religion.

== Included short stories ==
=== "Fountains in the Rain" (1963) ===
This story was a story about our expectations and perception of male-female relationships. On a rainy day, the teenage Akio meticulously breaks up with his girlfriend in a tea shop in the Marunouchi Building. In the story, Akio wanted to break up with his girlfriend because he wanted to "savoy her dismay" (Bester, 1989). His girlfriend breaks down into floods of tears, but only later does he heard that she was crying for no reason.

However, at the end his girlfriend's tears started to inspire a sort of female resistance which leads to Akio ending up feeling angry and humiliated.

=== "Raisin Bread" (1963) ===
An autobiographical story about a group of young, fashionable Japanese people with Western names in the '50s who attend a party near a beach. Raisin Bread follows Jack, Keeko, Gogi, and Peter that lives in a world full of jazz and music. There is no clear plot to this story, rather it just talks about a series of events. The group of people are written as people who live in the moment and want to live life "stupidly".

=== "Sword" (1963) ===
Kokubu Jiro is the captain of the university kendō team and the highly expected contestant of the East/West Japanese Kendō championship. He is admired by all of his teammates even the ones touched in their pride. The story also follows Kagawa who admires and envy Jiro, Mibu who worships and secretly fancies Jiro, and Kinouchi, their trainer.

The story is highly oriented on Jiro’s internal pessimist thoughts about the young generation, his own future and view of life (words that can be directly related to Mishima himself).

==== Main character ====
Jiro Kokubu
He is a character in the short story "Sword". He is a kendo champion as well as captain of the Kendō team. Jiro is described as having a lean body, tan skin, and a single-minded devotion to samurai. Not only is Jiro perceived as being almost near "perfect", but he is also described as being "icy" and "priggish". Furthermore, throughout the short story, Jiro has been shown to be "as hollow as the decadent society he inhabits" (Soloman, 1990).

=== "Sea and Sunset" (1955) ===
The story of an old French shepherd from the Cévennes who had participated in the Children's Crusade and Anri, a handyman The French man is described as having "clear blue eyes" and a "large nose". Now living in medieval Kamakura, he describes the visions of Christ he experienced to a deaf and dumb boy after climbing a hill behind the Zen temple of Kenchoji. This story's setting is on a beach with a beautiful sunset at Kamakura, a city in Japan.

The French man talked about his youth to Anri in French, while Anri talked about his visions of Christ. They talked about the children's crusade which resulted in hundreds of children being killed. The story continues by talking about Anri's horrific past of being sold as a slave in Egypt, Persia, and India. In India, Anri became a disciple of a Japanese Zen Master named Daigaku back to Japan. Anri talks about how he has felt hopeless and was filled with a sense of setback due to Christ not listening to any of his prayers.

Mishima himself explained that the theme of this story was his own boyhood experiences of waiting for the kamikaze wind during the Pacific War.

==== Main characters ====
Anri
A current handyman who was a slave sold around the world that ended up in Japan. Anri continues to ponder why the Mediterranean Sea did not split in two for create a road at that time as Christ had predicted.

=== "Cigarette" (1946) ===
The narrator reminisces about the time he first smoked cigarettes when he was a schoolboy. First published in 1946, this early story brought Mishima recognition in the Japanese literary world. The young Nagasaki liked Imura. Imura was described as macho in the story. Nagasaki goes ahead an attempts to smoke a cigarette in front of Imura to show Imura that they are the same type of person. However, Nagasaki instead choked on the Cigarette, ultimately humiliating themselves.

This short story talks about life, more specifically "boyhood". Mishima used this story to talk about the emptiness of reality. Furthermore, because this story is based on a memory from the past, the story can be seen as unreliable and more extreme compared to the reality of what may have happened.

=== "Martyrdom" (1948) ===
Hatakeyama is a highly respected schoolmate at his boarding school. He owns a book called Plutarch's Lives and proudly shows it to his friends. One day as he is about to show it to his mate Komiyama, he finds out that it has been stolen. Komiyama directly assumes it was stolen by Watari, a shy classmate everyone has been bullying.

At night Hatakeyama goes into Watari’s room and finds him reading the book. He beats the shit out of him and gets his book back but is weirdly turned on by the situation. The same night Watari tries to take his revenge by strangling Hatakeyama while he’s sleeping but he wakes up. Hatakeyama is angry and hits Watari for more than twenty minutes straight and both of them collapse out of exhaustion. Hatakeyama thinks about how he liked being strangled by Watari and wished he went further. Watari then tells him he’s very hurt because of the beating but then laugh about it. Hatakeyama understands that they’re on the same page and the two share a kiss.

Rumors about their relationship start to spread all around the school but it actually reinforces Hatakeyama’s leadership. Out of envy and boredom he tells his classmates to go after Watari. All of them go to the woods near the school and Hatakeyama and Watari fight. Watari bites Hatakeyama to the blood and drops some saliva which turns both of them on. The fight stops and Hatakeyama suggests that they should hurt Watari even more. They put a rope on a tree and hang Watari. The teenage boys suddenly become afraid of the crime they are committing and run off. Thirty minutes later the boys come back and find an empty rope hanging on the tree. It is unknown of what happened to Watari.

The story is about desire and power. Hatakeyama has homosexual desire (the reason he likes the book) and is conflicted about his relationship with Watari. He’s been bullying him but is turned on when Watari fights back, and responds to his sadomasochists fantasy by the same needs. They’re playing a game of physically hurting each other. This is why one may think Watari isn’t dead at the end and was actually pleased by what Hatakeyama was putting him through.

=== "Acts of Worship" (1965) ===
Acts of Worship talks about an elderly couple. Poet and professor of literature Fujimiya and his housekeeper Tsuneko visit three Kumano shrines, where Professor Fujimiya buries three combs, each inscribed with a syllable of a woman's name: Kayoko. Fujimiya explains that he was in love with a girl named Kayoko when he was young, but her parents had forced them to break up. After he left to go to university, Kayoko died of an illness, and Fujimiya vowed to remain single for the rest of his life. Before she died, Kayoko suggested they visit the three shrines of Kumano, and Fujimiya replied, half-joking, that he would take her when he was sixty. So now having reached that age, he brought the combs bearing her name to the Kumano mountains.

Tsuneko tries her best to do whatever Fujimiya wants her to do and proceeds to take on a role as Fujimiya's "silent accomplice". She starts to fully commit to playing into his fantasy and starts to create a new role as Fujimiya's partner.

==== Characters ====
Professor Fujimiya
Professor Fujimiya is a 60 years old professor who is a poet. Some of his students calls him "Dr. Weirdo". He is described as someone who is not good looking who has a "dark and insidious" personality. This character is modeled after Shinobu Orikuchi.

Tsuneko
A live-in housekeep to Mr. Fujimiya. She is a widow that had a marriage of two years. In the story, Tsuneko is described as someone who is not the best looking as well as lacking "feminine appeal". Furthermore, she is described as having an "undistinguished" personality as well as lacking any "special gifts".

== See also ==
- Japanese literature

== Sources ==
- Mishima, Yukio (1992) [1st pub. 1968]. 花ざかりの森・憂国 自選短編集 [The Forest in Full Bloom, Patriotism: Self-selected short stories]. Shincho Bunko (in Japanese) (Paperback ed.). Shinchosha. ISBN 978-4-10-105002-7.
- Matsumoto, Tōru; Satō, Hideaki; Inoue, Takashi, eds. (2000). 三島由紀夫事典 [Encyclopedia of Yukio Mishima] (in Japanese). Bensei Shuppan. ISBN 978-4-585-06018-5.
