= Moonlight (Bob Dylan song) =

2001 Bob Dylan song

Song by Bob Dylan

from the album Love and Theft
- Released: September 11, 2001
- Recorded: May 2001
- Studio: Clinton Recording, New York City
- Genre: Folk rock; western swing
- Length: 3:23
- Label: Columbia
- Songwriter: Bob Dylan
- Producer: Jack Frost

Love and Theft track listing
- 12 tracks: 1. "Tweedle Dee & Tweedle Dum"; 2. "Mississippi"; 3. "Summer Days"; 4. "Bye and Bye"; 5. "Lonesome Day Blues"; 6. "Floater (Too Much to Ask)"; 7. "High Water (For Charley Patton)"; 8. "Moonlight"; 9. "Honest With Me"; 10. "Po' Boy"; 11. "Cry a While"; 12. "Sugar Baby"

"Moonlight" is a song written and performed by the American singer-songwriter Bob Dylan, released in 2001 as the eighth track on his Love and Theft album. It is one of several songs on the album that nods to the pre-rock pop ballad genre. Like most of Dylan's 21st century output, he produced the song himself under the pseudonym Jack Frost.

== Composition and recording ==
The song's refrain, "Won't you meet me out in the moonlight alone?" was likely inspired by the Carter Family's 1928 recording of Joseph Augustine Wade's song "Meet Me By the Moonlight", although the rest of the lyrics and the melody are Dylan's own. According to Dylan scholar Tony Attwood, the song sees Dylan "playing with chords that he rarely if ever used before – chords of the type we might well find in the American popular songs of the 1920s and 1930s".

In an interview with Uncut magazine, engineer/mixer Chris Shaw recalled that the song was recorded entirely live in the studio: "It's really gorgeous, and I think the take that's on the record is the second take, the whole thing is completely live, vocals and all, not a single overdub, no editing, it all just flowed together at once, and it was a really beautiful moment".

== Reception ==
In a 2015 USA Today article that ranked "all of Bob Dylan's songs", "Moonlight" placed 28th (out of 359). It was the second highest rated song from Love and Theft on the list (behind only Mississippi, which placed first).

AllMusic's Stephen Thomas Erlewine calls it a "torch song" that's "equally captivating" to any of the album's more uptempo numbers and noted that, musically, Dylan "hasn't sounded this natural or vital since he was with The Band, and even then, those records were never as relaxed and easy" as this.

Spectrum Culture included the song on a list of Dylan's 20 best songs of the 21st century. In an article accompanying the list, critic Kevin Korber observed that those who seemed shocked when Dylan delved into the Great American Songbook beginning in 2015 with his Shadows in the Night album "may not have listened to 'Love and Theft' for quite some time, or else they would have remembered that 'Moonlight' made the inevitability of such an artistic left turn pretty obvious. Most of the album feels deliberately old-fashioned, as if Dylan is imbuing the musical genres and styles he grew up loving with new life, and this takes that idea to its extreme. It’s a jazzy torch song, the kind that would have been a hit for any number of big band crooners in the ‘40s. However, to call 'Moonlight' a straightforward tribute would be a mistake; after all, when has Bob Dylan ever been really straightforward?"

Singer Maria Muldaur, who has known Dylan since the 1960s, was inspired to record an entire album dedicated to Dylan's love songs after hearing "Moonlight" for the first time. "It had such jazzy, swinging melody progressions and very gorgeous lyrics," she said in an interview with the Arizona Daily Star. "It was very seductive and unbelievably romantic. It almost sounded like the kind of song you would expect Bing Crosby to be crooning to some broad on a balcony in the 1930s. Each line was like a different impressionistic painting that painted this idealistic, romantic landscape".

== Cultural references ==
The line "Doctor, lawyer, Indian chief..." is a reference to a 1945 song of that name by Hoagy Carmichael and Paul Francis Webster.

The line "For whom does the bell toll..." is a reference to Devotions upon Emergent Occasions by John Donne, which Dylan had previously referenced in his 1997 song "Standing in the Doorway".

== In popular culture ==
Actress/singer Rita Wilson references the song in her 2020 single "I Wanna Kiss Bob Dylan", which includes the lines: "Would his kisses be long like his six minute songs on Time Out of Mind / I want to kiss Bob Dylan / In a doorway standing in the moonlight".

== Live performances ==
Between 2001 and 2008 Dylan played the song 101 times on the Never Ending Tour. A live version performed in Chicago on March 7, 2004 was made available to stream on Dylan's official website in March 2004. The live debut occurred at Key Arena in Seattle, Washington on October 6, 2001 and the last performance (to date) took place at Brady Theater in Tulsa, Oklahoma on August 27, 2008.

== Notable cover ==
Maria Muldaur on her 2006 album Heart of Mine: Love Songs of Bob Dylan
