= Bob Dylan, Performing Artist =

2004 book series by Paul Williams

Bob Dylan, Performing Artist: The Early Years, 1960–1973
- Cover of the paperback edition
- Author: Paul Williams
- Subject: Music Of Bob Dylan
- Genre: non-fiction, Criticism
- Publisher: Omnibus Press
- Publication date: May 1, 2004 (2nd edition)
- Publication place: UK
- Media type: Print (hardback and paperback)
- Pages: 310 pp
- ISBN: 978-1-84449-095-0 (2nd edition, paperback)

Bob Dylan, Performing Artist: The Middle Years, 1974-1986
- Cover of the paperback edition
- Author: Paul Williams
- Subject: Music Of Bob Dylan
- Genre: non-fiction, Criticism
- Publisher: Omnibus Press
- Publication date: June 1, 2004 (2nd edition)
- Publication place: UK
- Media type: Print (hardback and paperback)
- Pages: 334 pp
- ISBN: 1-84449-096-3 (2nd edition, paperback)

Bob Dylan, Performing Artist: Mind Out Of Time,1986-1990 & beyond
- Cover of the paperback edition
- Author: Paul Williams
- Subject: Music Of Bob Dylan
- Genre: non-fiction, Criticism
- Publisher: Omnibus Press
- Publication date: August 8, 2005(2nd edition)
- Publication place: UK
- Media type: Print (hardback and paperback)
- Pages: 416 pp
- ISBN: 1-84449-831-X

Bob Dylan, Performing Artist is a series of three books written by music critic Paul Williams concerning the music of American singer-songwriter Bob Dylan. Unlike many other books about Dylan, these are not biographical but focus primarily on the performances delivered at various concerts over a period of almost forty years. The performances Williams analyzes were either personally attended or reviewed from audio-tapes (and sometimes from videotapes). In an interview published in Isis magazine's August 1990 issue, Williams told interviewer Derek Barker, "I didn't want to write about the person, I wanted to write about what this person has created, his art, his music." Bob Dylan, Performing Artist is considered one of the leading critical analyses of Dylan's songs and performances.

== The Early Years (1960–1973) ==
The first volume of the Performing Artist series, which covers the years 1960 through 1973, also recounts Dylan's childhood from his birth in May 1941 to August 1959. Early Years ends in December 1973 with Williams' review of the album Planet Waves.

== The Middle Years (1974–1986) ==
Middle Years is the second book of the series, covering from January 1974 to September 1986 and ending with a review of the album Knocked Out Loaded.

== Mind Out Of Time (1986–1990 and beyond) ==
The last of the three volumes spans from September 1986 through September 1990. As the word "beyond" in the title implies, Mind Out Of Time includes two reviews by Williams of albums recorded after 1990, Time Out of Mind (1997) and Love and Theft (2001). The reviews were previously published in the magazine Crawdaddy!. Williams does not provide an explanation for omitting reviews of other post-1990 albums such as Good as I Been to You and World Gone Wrong.

== Reception ==
All three volumes of Performing Artist were widely acclaimed by critics. Rolling Stone magazine described the series as "Substantial, compelling...a voyage of rediscovery." American poet Allen Ginsberg commented, "Paul Williams historicizes Dylan's genius of American tongue."
