= Sugar Baby (song) =

2001 Bob Dylan song

Song by Bob Dylan

from the album Love and Theft
- Released: September 11, 2001
- Recorded: May 2001
- Studio: Clinton Recording, New York City
- Genre: Rock
- Length: 6:40
- Label: Columbia
- Songwriter: Bob Dylan
- Producer: Jack Frost

Love and Theft track listing
- 12 tracks: 1. "Tweedle Dee & Tweedle Dum"; 2. "Mississippi"; 3. "Summer Days"; 4. "Bye and Bye"; 5. "Lonesome Day Blues"; 6. "Floater (Too Much to Ask)"; 7. "High Water (For Charley Patton)"; 8. "Moonlight"; 9. "Honest With Me"; 10. "Po' Boy"; 11. "Cry a While"; 12. "Sugar Baby"

"Sugar Baby" is a song written and performed by the American singer-songwriter Bob Dylan, released in 2001 as the 12th and final track on his album Love and Theft. Like most of Dylan's 21st century output, he produced the song himself under the pseudonym Jack Frost.

== Composition and recording ==
In their book Bob Dylan All the Songs: The Story Behind Every Track, authors Philippe Margotin and Jean-Michel Guesdon describe the song's lyrics as: "A narrator talks with mixed feelings about a woman who haunts him". They note that, musically, the song has an arrangement with "fewer instruments" than the other songs on Love and Theft and an "ethereal atmosphere" that is reminiscent of the work of producer Daniel Lanois.

Part of the chord progression and the lines, "Look up, look up, seek your maker, 'fore Gabriel blows his horn" are taken from the song "The Lonesome Road", co-written and performed by Gene Austin, and later covered by Frank Sinatra in a swing arrangement.

The song's opening line, "I've got my back to the sun 'cause the light is too intense" was originally written for, but ultimately discarded from, Dylan's 1997 song "Can't Wait". An early take of "Can't Wait" from the Time Out of Mind sessions featuring that lyric was released on The Bootleg Series Vol. 8: Tell Tale Signs: Rare and Unreleased 1989–2006 in 2008. The song is performed in the key of C major.

== Critical reception ==
Spectrum Culture included the song on a list of Dylan's 20 best songs of the 2000s In an article accompanying the list, critic Jacob Nierenberg noted that "Sugar Baby" is "indebted to folk and blues without wholly belonging to either" genre, resulting in a "song that feels like a new American standard, an object that’s at once familiar and novel. 'You went years without me', Dylan harrumphs on the chorus, 'Might as well keep going now'. He seems to be singing it as much for himself as for the object of his affections".

In the "Temperance" chapter of his book Dylan's Visions of Sin, literary scholar Christopher Ricks has a lengthy analysis of the song in which he emphasizes how the unusual pauses in Dylan's phrasing create meaning as much as the words do (e.g., "'have / broken many a heart' is itself a broken effect; 'a way of / tearing the world apart' does find itself torn apart in the utterance; and 'just as / sure as we're living' cannot but sound less sure than it claims").

The Big Issue placed it at #36 on a 2021 list of the "80 best Bob Dylan songs - that aren't the greatest hits" and called it "Not just a break-up song but a totally broken, never-picking-up-the-pieces-again one".

== Cultural references ==
The song shares its title with a Dock Boggs song, a recording Dylan is said to have treasured as a young folksinger in New York City.

The line "I'm staying with Aunt Sally but you know she's not really my aunt" refers to a passage in Mark Twain's novel Huckleberry Finn.

== In popular culture ==
In I'm Not There, Todd Haynes' unconventional biographical film about Dylan: As Heath Ledger's character, Robbie Clark, looks up to see three angels in the sky, Christian Bale's character, Jack Rollins, can be heard saying in voice-over, 'Sure as we're living, sure as we're born, look up, look up, Gabriel blows his horn'".

== Live performances ==
Between 2001 and 2012 Dylan played the song 130 times on the Never Ending Tour. The live debut occurred at Spokane Arena in Spokane, Washington on October 5, 2001.

== Cover versions ==
The song was covered by the English singer Barb Jungr on her 2002 album Every Grain of Sand: Barb Jungr Sings Bob Dylan.
