= Love and Theft (Bob Dylan album) =

2001 album by Bob Dylan

Studio album by Bob Dylan
- Released: September 11, 2001
- Recorded: May 8-21, 2001
- Studios: Clinton Recording, New York City
- Genres: Roots rock; Americana; blues; country; jazz
- Length: 57:25
- Label: Columbia
- Producer: Jack Frost (Bob Dylan's pseudonym)

Bob Dylan chronology
Live 1961–2000: Thirty-Nine Years of Great Concert Performances (2001)	"Love and Theft" (2001)	The Bootleg Series Vol. 5: Bob Dylan Live 1975, The Rolling Thunder Revue (2002)

Bob Dylan studio album chronology
Time Out of Mind (1997)	"Love and Theft" (2001)	Modern Times (2006)

"Love and Theft" is the thirty-first studio album by American singer-songwriter Bob Dylan, released on September 11, 2001, by Columbia Records. It featured backing by his touring band of the time, with keyboardist Augie Meyers added for the sessions. It peaked at No. 5 on the Billboard 200, and has been certified Gold by the RIAA. The album's highest chart positions worldwide were in Norway and Sweden, where it peaked at No. 1, giving Dylan his first No. 1 album in Norway since Infidels, and his first No. 1 album ever in Sweden. A limited edition release included a separate disc with two bonus tracks recorded in the early 1960s, and two years later, on September 16, 2003, this album was remixed into 5.1 surround sound and became one of 15 Dylan titles reissued and remastered for SACD playback.

== Background and recording ==
"Love and Theft" was the first album Dylan recorded with his Never Ending Tour road band. This is a trend that would continue with his subsequent eight studio albums. Guitarist/multi-instrumentalist Larry Campbell recalls Dylan showing him the chord changes for the new song "Po' Boy" shortly after the band had recorded Dylan's Oscar-winning original and non-album song "Things Have Changed" in 1999: "They were relatively sophisticated changes for a Bob Dylan song [...] That was the first inkling of what the material might be like—taking elements from the jazz era and adding a folk sensibility to it".

David Kemper, Dylan's drummer at the time, described in an interview how the sound of "Love and Theft" arose from lessons the band had absorbed from Dylan: "I didn't realise we were actually headed somewhere. I wasn't smart enough to realise: you are in the School of Bob. But when we went in to record "Love And Theft", I realised then, because the influences were really so old on that record. It comes from really early Americana, way back at the turn of the century, and the 1920s. And not everybody in the band was familiar with that style of playing. And I know that the songs that he would bring in would be these amazing examples of early Americana. Nobody that I know, knows as much about American music as Bob Dylan. He has spent so much time trying to understand, and collecting these songs—it was like a never stopping resource. He was always coming up with these songs or artists that I had never heard of. And then when we went in and recorded "Love And Theft" it was like, oh my God, he's been teaching us this music—not literally these songs, but these styles. And as a band, we're familiar with every one of these. That's why we could cut a song a day [...] and the album was done".

As Kemper indicated, the twelve songs on "Love and Theft" were recorded in just 12 days in May 2001 at Clinton Recording in Midtown Manhattan. The recording sessions were notable for their spontaneity. According to engineer Chris Shaw, "What surprised me was how quickly [Dylan] would abandon an arrangement when he was working. He'd say, 'What's the tempo? Let's do it in F and drop the tempo down and do it like a Western swing tune, and I want the drummer to play brushes, not drums.' And suddenly the song was completely different. Nothing was set in stone until he found that key, tempo and style that fit that vocal and that lyric".

For his part, Dylan had been interested in working with Chris Shaw when he heard Shaw had gotten his start on Public Enemy's early records. Dylan praised Shaw's work as an engineer during a press conference in Rome to promote "Love and Theft" in 2001: After complaining that previous producers had botched the recording of his vocals, he was asked if he felt it was difficult to record his voice in the studio. Dylan referenced Shaw when he responded, "I don't think so […] On this particular record we had a young guy who understood how to do it." Dylan would subsequently employ Shaw to engineer and mix his albums Modern Times and Rough and Rowdy Ways as well as various non-album tracks.

== Content ==
The album continued Dylan's artistic comeback following 1997's Time Out of Mind and was given an even more enthusiastic reception. The title of the album was apparently inspired by historian Eric Lott's book Love & Theft: Blackface Minstrelsy and the American Working Class, which was published in 1993. "Love and Theft becomes his Fables of the Reconstruction, to borrow an R.E.M. album title", writes Greg Kot in the Chicago Tribune (published September 11, 2001), "the myths, mysteries and folklore of the South as a backdrop for one of the finest roots rock albums ever made".

The opening track, "Tweedle Dee & Tweedle Dum", includes many references to parades in Mardi Gras in New Orleans, where participants are masked, and "determined to go all the way" of the parade route, in spite of being intoxicated. "It rolls in like a storm, drums galloping over the horizon into ear shot, guitar riffs slicing with terse dexterity while a tale about a pair of vagabonds unfolds," writes Kot. "It ends in death, and sets the stage for an album populated by rogues, con men, outcasts, gamblers, gunfighters and desperados, many of them with nothing to lose, some of them out of their minds, all of them quintessentially American.

They're the kind of twisted, instantly memorable characters one meets in John Ford's westerns, Jack Kerouac's road novels, but, most of all, in the blues and country songs of the 1920s, '30s and '40s. This is a tour of American music—jump blues, slow blues, rockabilly, Tin Pan Alley ballads, Country Swing—that evokes the sprawl, fatalism and subversive humor of Dylan's sacred text, Harry Everett Smith's Anthology of American Folk Music, the pre-rock voicings of Hank Williams [Sr.], Charley Patton and Johnnie Ray, among others, and the ultradry humor of Groucho Marx.

Offered the song by Dylan, Sheryl Crow later recorded an up-tempo cover of "Mississippi" for her The Globe Sessions, released in 1998, before Dylan revisited it for "Love and Theft". Subsequently, the Dixie Chicks made it a mainstay of their Top of the World, Vote for Change, and Accidents & Accusations Tours.

As music critic Tim Riley notes, "[Dylan's] singing [on 'Love and Theft' ] shifts artfully between humble and ironic...'I'm not quite as cool or forgiving as I sound,' he sings in 'Floater,' which is either hilarious or horrifying, and probably a little of both".

"'Love and Theft' is, as the title implies, a kind of homage," writes Kot, "[and] never more so than on 'High Water (for Charley Patton),' in which Dylan draws a sweeping portrait of the South's racial history, with the unsung blues singer as a symbol of the region's cultural richness and ingrained social cruelties. Rumbling drums and moaning backing vocals suggest that things are going from bad to worse. 'It's tough out there,' Dylan rasps. 'High water everywhere.' Death and dementia shadow the album, tempered by tenderness and wicked gallows humor".

"'Po' Boy', scored for guitar with lounge chord jazz patterns, 'almost sounds as if it could have been recorded around 1920", says Riley. "He leaves you dangling at the end of each bridge, lets the band punctuate the trail of words he's squeezed into his lines, which gives it a reluctant soft-shoe charm".

The album closes with "Sugar Baby", a lengthy, dirge-like ballad, noted for its evocative, apocalyptic imagery and sparse production drenched in echo. Praising it as "a finale to be proud of", Riley notes that "Sugar Baby" is "built on a disarmingly simple riff that turns foreboding".

In a Rolling Stone interview with Mikal Gilmore, Dylan himself summarized the album's themes as dealing with "business, politics and war, and maybe love interest on the side".

== Release and promotion ==
Bob Dylan in the poker-themed "Love and Theft" commercial

Although no singles were released from the album, Dylan appeared in a 30-second commercial featuring the song "Tweedle Dee & Tweedle Dum" that appeared online on August 28, 2001, and on network television beginning on September 3, 2001. The spot, directed by Kinka Usher, shows Dylan in a tense poker game with magician Ricky Jay, actress Francine York and Dharma & Greg writer Eddie Gorodetsky. The poker setting was Dylan's idea and, according to Usher, he only made one request of the director: "He said, `You know, I just don't want it to be corporate'. And I assured him that I wasn't going to do that, I was going to shoot it like a little film. I know he's very happy with it".

Dylan also consented to what, for him, was an unusual number of interviews with press to promote the album. On July 23, 2001, he participated in a press conference at the Hotel de la Ville in Rome with reporters from Austria, Britain, Denmark, Finland, Germany, the Netherlands, Italy, Norway, Sweden and Switzerland. He was also interviewed by Edna Gundersen for USA Today, Robert Hilburn for the Los Angeles Times and Mikal Gilmore for Rolling Stone. All of these interviews appeared shortly before or shortly after the album's release on September 11, 2001.

== Packaging ==
The album's cover features a black-and-white photograph of Dylan, sporting a then-new pencil-thin mustache, which was taken in the studio by Kevin Mazur. The back cover features a black-and-white portrait of Dylan taken by photographer David Gahr. Mazur also took the album's inside cover photo of Dylan and the "Love and Theft" band (including organist Augie Meyers). The album's art direction is credited to Geoff Gans.

== Reception and legacy ==
Professional ratings
Aggregate scores
Source	Rating
Metacritic	93/100
Review scores
Source	Rating
AllMusic	4.5/5 stars
Blender	5/5 stars
Chicago Sun-Times	3.5/4 stars
Entertainment Weekly	A−
The Guardian	3/5 stars
Los Angeles Times	4/4 stars
Q	4/5 stars
Rolling Stone	5/5 stars
Spin	9/10
The Village Voice	A+

The album won the Grammy Award for Best Contemporary Folk Album at the 44th Annual Grammy Awards. It was nominated for Album of the Year and the track "Honest with Me" was nominated for Best Male Rock Vocal Performance.

In a glowing review for his "Consumer Guide" column published by The Village Voice, Robert Christgau wrote: "If Time Out of Mind was his death album—it wasn't, but you know how people talk—this is his immortality album". Later, when The Village Voice conducted its annual Pazz & Jop critics' poll, "Love and Theft" topped the list, the third Dylan album to accomplish this. It also topped Rolling Stone's list. Q listed "Love and Theft" as one of the best 50 albums of 2001. Kludge ranked it at number eight on their list of best albums of 2001.

In 2003, the album was ranked number 467 on Rolling Stone's 500 Greatest Albums of All Time, climbing to number 385 in the 2012 update and dropping to number 411 in the 2020 update of the list. Newsweek magazine pronounced it the second best album of its decade. In 2009, Glide Magazine ranked it as the No. 1 Album of the Decade. Entertainment Weekly put it on its end-of-the-decade, "best-of" list, saying, "The predictably unpredictable rock poet greeted the new millennium with a folksy, bluesy instant classic".

In a 2020 list of "Bob Dylan's 10 greatest albums" in Far Out magazine, "Love and Theft" was ranked seventh. An article accompanying the list characterized the album as one in which "Dylan turns into a historian and showcases the music which moves him. It is another rootsy affair and one which feels capable of stirring up the ghosts of music past all on its own". A 2020 article at the Ultimate Classic Rock website also placed "Love and Theft" seventh in the Dylan pantheon, noting that it "plays like an attic-sweeping of songs and themes Dylan and others left behind over the years" and that it evokes "long-gone musical spirits from the other turn of the century". Finally, Glide Magazine likewise placed "Love and Theft" seventh in a comprehensive list ranking all of Dylan's albums, writing that "Dylan here pulls readers through a bevy of American song traditions" and that "each song recaptures and renews a sub-genre that influenced Dylan's career". Ian O'Riordan, in a 2021 article in the Irish Times, ranked the album sixth out of the 39, praising David Kemper's drumming and citing "Lonesome Day Blues" as his favourite track.

Johnny Cash, in a 2001 interview with The New York Times, named it as Dylan's best album.

Critic Jake Cole, in a 2021 Spectrum Culture article celebrating the album's 20th anniversary, referred to it as Dylan's most eclectic work "from the storming rock of 'Lonesome Day Blues' to the gorgeous slow-dance lounge number 'Moonlight', which points straight at Dylan's later Great American Songbook phase of the 2010s. In that sense, 'Love and Theft' might be the closest that Dylan ever came to capturing the spirit of his lauded Rolling Thunder Revue tour in the studio. If that roadshow was conceived as a way to rummage through folk tradition and feeding it into some kind of interpretive revivalism, this album codifies that approach into a freewheeling tour of blues, jazz, country and folk, all of it wrangled into a form of rock so rustic that even roots rock sounds modern compared to it".

=== Allegations of plagiarism ===
"Love and Theft" generated controversy when some similarities between the album's lyrics and Japanese writer Junichi Saga's book Confessions of a Yakuza were pointed out. Translated to English by John Bester, the book is a biography of one of the last traditional yakuza bosses in Japan. In the article published in the Journal, a line from "Floater" ("I'm not quite as cool or forgiving as I sound") was traced to a line in the book, which said "I'm not as cool or forgiving as I might have sounded." Another line from "Floater" is "My old man, he's like some feudal lord". One line in the book's first chapter is, "My old man would sit there like a feudal lord." However, when informed of this, author Saga's reaction was one of having been honored rather than abused from Dylan's use of lines from his work. Similarly, in defense of Dylan, Robert Christgau wrote: "All pop music is love and theft, and in 40 years of records whose sources have inspired volumes of scholastic exegesis, Dylan has never embraced that truth so warmly."

== Track listing ==
All tracks are written by Bob Dylan.

"Love and Theft" track listing
No.	Title	Recorded	Length
1.	"Tweedle Dee & Tweedle Dum"	May 8, 2001	4:46
2.	"Mississippi"	May 21, 2001	5:21
3.	"Summer Days"	May 8, 2001	4:52
4.	"Bye and Bye"	May 12, 2001	3:16
5.	"Lonesome Day Blues"	May 11, 2001	6:05
6.	"Floater (Too Much to Ask)"	May 12, 2001	5:00
7.	"High Water (For Charley Patton)"	May 17, 2001	4:04
8.	"Moonlight"	May 16, 2001	3:23
9.	"Honest with Me"	May 9, 2001	5:50
10.	"Po' Boy"	May 16, 2001	3:04
11.	"Cry a While"	May 18, 2001	5:04
12.	"Sugar Baby"	May 19, 2001	6:40
Total length:			57:25

Limited edition bonus disc digipak release
No.	Title	Length
1.	"I Was Young When I Left Home" (Recorded December 22, 1961)	5:24
2.	"The Times They Are a-Changin'" (Alternate version, recorded October 23, 1963)	2:56
Total length:		8:20 65:45

== Personnel ==
- Bob Dylan – vocals, guitar, piano, record production
- Larry Campbell – guitar, banjo, mandolin, violin
- Charlie Sexton – guitar
- Augie Meyers – accordion, Hammond B3 organ, Vox organ
- Tony Garnier – bass guitar and upright bass
- David Kemper – drums
- Clay Meyers – bongos
- Chris Shaw – engineering

== Charts ==
=== Weekly charts ===
Chart (2001)	Peak position
Australian Albums (ARIA)	6
Austrian Albums (Ö3 Austria)	2
Belgian Albums (Ultratop Flanders)	7
Belgian Albums (Ultratop Wallonia)	9
Canadian Albums (Billboard)	3
Danish Albums (Hitlisten)	1
Dutch Albums (Album Top 100)	16
Finnish Albums (Suomen virallinen lista)	16
French Albums (SNEP)	13
German Albums (Offizielle Top 100)	4
Irish Albums (IRMA)	3
Italian Albums (FIMI)	2
New Zealand Albums (RMNZ)	3
Norwegian Albums (VG-lista)	1
Scottish Albums (Official Charts)	2
Spanish Albums (PROMUSICAE)	21
Swedish Albums (Sverigetopplistan)	1
Swiss Albums (Schweizer Hitparade)	3
UK Albums (Official Charts)	3
US Billboard 200	5

=== Year-end charts ===
Year-end chart performance for "Love and Theft" by Bob Dylan
Chart (2001)	Position
Canadian Albums (Nielsen SoundScan)	148
Swedish Albums (Sverigetopplistan)	84
Swiss Albums (Schweizer Hitparade)	91
US Billboard 200	200

== Certifications ==
Region	Certification	Certified units/sales
New Zealand (RMNZ)	Gold	7,500^{^}
Sweden (GLF)	Gold	40,000^{^}
Switzerland (IFPI Switzerland)	Gold	20,000^{^}
United Kingdom (BPI)	Gold	100,000^{^}
United States (RIAA)	Gold	757,000
^{^} Shipments figures based on certification alone.
