= High Water (For Charley Patton) =

Song by Bob Dylan

from the album Love and Theft
- Released: September 11, 2001
- Recorded: May 2001
- Studio: Clinton Recording, New York City
- Genre: Country blues; folk rock
- Length: 4:04
- Label: Columbia
- Songwriter: Bob Dylan
- Producer: Jack Frost

Love and Theft track listing
- 12 tracks: 1. "Tweedle Dee & Tweedle Dum"; 2. "Mississippi"; 3. "Summer Days"; 4. "Bye and Bye"; 5. "Lonesome Day Blues"; 6. "Floater (Too Much to Ask)"; 7. "High Water (For Charley Patton)"; 8. "Moonlight"; 9. "Honest With Me"; 10. "Po' Boy"; 11. "Cry a While"; 12. "Sugar Baby"

"High Water (For Charley Patton)" is a song written and performed by the American singer-songwriter Bob Dylan, released as the seventh track on his 31st studio album "Love and Theft" in 2001 and anthologized on the compilation album Dylan in 2007. Like much of Dylan's 21st century output, he produced the track himself under the pseudonym Jack Frost.

The song draws its title from Charley Patton's "High Water Everywhere", and is meant as a tribute to that bluesman although Dylan scholar Tony Attwood notes that the song, both musically and lyrically, has little point of contact with the original Patton work.

== Composition and recording ==
Lyrically, "High Water (For Charley Patton)" is similar to Dylan's 1983 song "Blind Willie McTell" and his 2020 song "Goodbye Jimmy Reed" in that it pays tribute to the titular blues singer only indirectly. In spite of the title, and references to the Blues in the lyrics, the song is not itself a blues but rather a three-chord banjo-driven folk song. It is performed in the key of G major.

In their book Bob Dylan All the Songs: The Story Behind Every Track, authors Philippe Margotin and Jean-Michel Guesdon describe the song's creative arrangement: "The instrumental arrangements of this country-rock song highlight the two banjo parts provided by Larry Campbell and the rhythm section on accordion by Augie Meyers. Percussion added by David Kemper (timpani, shaker and tambourine overdubs) is also prominent. Finally, in each verse, there is an unidentified high-pitched voice far back in the mix". This was Dylan's first use of backing vocals since David Crosby sang on two songs on Under the Red Sky in 1990 and would be the last such use of backing vocals on any original Dylan song until "I've Made Up My Mind to Give Myself to You" and "Key West (Philosopher Pirate)" on Rough and Rowdy Ways in 2020.

According to engineer Chris Shaw, Love and Theft was recorded entirely using analog equipment (before Dylan switched to Pro Tools for Modern Times), which resulted in the original master tapes being chopped up when Dylan decided he wanted to re-arrange a song's verses during the mixing process. As Shaw explained in Uncut, "There was a lot of editing done on 'Love and Theft'. Like, the song 'High Water', for example, the verse order of that was changed quite a few times, literally hacking the tape up. He was like, 'Nah, maybe the third verse should come first. And maybe we should put *that* *there*'. There was a lot of that".

=== Personnel ===
In addition to Dylan, the song features Larry Campbell on banjo, Charlie Sexton on guitar, Augie Meyers on accordion, Tony Garnier on bass and David Kemper on drums and percussion. The backing vocalist(s) are unidentified but are likely Sexton and/or Campbell since they often harmonized with Dylan on vocals in live performance around this time.

== Critical reception ==
Andy Greene, writing in Rolling Stone, where the song placed second on a list of "The 25 Best Bob Dylan Songs of the 21st Century" (behind only "Things Have Changed"), notes that, for Dylan, Charley Patton's title was "really just a jumping-off point for a mythic ramble through 20th-century Americana that touches on Robert Johnson’s 'Dust My Broom', Big Joe Turner, the Ford Mustang, and the folk ballad 'The Cuckoo'. (As the title of the album suggests, these songs contain both things he loved and things he stole.)"

Spectrum Culture included the song on a list of "Bob Dylan's 20 best songs of the '00s". In an article accompanying the list, critic Tyler Dunston saw the line "Folks are leaving town" as a reference to the Great Migration of African-Americans displaced by the Great Mississippi Flood of 1927 and notes that "Dylan’s referentiality casts light on a web of interwoven threads of U.S. history which are impossible to disentangle—disaster, displacement, systemic racism and the history of popular music".

In a 2021 essay, Sean Latham discussed the song in relation to both Patton's work and the Mississippi flood: "[Patton] famously coaxed an extraordinary range of sounds from his voice and guitar to describe the devastation of a 1927 flood on the Mississippi that killed hundreds and displaced hundreds of thousands of black families, thus helping to propel a new wave of the Great Migration. In Dylan's version of the song, the waters crash through the entire sweep of human history, from the biblical flood to the Civil War, the Jim Crow South, and even modern philosophy. Charley Patton thus jostles with Charles Darwin, Big Joe Turner (the blues shouter who sang Shake, Rattle and Roll), and the English materialist philosopher George Lewes".

A 2021 Consequence article ranking Dylan's top 15 albums placed Love and Theft 10th and cited "High Water" as the highlight, claiming it is "notable that in approaching complex histories on this record, Dylan doesn’t simply paraphrase the story in his own words; rather, he lets the stories of others show through the cracks in his song, interweaving their voices with his".

Josh Hurst, writing for In Review 20 years after the release of Love and Theft, saw the song as emblematic of a pessimistic worldview that runs through the album as a whole: "It’s easy to trace a faint misanthropy through these songs, or at least a dim view of our species’ capacity for forward momentum and growth. 'High Water', a jaded reckoning with ecological, social, and/or financial collapse, shrugs at the notion of Darwinian evolution and lands on this inspiring line: 'As great as you are, man, you’ll never be greater than yourself'.

Philippe Margotin and Jean-Michel Guesdon write in their book that "Dylan's splendid vocals make 'High Water (For Charley Patton)' one of the best pieces on the album". The Big Issue placed it at #62 on a 2021 list of the "80 best Bob Dylan songs - that aren't the greatest hits" and implied that apocalyptic lines like "“It’s bad out there, high water everywhere” seemed to chime with the September 11 attacks.

== Cultural references ==
The song directly quotes three classic folk and blues songs in the last two verses:

- "The cuckoo is a pretty bird / She warbles as she flies" is taken from the traditional ballad "The Cuckoo".
- "I'm getting up in the morning / I believe I'll dust my broom" is a quote from Robert Johnson's "Dust My Broom".
- "Bertha Mason shook it – broke it, then she hung it on the wall" is Dylan's version of the refrain in Charley Patton's "Shake It and Break It", which he has amended to include a character from Charlotte Brontë's novel Jane Eyre.

== In popular culture ==
An instrumental portion of "High Water" is prominently featured in the Richard Gere-starring "Billy the Kid" segment of I'm Not There, Todd Haynes' unconventional biographical film about Dylan.

== Live performances ==
Since 2001 Dylan has performed the song 725 times on the Never Ending Tour. A live version of the song performed in Niagara Falls, Ontario on August 23, 2003 is included in The Bootleg Series Vol. 8 – Tell Tale Signs (2008). A live version of the song performed on February 1, 2002 in Sunrise, Florida was made available to stream on Dylan's official website in April 2002. Another live version of the song, performed in New York City on April 25, 2005, was also made available to stream on Dylan's official website in May 2005. The live debut occurred at the Staples Center in Los Angeles, California on October 19, 2001 and the last performance (to date) took place at the Wagner Noël Performing Arts Center in Midland, Texas on October 9, 2018.

== Notable cover ==
Joan Osborne covered it for her 2017 album Songs of Bob Dylan, a version that was released as a single in advance of the LP.
