= Confessions of a Yakuza =

1989 novel by Junichi Saga

- Author: Junichi Saga
- Original title: 浅草博徒一代; Asakusa bakuto ichidai
- Translator: John Bester
- Language: English
- Genre: Memoir
- Publisher: Kodansha
- Publication date: 1989
- Publication place: Japan
- Media type: Print
- Pages: 253 pp
- ISBN: 4-7700-1948-3
- OCLC: 32783016

Confessions of a Yakuza (浅草博徒一代, Asakusa bakuto ichidai) is a 1989 book by Japanese doctor and author Junichi Saga. It recounts a series of stories from the life of his patient Eiji Ijichi, a former Yakuza boss, as told in the last months of his life.

The book starts with the teenage Ijichi running away from his family home in Utsunomiya to Tokyo, to find a judge's mistress who he was having an affair with. The book follows Ijichi through his first job at a family coal merchant in the then district of Fukagawa, his various mistresses and treatment for syphilis, the 1923 Great Kantō earthquake, his initiation into the gang that controlled gambling in the Asakusa entertainment area, his various stretches in prison, his overseas service in occupied Korea in the 1920s, his rise to the boss of the gang, and his experiences during and after World War II.

The book paints a colorful picture of life in Japan in the first half of the 20th century, the structure and customs of a yakuza gang, gambling sessions, prison, and army life.

The English translation of the book by John Bester was initially published by Kodansha under the title The Gambler's Tale: A Life in Japan's Underworld.

== Principal characters ==
Eiji Ijichi: A dying Yakuza boss in his 70s who recounts various stories from his past to his doctor.

Junichi Saga: Ijichi's doctor, who spent many hours with Ijichi for months towards the end of his life, taping his reminiscences. Saga's main role in the book is to introduce some of the stories with descriptions of the older Ijichi as he recounts them.

== Influence on Bob Dylan ==
It was reported that some lines from Bob Dylan's 2001 album Love and Theft were "borrowed" from the book for songs. Some examples appeared in an article published in Journal, which indicated a line from "Floater" ("I'm not quite as cool or forgiving as I sound") was traced to a line in the book, which said "I'm not as cool or forgiving as I might have sounded." Another line from "Floater" is "My old man, he's like some feudal lord." The beginning of the book contains the line "My old man would sit there like a feudal lord."

When informed of the possibility that Dylan had lifted material from the book, Saga said he was honored that Dylan might have read and been inspired by Confessions of a Yakuza. He said "Please say hello to Bob Dylan for me because I am very flattered and very happy to hear this news."

Dylan has admitted to quoting the lines, but claims that such quotations are done to "enrich" folk and jazz music.
