= Junichi Saga =

Japanese physician and author (born 1941)

Junichi Saga (佐賀 純一, Saga Jun'ichi; born 1941) is a Japanese countryside physician and writer whose work records countryside experiences of numerous individuals (typically, his patients).

== Biography ==
Saga has written various books. Two, consisting of the recollections of the ordinary lives of people in the early twentieth century in the town of Tsuchiura in Ibaraki Prefecture, were translated into English as "Memories of Silk and Straw" and "Memories of Wind and Waves". He also wrote the 1989 Confessions of a Yakuza. The 1989 book was called "colorful, unorthodox" by the International Herald Tribune, "a witness to the past" by Le Monde, and "vivid and accurate" by the Los Angeles Times. Confessions of a Yakuza also briefly caused media coverage in 2003 when about a dozen passages were repurposed as lyrics by Bob Dylan for his album Love and Theft.

== Bibliography ==
- Memories of Silk and Straw, translated into English by Gerry O. Evans
- Memories of Wind and Waves, translated into English by Juliet Carpenter
- Confessions of a Yakuza
