= Never Ending Tour 2009 =

2009 concert tour by Bob Dylan

- Tour by Bob Dylan
- Poster to the concert in Berlin, Germany
- Start date: March 22, 2009
- End date: November 19, 2009
- Legs: 3
- No. of shows: 33 in Europe; 64 in North America; 97 in total

Bob Dylan concert chronology
- Never Ending Tour 2008 (2008); Never Ending Tour 2009 (2009); Never Ending Tour 2010 (2010)

The Never Ending Tour is the popular name for Bob Dylan's endless touring schedule since June 7, 1988.

== Information ==
The tour started in Stockholm, Sweden at an intimate concert at Berns Salonger. Dylan performed five concerts in England. One of which was at the Roundhouse in London which was a concert especially for the members of the BobDylan.com fan club. Dylan also performed at the Edinburgh Playhouse, the first time he had performed in the city since April 1995.

After completing the 33 date European tour Dylan returned to the United States to perform a summer ballpark tour. He was joined on the tour by Willie Nelson and John Mellencamp. The tour consisted of 31 dates. Dylan performed at Summerfest in Milwaukee and Rothbury Festival in Rothbury, Michigan.

After the summer tour Dylan and the band toured the States again in the fall starting in Seattle. During the fall tour Dylan and his band performed three concerts at several venues during the tour including the Hollywood Palladium, Aragon Ballroom, Wang Theatre and United Palace Theater where the tour ended on November 19.

== Opening acts ==
- Willie Nelson (July 1 – July 4, July 8 – August 16)
- The Wiyos (July 2 & July 4, July 8 – July 13, August 16)
- John Mellencamp (July 2 & July 4, July 8 – August 16)
- The Two Man Gentlemen Band (July 10 & 11)
- Johnny Rivers (October 13)
- John Doe (October 14)
- George Thorogood (October 15)
- Dion (November 17 – November 19)

== Band ==
- Bob Dylan – Vocals, harmonica, organ, guitar
- Denny Freeman – Guitar (Until 16 August 2009)
- Charlie Sexton – Guitar (From 4 October 2009)
- Stu Kimball – Rhythm guitar
- George Recelli – Drums, percussion
- Tony Garnier – Bass

== Tour dates ==
Date	City	Country	Venue	Tickets sold/available	Box office
Europe
March 22, 2009	Stockholm	Sweden	Berns Salonger	—N/a	—N/a
March 23, 2009	Stockholm	Sweden	Globe Arena	10,736 / 11,321 (95%)	$741,280
March 25, 2009	Oslo	Norway	Oslo Spektrum	7,684 / 7,782 (99%)	$702,767
March 27, 2009	Jönköping	Sweden	Kinnarps Arena	4,453 / 4,453 (100%)	$314,871
March 28, 2009	Malmö	Sweden	Malmö Arena	8,590 / 8,590 (100%)	$591,637
March 29, 2009	Copenhagen	Denmark	Forum Copenhagen	6,207 / 8,393 (74%)	$656,674
March 31, 2009	Hanover	Germany	AWD Hall	—N/a	—N/a
April 1, 2009	Berlin	Germany	Max-Schmeling-Halle	—N/a	—N/a
April 2, 2009	Erfurt	Germany	Messehalle	—N/a	—N/a
April 4, 2009	Munich	Germany	Zenith	—N/a	—N/a
April 5, 2009	Saarbrücken	Germany	Saarlandhalle	—N/a	—N/a
April 7, 2009	Paris	France	Palais des congrès de Paris	7,113 / 7,113 (100%)	$710,935
April 8, 2009	Paris	France	Palais des congrès de Paris	7,113 / 7,113 (100%)	$710,935
April 10, 2009	Amsterdam	Netherlands	Heineken Music Hall	14,928 / 16,500 (90%)	$1,156,562
April 11, 2009	Amsterdam	Netherlands	Heineken Music Hall	14,928 / 16,500 (90%)	$1,156,562
April 12, 2009	Amsterdam	Netherlands	Heineken Music Hall	14,928 / 16,500 (90%)	$1,156,562
April 14, 2009	Basel	Switzerland	St. Jakobshalle	—N/a	—N/a
April 15, 2009	Milan	Italy	Mediolanum Forum	—N/a	—N/a
April 17, 2009	Rome	Italy	PalaLottomatica	—N/a	—N/a
April 18, 2009	Florence	Italy	Nelson Mandela Forum	—N/a	—N/a
April 20, 2009	Geneva	Switzerland	SEG Geneva Arena	—N/a	—N/a
April 21, 2009	Strasbourg	France	Zénith de Strasbourg	4,553 / 5,365 (85%)	$331,049
April 22, 2009	Brussels	Belgium	Forest National	—N/a	—N/a
April 24, 2009	Sheffield	England	Sheffield Arena	—N/a	—N/a
April 25, 2009	London	England	The O_{2} Arena	17,873 / 17,905 (99%)	$1,031,037
April 26, 2009	London	England	The Roundhouse	—N/a	—N/a
April 28, 2009	Cardiff	Wales	International Arena	—N/a	—N/a
April 29, 2009	Birmingham	England	National Indoor Arena	—N/a	—N/a
May 1, 2009	Liverpool	England	Echo Arena Liverpool	—N/a	—N/a
May 2, 2009	Glasgow	Scotland	Scottish Exhibition and Conference Centre	—N/a	—N/a
May 3, 2009	Edinburgh	Scotland	Edinburgh Playhouse	—N/a	—N/a
May 5, 2009	Dublin	Ireland	The O_{2}	—N/a	—N/a
May 6, 2009	Dublin	Ireland	The O_{2}	—N/a	—N/a
North America (With Willie Nelson and John Mellencamp)
July 1, 2009^{[A]}	Milwaukee	United States	Marcus Amphitheater	— (Note: The July 1, 2009 concert in Milwaukee is a part of Summerfest.)	
July 2, 2009	Sauget	United States	GCS Ballpark	5,340 / 7,500 (71%)	$360,450
July 4, 2009	South Bend	United States	Coveleski Stadium	7,590 / 8,000 (95%)	$512,235
July 5, 2009^{[B]}	Rothbury	United States	Double JJ Resort	— (Note: The July 5, 2009 concert in Rothbury is a part of Rothbury Festival.)	
July 8, 2009	Louisville	United States	Louisville Slugger Field	6,225 / 7,500 (83%)	$420,188
July 10, 2009	Dayton	United States	Fifth Third Field	7,883 / 7,883 (100%)	$532,103
July 11, 2009	Eastlake	United States	Classic Park	7,010 / 8,000 (88%)	$473,175
July 13, 2009	Washington	United States	Consol Energy Park	5,600 / 7,000 (80%)	$378,000
July 14, 2009	Allentown	United States	Coca-Cola Park	10,000 / 10,000 (100%)	$675,000
July 15, 2009	New Britain	United States	New Britain Stadium	6,753 / 7,500 (90%)	$455,828
July 17, 2009	Essex Junction	United States	The Champlain Valley Expo	—N/a	—N/a
July 18, 2009	Bethel	United States	Bethel Woods Center for the Arts	14,084 / 17,357 (81%)	$707,560
July 19, 2009	Syracuse	United States	Alliance Bank Stadium	6,651 / 7,500 (100%)	$448,943
July 21, 2009	Pawtucket	United States	McCoy Stadium	7,642 / 10,000 (76%)	$515,835
July 23, 2009	Lakewood	United States	FirstEnergy Park	8,456 / 8,456 (100%)	$570,780
July 24, 2009	Aberdeen	United States	Ripken Stadium	6,994 / 8,000 (87%)	$472,095
July 25, 2009	Norfolk	United States	Harbor Park	4,836 / 7,500 (64%)	$326,430
July 27, 2009	Durham	United States	Durham Bulls Athletic Park	8,086 / 8,086 (100%)	$545,805
July 28, 2009	Simpsonville	United States	Heritage Park Amphitheater	—N/a	—N/a
July 30, 2009	Alpharetta	United States	Verizon Wireless Amphitheatre	—N/a	—N/a
July 31, 2009	Orange Beach	United States	The Amphitheater at the Wharf	—N/a	—N/a
August 2, 2009	The Woodlands	United States	Cynthia Woods Mitchell Pavilion	10,955 / 16,027 (68%)	$567,883
August 4, 2009	Round Rock	United States	Dell Diamond	8,825 / 8,825 (100%)	$595,688
August 5, 2009	Corpus Christi	United States	Whataburger Field	5,082 / 6,000 (85%)	$342,035
August 7, 2009	Grand Prairie	United States	QuikTrip Park	4,724 / 7,500 (63%)	$318,870
August 8, 2009	Lubbock	United States	Jones AT&T Stadium	—N/a	—N/a
August 9, 2009	Albuquerque	United States	Journal Pavilion	8,156 / 15,000 (54%)	$316,134
August 12, 2009	Lake Elsinore	United States	Lake Elsinore Diamond	5,500 / 7,000 (79%)	$371,250
August 14, 2009	Fresno	United States	Chukchansi Park	5,676 / 6,500 (87%)	$383,130
August 15, 2009	Stockton	United States	Banner Island Ballpark	7,536 / 7,536 (100%)	$508,608
August 16, 2009	Stateline	United States	Harveys Outdoor Arena	—N/a	—N/a
North America
October 4, 2009	Seattle	United States	Moore Theatre	—N/a	—N/a
October 5, 2009	Seattle	United States	WaMu Theater	—N/a	—N/a
October 7, 2009	Portland	United States	Memorial Coliseum	—N/a	—N/a
October 8, 2009	Eugene	United States	McArthur Court	—N/a	—N/a
October 10, 2009	Berkeley	United States	Greek Theatre	—N/a	—N/a
October 11, 2009	Berkeley	United States	Greek Theatre	—N/a	—N/a
October 13, 2009	Los Angeles	United States	Hollywood Palladium	9,705 / 11,548 (84%)	$506,153
October 14, 2009	Los Angeles	United States	Hollywood Palladium	9,705 / 11,548 (84%)	$506,153
October 15, 2009	Los Angeles	United States	Hollywood Palladium	9,705 / 11,548 (84%)	$506,153
October 17, 2009	Phoenix	United States	Arizona Veterans Memorial Coliseum	—N/a	—N/a
October 18, 2009	Paradise	United States	The Joint	—N/a	—N/a
October 19, 2009	Salt Lake City	United States	Saltair	—N/a	—N/a
October 21, 2009	Denver	United States	Magness Arena	—N/a	—N/a
October 23, 2009	Salina	United States	Bicentennial Center	—N/a	—N/a
October 24, 2009	Tulsa	United States	Brady Theater	—N/a	—N/a
October 25, 2009	Springfield	United States	Shrine Mosque	—N/a	—N/a
October 27, 2009	Rockford	United States	Rockford Metrocentre	—N/a	—N/a
October 29, 2009	Chicago	United States	Aragon Ballroom	9,451 / 10,500 (90%)	$473,529
October 30, 2009	Chicago	United States	Aragon Ballroom	9,451 / 10,500 (90%)	$473,529
October 31, 2009	Chicago	United States	Aragon Ballroom	9,451 / 10,500 (90%)	$473,529
November 2, 2009	Bloomington	United States	IU Auditorium	2,949 / 2,949 (100%)	$165,435
November 3, 2009	Columbus	United States	Lifestyle Communities Pavilion	1,892 / 2,000 (95%)	$89,870
November 5, 2009	Canton	United States	Canton Memorial Civic Center	3,956 / 4,693 (84%)	$189,887
November 6, 2009	Detroit	United States	Fox Theatre	—N/a	—N/a
November 7, 2009	Kitchener	Canada	Kitchener Memorial Auditorium	5,633 / 5,633 (100%)	$333,564
November 9, 2009	Philadelphia	United States	Liacouras Center	—N/a	—N/a
November 11, 2009	Fairfax	United States	Patriot Center	3,785 / 8,000 (47%)	$179,788
November 13, 2009	Boston	United States	Wang Theatre	7,629 / 10,344 (74%)	$532,433
November 14, 2009	Boston	United States	Wang Theatre	7,629 / 10,344 (74%)	$532,433
November 15, 2009	Boston	United States	Wang Theatre	7,629 / 10,344 (74%)	$532,433
November 17, 2009	New York City	United States	United Palace Theater	9,621 / 9,960 (97%)	$908,242
November 18, 2009	New York City	United States	United Palace Theater	9,621 / 9,960 (97%)	$908,242
November 19, 2009	New York City	United States	United Palace Theater	9,621 / 9,960 (97%)	$908,242
Total				306,362 / 357,719 (86%)	$20,413,738

=== Cancellations and rescheduled shows ===
July 29, 2009	Sevierville, Tennessee	Great Smoky Mountains National Park	Cancelled before official announcement.
August 11, 2009	Phoenix, Arizona	Camelback Ranch	Cancelled due to extreme weather conditions.
August 12, 2009	Las Vegas	Cashman Field	Rescheduled to August 16, 2009 and moved to Harveys Outdoor Arena in Stateline.

== Set lists ==
=== First leg (Europe) ===
This set list is representative of the performance on April 25, 2009 in London, England. It does not represent all concerts for the duration of the tour.

1. "Maggie's Farm"
2. "The Times They Are a-Changin'"
3. "Things Have Changed"
4. "Chimes of Freedom"
5. "Rollin' and Tumblin'"
6. "The Lonesome Death of Hattie Carroll"
7. "'Til I Fell in Love with You"
8. "Workingman's Blues #2"
9. "Highway 61 Revisited"
10. "Ballad of Hollis Brown"
11. "Po' Boy"
12. "Honest With Me"
13. "When the Deal Goes Down"
14. "Thunder on the Mountain"
15. "Like a Rolling Stone"

Encore

16. "All Along the Watchtower"
17. "Spirit on the Water"
18. "Blowin' in the Wind"

=== Second leg (North America) ===
This set list is representative of the performance on August 4, 2009 in Round Rock, Texas. It does not represent all concerts for the duration of the tour.

1. "Rainy Day Women ♯12 & 35"
2. "This Wheel's on Fire"
3. "The Levee's Gonna Break"
4. "Spirit on the Water"
5. "Honest With Me"
6. "Forgetful Heart"
7. "Tweedle Dee & Tweedle Dum"
8. "I Feel a Change Comin' On"
9. "Highway 61 Revisited"
10. "Ain't Talkin'"
11. "Thunder on the Mountain"

Encore

12. "Like a Rolling Stone"
13. "Jolene"
14. "All Along the Watchtower"

=== Third leg (North America) ===
This set list is representative of the performance on October 30, 2009 in Chicago, Illinois. It does not represent all concerts for the duration of the tour.

1. "Leopard-Skin Pill-Box Hat"
2. "The Man in Me"
3. "High Water (For Charley Patton)"
4. "Sugar Baby"
5. "Rollin' And Tumblin'"
6. "Every Grain of Sand"
7. "Cold Irons Bound
8. "Spirit on the Water"
9. "Honest With Me"
10. "Po' Boy"
11. "Highway 61 Revisited"
12. "Nettie Moore"
13. "Thunder on the Mountain"
14. "Ballad of a Thin Man"

Encore

15. "Like a Rolling Stone"
16. "Jolene"
17. "All Along the Watchtower"
