= The Essential Bob Dylan =

2000 greatest hits album by Bob Dylan

Greatest hits album by Bob Dylan
- Released: October 31, 2000
- Recorded: 1962–1999
- Genre: Folk; rock; country
- Length: 121:27 (standard edition); 147:33 (2009 standard edition); 154:52 (UK/Australia edition)
- Label: Columbia; Legacy

Bob Dylan chronology
The Best of Bob Dylan, Vol. 2 (2000)	The Essential Bob Dylan (2000)	Live 1961–2000: Thirty-Nine Years of Great Concert Performances (2001)

The Essential Bob Dylan is a compilation by Bob Dylan, released in 2000 as the inaugural entry in Sony Music's "The Essential" double-disc series. The Essential Bob Dylan spans from 1963's "Blowin' in the Wind" (from The Freewheelin' Bob Dylan) to 2000's "Things Have Changed" (Dylan's Oscar-winning song from the motion picture Wonder Boys).

The Essential Bob Dylan has proven to be a solid seller in Dylan's catalog, reaching No. 67 in the US and peaking at No. 9 in the UK.

The British and Australian releases include all of the tracks from the US edition plus several more. It has been reissued in 2009 and 2016 with varying track listings.

== Reception ==
The album reached No. 67 in the US charts and No. 9 in the UK.

It has been positively reviewed by AllMusic and favourably mentioned in Colin Larkin's The Encyclopedia of Popular Music.

== Track listings ==
=== Standard track listing ===
All tracks are written by Bob Dylan, except where noted.

Disc one
No.	Title	Origin	Length
1.	"Blowin' in the Wind"	The Freewheelin' Bob Dylan, 1963	2:45
2.	"Don't Think Twice, It's All Right"	The Freewheelin' Bob Dylan	3:37
3.	"The Times They Are a-Changin'"	The Times They Are a-Changin', 1964	3:11
4.	"It Ain't Me, Babe"	Another Side of Bob Dylan, 1964	3:32
5.	"Maggie's Farm"	Bringing It All Back Home, 1965	3:51
6.	"It's All Over Now, Baby Blue"	Bringing It All Back Home	4:16
7.	"Mr. Tambourine Man"	Bringing It All Back Home	5:26
8.	"Subterranean Homesick Blues"	Bringing It All Back Home	2:17
9.	"Like a Rolling Stone"	Highway 61 Revisited, 1965	6:07
10.	"Positively 4th Street"	single, 1965	3:52
11.	"Just Like a Woman"	Blonde on Blonde, 1966	4:50
12.	"Rainy Day Women ♯12 & 35"	Blonde on Blonde	4:34
13.	"All Along the Watchtower"	John Wesley Harding, 1967	2:30
14.	"Quinn the Eskimo (The Mighty Quinn)"	Recorded with The Band as part of the "Basement Tapes", 1967	2:17
15.	"I'll Be Your Baby Tonight"	John Wesley Harding	2:39
Total length:			56:09

Disc two
No.	Title	Origin	Length
1.	"Lay Lady Lay"	Nashville Skyline, 1969	3:16
2.	"If Not for You"	New Morning, 1970	2:39
3.	"I Shall Be Released"	Bob Dylan's Greatest Hits Vol. II, 1971	3:01
4.	"You Ain't Goin' Nowhere"	Bob Dylan's Greatest Hits Vol. II	2:43
5.	"Knockin' on Heaven's Door"	Pat Garrett & Billy the Kid, 1973	2:30
6.	"Forever Young"	Planet Waves, 1974	4:56
7.	"Tangled Up in Blue"	Blood on the Tracks, 1975	5:40
8.	"Shelter from the Storm"	Blood on the Tracks	5:01
9.	"Hurricane" (Dylan, Jacques Levy)	Desire, 1976	8:32
10.	"Gotta Serve Somebody"	Slow Train Coming, 1979	5:23
11.	"Jokerman"	Infidels, 1983	6:14
12.	"Silvio" (Dylan, Robert Hunter)	Down in the Groove, 1988	3:05
13.	"Everything Is Broken"	Oh Mercy, 1989	3:13
14.	"Not Dark Yet"	Time Out of Mind, 1997	6:27
15.	"Things Have Changed"	Wonder Boys (Music from the Motion Picture), 2000	5:08
Total length:			65:18

Disc three (limited edition 3.0 version)
No.	Title	Origin	Length
1.	"Thunder on the Mountain"	Modern Times, 2006	5:55
2.	"Mississippi"	"Love and Theft", 2001	5:21
3.	"Blind Willie McTell"	outtake from Infidels	5:52
4.	"Make You Feel My Love"	Time Out of Mind	3:32
5.	"Beyond Here Lies Nothin'" (Dylan, Hunter)	Together Through Life, 2009	3:51
6.	"Dark Eyes"	Empire Burlesque, 1985	5:07
Total length:			26:06

=== British and Australian track listing ===
Disc one
No.	Title	Origin	Length
1.	"Blowin' in the Wind"		2:45
2.	"Don't Think Twice, It's All Right"		3:37
3.	"The Times They Are a-Changin'"		3:11
4.	"It Ain't Me, Babe"		3:32
5.	"Maggie's Farm"		3:51
6.	"It's All Over Now, Baby Blue"		4:16
7.	"Mr. Tambourine Man"		5:26
8.	"Subterranean Homesick Blues"		2:17
9.	"Like a Rolling Stone"		6:07
10.	"Positively 4th Street"		3:52
11.	"Can You Please Crawl Out Your Window?"	single, 1965	3:32
12.	"I Want You"	Blonde on Blonde	3:07
13.	"Just Like a Woman"		4:50
14.	"Rainy Day Women#12 & 35"		4:34
15.	"All Along the Watchtower"		2:30
16.	"Quinn the Eskimo (The Mighty Quinn)"		2:17
17.	"I'll Be Your Baby Tonight"		2:39
18.	"Lay, Lady, Lay"		3:16
19.	"If Not for You"		2:39
20.	"I Shall Be Released"		3:01
21.	"You Ain't Goin' Nowhere"		2:43
22.	"Knockin' on Heaven's Door"		2:30
Total length:			76:57

Disc two
No.	Title	Origin	Length
1.	"Forever Young"		4:56
2.	"Tangled Up in Blue"		5:40
3.	"Shelter from the Storm"		5:01
4.	"Hurricane" (Dylan, Levy)		8:32
5.	"Changing of the Guards"	Street-Legal, 1978	7:04
6.	"Gotta Serve Somebody"		5:23
7.	"Blind Willie McTell"		5:52
8.	"Jokerman"		6:14
9.	"Tight Connection to My Heart (Has Anybody Seen My Love)"	Empire Burlesque	5:22
10.	"Silvio" (Dylan, Hunter)		3:05
11.	"Everything Is Broken"		3:13
12.	"Dignity"	Bob Dylan's Greatest Hits Vol. III, 1994	5:58
13.	"Not Dark Yet"		6:27
14.	"Things Have Changed"		5:08
Total length:			77:55

=== 2010 version ===
Disc one
No.	Title	Length
1.	"Blowin' in the Wind"	2:48
2.	"Don't Think Twice, It's All Right"	3:39
3.	"The Times They Are a-Changin'"	3:13
4.	"It Ain't Me, Babe"	3:34
5.	"Maggie's Farm"	3:53
6.	"It's All Over Now, Baby Blue"	4:16
7.	"Mr. Tambourine Man"	5:28
8.	"Subterranean Homesick Blues"	2:19
9.	"Like a Rolling Stone"	6:09
10.	"Positively 4th Street"	3:54
11.	"I Want You"	3:05
12.	"Just Like a Woman"	4:52
13.	"Rainy Day Women#12 & 35"	4:36
14.	"All Along the Watchtower"	2:32
15.	"Lay, Lady, Lay"	3:18
16.	"If Not for You"	2:41
17.	"You Ain't Goin' Nowhere"	2:45
18.	"I Shall Be Released"	3:04
19.	"Knockin' on Heaven's Door"	2:32
20.	"Tangled Up in Blue"	5:43
21.	"Forever Young"	4:58
Total length:		79:19

Disc two
No.	Title	Origin	Length
1.	"Shelter From the Storm"		5:02
2.	"Hurricane" (Dylan, Levy)		8:33
3.	"Gotta Serve Somebody"		5:25
4.	"The Groom's Still Waiting at the Altar"	B-side to "Heart of Mine", 1981	4:04
5.	"Jokerman"		6:15
6.	"Everything Is Broken"		3:13
7.	"Blind Willie McTell"		5:53
8.	"Not Dark Yet"		6:29
9.	"Make You Feel My Love"		3:32
10.	"Dignity" (alternate version)	outtake from Oh Mercy	5:36
11.	"Things Have Changed"		5:08
12.	"Mississippi"		5:21
13.	"Thunder on the Mountain"		5:53
14.	"When the Deal Goes Down"	Modern Times	5:01
15.	"Beyond Here Lies Nothin'" (Dylan, Hunter)		3:52
Total length:			79:17

=== 2014 version ===
Disc one
No.	Title	Length
1.	"Blowin' in the Wind"	2:49
2.	"Don't Think Twice, It's All Right"	3:41
3.	"The Times They Are a-Changin'"	3:14
4.	"It Ain't Me, Babe"	3:36
5.	"Maggie's Farm"	3:57
6.	"Mr. Tambourine Man"	5:28
7.	"Subterranean Homesick Blues"	2:20
8.	"Like a Rolling Stone"	6:11
9.	"Positively 4th Street"	4:09
10.	"Just Like a Woman"	4:52
11.	"Rainy Day Women#12 & 35"	4:36
12.	"All Along the Watchtower"	2:33
13.	"Quinn the Eskimo (The Mighty Quinn)"	2:19
14.	"I'll Be Your Baby Tonight"	2:41
15.	"Lay Lady Lay"	3:21
16.	"If Not for You"	2:40
Total length:		58:27

Disc two
No.	Title	Origin	Length
1.	"I Shall Be Released"		3:05
2.	"You Ain't Goin' Nowhere"		2:46
3.	"Knockin' on Heaven's Door"		2:31
4.	"Forever Young"		4:58
5.	"Tangled Up in Blue"		5:43
6.	"Hurricane" (Dylan, Levy)		8:34
7.	"Ring Them Bells"	Oh Mercy	3:02
8.	"Gotta Serve Somebody"		5:26
9.	"Jokerman"		6:17
10.	"Not Dark Yet"		6:29
11.	"Things Have Changed"		5:09
12.	"Make You Feel My Love"		3:33
13.	"Mississippi"		5:23
14.	"Beyond Here Lies Nothin'" (Dylan, Hunter)		3:51
15.	"Duquesne Whistle" (Dylan, Hunter)	Tempest, 2012	5:44
16.	"When the Deal Goes Down"		5:00
Total length:			77:31

=== 2016 vinyl version ===
Side one
No.	Title	Length
1.	"Blowin' in the Wind"	2:49
2.	"Don't Think Twice, It's All Right"	3:41
3.	"The Times They Are a-Changin'"	3:14
4.	"It Ain't Me, Babe"	3:36
5.	"Maggie's Farm"	3:57
6.	"Mr. Tambourine Man"	5:28
7.	"Subterranean Homesick Blues"	2:20
Total length:		25:05

Side two
No.	Title	Length
1.	"Like a Rolling Stone"	6:11
2.	"Positively 4th Street"	4:09
3.	"Just Like a Woman"	4:52
4.	"Rainy Day Women #12 & 35"	4:36
5.	"Lay Lady Lay"	3:21
6.	"Knockin' on Heaven's Door"	2:31
Total length:		25:40

Side three
No.	Title	Length
1.	"Forever Young"	4:58
2.	"Tangled Up in Blue"	5:43
3.	"Gotta Serve Somebody"	5:26
4.	"Jokerman"	6:17
5.	"Make You Feel My Love"	3:33
Total length:		25:57

Side four
No.	Title	Origin	Length
1.	"Things Have Changed"		5:09
2.	"Mississippi"		5:23
3.	"When the Deal Goes Down"		5:00
4.	"Beyond Here Lies Nothin'" (Dylan, Hunter)		3:51
5.	"Long and Wasted Years"	Tempest	3:46
Total length:			23:09

== Charts ==
Chart (2000)	Peak position
US Billboard 200	67

Chart (2001)	Peak position
Belgium (Flanders) 100 Albums	37
French Compilations	16
UK Albums Chart	9

Chart (2002)	Peak position
Australian Top 50 Albums	36

Chart (2004)	Peak position
Norwegian Top 40 Albums	5

Chart (2005)	Peak position
Netherlands Top 100 Albums	78
US Catalog Albums	23

Chart (2006)	Peak position
Finnish Top 50 Albums	30

Chart (2007)	Peak position
Swedish Top 60 Albums	57

Chart (2008)	Peak position
Spanish Top 100 Albums	90

Chart (2010)	Peak position
Greek Top 50 Albums	49

== Certifications ==
Region	Certification	Certified units/sales
Australia (ARIA)	3× Platinum	210,000^{^}
Italy (FIMI)	Gold	25,000^{‡}
Norway (IFPI Norway)	Gold	25,000^{*}
United Kingdom (BPI)	Platinum	300,000^{^}
United States (RIAA)	2× Platinum	2,000,000^{‡}
^{*} Sales figures based on certification alone.^{^} Shipments figures based on certification alone.^{‡} Sales+streaming figures based on certification alone.
