= The Best of Bob Dylan, Vol. 2 =

Greatest hits album by Bob Dylan
- Released: November 28, 2000
- Genres: Rock; folk; country
- Label: Columbia
- Producers: Bob Dylan; Don DeVito; Rob Fraboni; John H. Hammond; Bob Johnston; Daniel Lanois; Brendan O'Brien; Tom Wilson

Bob Dylan chronology
The Bootleg Series Vol. 4: Bob Dylan Live 1966, The "Royal Albert Hall" Concert (1998)	The Best of Bob Dylan, Vol. 2 (2000)	The Essential Bob Dylan (2000)

Professional ratings
Review scores
Source	Rating
The Encyclopedia of Popular Music	3/5 stars

The Best of Bob Dylan, Vol. 2 is a compilation album released in the UK, New Zealand, Australia and Canada on November 28, 2000. It is the sequel to The Best of Bob Dylan, Vol. 1, released three years earlier. It was later released in Europe and Japan.

== Track listing ==
All tracks are written by Bob Dylan, except where noted.

The Best of Bob Dylan, Vol. 2 track listing
No.	Title	Writer(s)	Original release	Length
1.	"Things Have Changed"		Wonder Boys (Music from the Motion Picture), 2000	5:10
2.	"A Hard Rain's A-Gonna Fall"		The Freewheelin' Bob Dylan, 1963	6:50
3.	"It Ain't Me Babe"		Another Side of Bob Dylan, 1964	3:33
4.	"Subterranean Homesick Blues"		Bringing It All Back Home, 1965	2:19
5.	"Positively 4th Street"		single, 1965	4:09
6.	"Highway 61 Revisited"		Highway 61 Revisited, 1965	3:27
7.	"Rainy Day Women #12 & 35"		Blonde on Blonde, 1966	4:35
8.	"I Want You"		Blonde on Blonde	3:06
9.	"I'll Be Your Baby Tonight"		John Wesley Harding, 1967	2:40
10.	"Quinn the Eskimo (The Mighty Quinn)"		Self Portrait, 1970	2:46
11.	"Simple Twist of Fate"		Blood on the Tracks, 1975	4:18
12.	"Hurricane"	Dylan, Jacques Levy	Desire, 1976	8:33
13.	"Changing of the Guards"		Street-Legal, 1978	7:04
14.	"License to Kill"		Infidels, 1983	3:33
15.	"Silvio"	Dylan, Robert Hunter	Down in the Groove, 1988	3:07
16.	"Dignity" (alternate version)		previously unreleased	5:37
17.	"Not Dark Yet"		Time Out of Mind, 1997	6:27
18.	"Forever Young" (demo)		Biograph, 1985	2:01
Total length:				79:15

Limited edition bonus disc
No.	Title	Length
1.	"Highlands (live version)"	11:19
2.	"Blowin' in the Wind (live version)"	7:08
Total length:		18:27 97:42

Both live songs were recorded on March 16, 2000, at the Santa Cruz Civic Auditorium, Santa Cruz, California.

== Chart performance ==
Chart (2000)	Peak position
German Albums (Offizielle Top 100)	75
New Zealand Albums (RMNZ)	40
Norwegian Albums (VG-lista)	8
Swiss Albums (Schweizer Hitparade)	94
