= Dylan (2007 album) =

Greatest hits album by Bob Dylan
- Released: October 2, 2007
- Recorded: 1962–2006
- Genres: Folk; rock; blues; country
- Length: 78:26; 228:20 (deluxe edition)
- Labels: Columbia; Legacy
- Producers: Barry Beckett; Gordon Carroll; Don DeVito; Bob Dylan; Rob Fraboni; John H. Hammond; Bob Johnston; Mark Knopfler; Daniel Lanois; Leon Russell; Jerry Wexler; Tom Wilson

Bob Dylan chronology
Modern Times (2006)	Dylan (2007)	The Bootleg Series Vol. 8: Tell Tale Signs: Rare and Unreleased 1989–2006 (2008)

Dylan is a greatest hits album by American singer-songwriter Bob Dylan. The collection was released on October 2, 2007 by Columbia Records and Legacy Recordings with worldwide distribution through Sony BMG. It was released as a single-disc CD and a three-disc Deluxe Edition (containing 51 songs), which was released as a digipack and a box set presented in replica-vinyl packaging, along with 10 postcards and an extensive booklet. The Deluxe Edition includes the 1971 version of "You Ain't Goin' Nowhere" although the album's liner notes erroneously state that it is the 1967 version.

== Track listings ==
=== Standard edition ===
All tracks are written by Bob Dylan, except where noted.

No.	Title	Length
1.	"Blowin' in the Wind" (from The Freewheelin' Bob Dylan, 1963)	2:48
2.	"The Times They Are a-Changin'" (from The Times They Are a-Changin', 1964)	3:15
3.	"Subterranean Homesick Blues" (from Bringing It All Back Home, 1965)	2:21
4.	"Mr. Tambourine Man" (from Bringing It All Back Home, 1965)	5:30
5.	"Like a Rolling Stone" (from Highway 61 Revisited, 1965)	6:09
6.	"Maggie's Farm" (from Bringing It All Back Home, 1965)	3:54
7.	"Positively 4th Street" (single, 1965)	3:54
8.	"Just Like a Woman" (from Blonde on Blonde, 1966)	4:51
9.	"Rainy Day Women 12 & 35" (from Blonde on Blonde, 1966)	4:36
10.	"All Along the Watchtower" (from John Wesley Harding, 1967)	2:33
11.	"Lay Lady Lay" (from Nashville Skyline, 1969)	3:19
12.	"Knockin' on Heaven's Door" (from Pat Garrett & Billy the Kid, 1973)	2:33
13.	"Tangled Up in Blue" (from Blood on the Tracks, 1975)	5:42
14.	"Hurricane" (Dylan, Jacques Levy) (from Desire, 1976)	8:34
15.	"Make You Feel My Love" (from Time Out of Mind, 1997)	3:33
16.	"Things Have Changed" (from Wonder Boys (Music from the Motion Picture), 2000)	5:09
17.	"Someday Baby" (from Modern Times, 2006)	4:56
18.	"Forever Young" (from Planet Waves, 1974)	4:55
Total length:		78:26

=== Deluxe edition ===
Disc one
No.	Title	Length
1.	"Song to Woody" (from Bob Dylan, 1962)	2:42
2.	"Blowin' in the Wind"	2:48
3.	"Masters of War" (from The Freewheelin' Bob Dylan)	4:33
4.	"Don't Think Twice, It's All Right" (from The Freewheelin' Bob Dylan)	3:39
5.	"A Hard Rain's a-Gonna Fall" (from The Freewheelin' Bob Dylan)	6:51
6.	"The Times They Are a-Changin'"	3:14
7.	"All I Really Want to Do" (from Another Side of Bob Dylan, 1964)	4:05
8.	"My Back Pages" (from Another Side of Bob Dylan)	4:23
9.	"It Ain't Me, Babe" (from Another Side of Bob Dylan)	3:34
10.	"Subterranean Homesick Blues"	2:19
11.	"Mr. Tambourine Man"	5:26
12.	"Maggie's Farm"	3:56
13.	"Like a Rolling Stone"	6:09
14.	"It's All Over Now, Baby Blue" (from Bringing It All Back Home)	4:14
15.	"Positively 4th Street"	3:54
16.	"Rainy Day Women#12 & 35"	4:35
17.	"Just Like a Woman"	4:52
18.	"Most Likely You Go Your Way (And I'll Go Mine)" (from Blonde on Blonde)	3:29
19.	"All Along the Watchtower"	2:31
Total length:		77:14

Disc two
No.	Title	Length
1.	"You Ain't Goin' Nowhere" (from Bob Dylan's Greatest Hits Vol. II, 1971)	2:44
2.	"Lay Lady Lay"	3:19
3.	"If Not for You"	2:41
4.	"I Shall Be Released" (from Bob Dylan's Greatest Hits Vol. II)	3:03
5.	"Knockin' on Heaven's Door"	2:31
6.	"On a Night Like This" (from Planet Waves)	2:58
7.	"Forever Young"	4:56
8.	"Tangled Up in Blue"	5:41
9.	"Simple Twist of Fate" (from Blood on the Tracks)	4:17
10.	"Hurricane" (Dylan, Levy)	8:34
11.	"Changing of the Guards" (from Street-Legal, 1978)	6:34
12.	"Gotta Serve Somebody" (from Slow Train Coming, 1979)	5:24
13.	"Precious Angel" (from Slow Train Coming)	6:33
14.	"The Groom's Still Waiting at the Altar" (B-side to "Heart of Mine", 1981)	4:05
15.	"Jokerman"	6:17
16.	"Dark Eyes" (from Empire Burlesque, 1985)	5:07
Total length:		74:44

Disc three
No.	Title	Length
1.	"Blind Willie McTell" (outtake from Infidels)	5:54
2.	"Brownsville Girl" (Dylan, Sam Shepard) (from Knocked Out Loaded, 1986)	11:05
3.	"Silvio" (Dylan, Robert Hunter) (from Down in the Groove, 1988)	3:07
4.	"Ring Them Bells" (from Oh Mercy, 1989)	3:01
5.	"Dignity" (alternate version) (outtake from Oh Mercy)	5:37
6.	"Everything Is Broken" (from Oh Mercy)	3:15
7.	"Under the Red Sky" (from Under the Red Sky, 1990)	4:10
8.	"You're Gonna Quit Me" (Traditional, arr. by Dylan) (from Good as I Been to You, 1992)	2:48
9.	"Blood in My Eyes" (Traditional, arr. by Dylan) (from World Gone Wrong, 1993)	5:04
10.	"Not Dark Yet" (from Time Out of Mind)	6:30
11.	"Things Have Changed"	5:09
12.	"Make You Feel My Love"	3:34
13.	"High Water (For Charley Patton)" (from "Love and Theft", 2001)	4:04
14.	"Po' Boy" (from "Love and Theft")	3:07
15.	"Someday Baby"	4:56
16.	"When the Deal Goes Down" (from Modern Times)	5:01
Total length:		76:22

== Charts and certifications ==
Chart (2007)	Peak position
Australian Top 50 Albums	25
Austrian Top 75 Albums	13
Belgium (Flanders) 100 Albums	26
Belgium (Wallonia) 100 Albums	16
Canadian Albums	36
Danish Top 40 Albums	22
Finnish Top 40 Albums	25
French Compilations	7
German Albums Chart	26
Irish Top 75 Albums	5
Italian Top 20 Albums	17
Japanese Albums Chart	54
Netherlands Top 100 Albums	19
New Zealand Top 40 Albums	8
Norwegian Top 40 Albums	16
Portuguese Top 30 Albums	30
Spanish Top 100 Albums	6
Swiss Top 100 Albums	16
UK Albums Chart	10
US Billboard 200: Standard edition	36
US Billboard 200: Deluxe edition	93
US Rock Albums	19

Chart (2008)	Peak position
Swedish Top 60 Albums	18

Region	Certification	Certified units/sales
Australia (ARIA)	Gold	35,000^{^}
Austria (IFPI Austria)	Gold	10,000^{*}
Ireland (IRMA)	Platinum	15,000^{^}
New Zealand (RMNZ)	Gold	7,500^{^}
Switzerland (IFPI Switzerland)	Gold	15,000^{^}
^{*} Sales figures based on certification alone.^{^} Shipments figures based on certification alone.
