= Never Ending Tour 2008 =

2008 concert tour by Bob Dylan

- Tour by Bob Dylan
- Poster to the concert in Minneapolis, USA
- Start date: February 2, 2008
- End date: November 21, 2008
- Legs: 5
- No. of shows: 59 in North America; 30 in Europe; 8 in South America; 97 in total

Bob Dylan concert chronology
- Never Ending Tour 2007 (2007); Never Ending Tour 2008 (2008); Never Ending Tour 2009 (2009)

The Never Ending Tour is the popular name for Bob Dylan's endless touring schedule since June 7, 1988.

== Information ==
The tour began with three shows at the House of Blues in Dallas before performing in Latin America and South America. Dylan performed three shows in Brazil, including one at the HSBC Arena and two shows at Via Funchal in São Paulo.

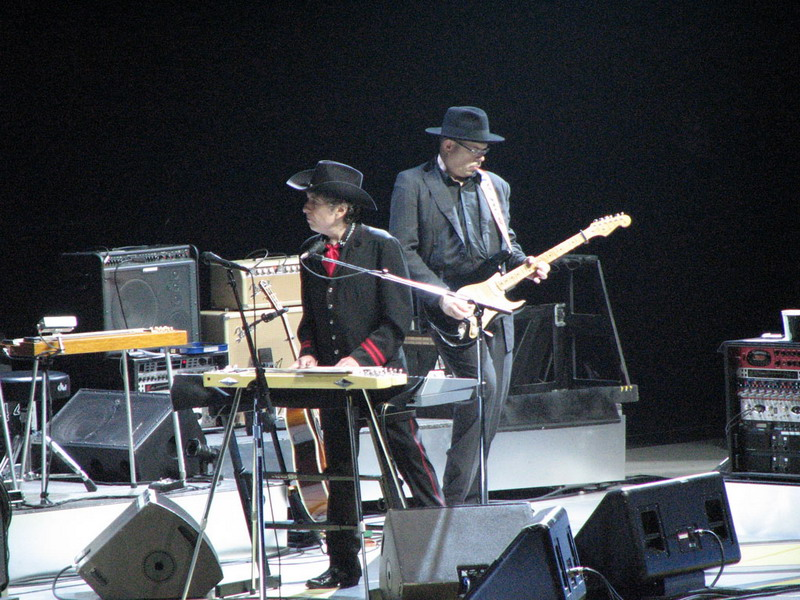
Bob Dylan in Toronto, Canada

After completing the South of the South Tour Dylan went on a brief tour to the United States and Canada. After touring North America Dylan and the band travelled to Europe to perform 30 shows including an appearance at Rock In Rio Lisbon and Optimus Alive!.

Dylan then returned to the United States to start a summer tour starting in Philadelphia on August 8 and coming to an end on September in Santa Barbara. Dylan and the band continued to tour North America throughout the fall of 2008 where the tour finally came to a close on November 21, 2008, at the United Palace Theater in New York City after 98 concerts.

== Tour dates ==
Date	City	Country	Venue	Attendance	Box Office
South of the South
February 21, 2008	Dallas	United States	House of Blues	—	—
February 22, 2008	Dallas	United States	House of Blues	—	—
February 23, 2008	Dallas	United States	House of Blues	—	—
February 26, 2008	Mexico City	Mexico	National Auditorium	17,452 / 19,366	$1,155,468
February 27, 2008	Mexico City	Mexico	National Auditorium	17,452 / 19,366	$1,155,468
February 29, 2008	Monterrey	Mexico	Arena Monterrey	—	—
March 2, 2008	Guadalajara	Mexico	Telmex Auditorium	—	—
March 5, 2008	São Paulo	Brazil	Via Funchal	4,937 / 5,000	$1,090,150
March 6, 2008	São Paulo	Brazil	Via Funchal	4,937 / 5,000	$1,090,150
March 8, 2008	Rio de Janeiro	Brazil	HSBC Arena	4,694 / 5,300	$429,366
March 11, 2008	Santiago	Chile	Arena Santiago	—	—
March 13, 2008	Córdoba	Argentina	Orfeo Superdomo	—	—
March 15, 2008	Buenos Aires	Argentina	José Amalfitani Stadium	—	—
March 18, 2008	Rosario	Argentina	Hipódromo Rosario	—	—
March 20, 2008	Punta del Este	Uruguay	Punta del Este Resort y Casino	—	—
March 25, 2008 (Note: The March 25, 2008 concert in Zacatecas was part of XXII Festival Cultural Zacatecas.)	Zacatecas	Mexico	Plaza De Armas En Zacatecas	—	—
North America
May 16, 2008	Worcester	United States	Worcester Palladium	—	—
May 17, 2008	Lewiston	United States	Androscoggin Bank Colisée	—	—
May 19, 2008	Saint John	Canada	Harbour Station	—	—
May 20, 2008	Moncton	Canada	Moncton Coliseum	—	—
May 21, 2008	Halifax	Canada	Halifax Metro Centre	8,525 / 8,525	$531,237
May 23, 2008	St. John's	Canada	Mile One Centre	6,952 / 10,378	$675,011
May 24, 2008	St. John's	Canada	Mile One Centre	6,952 / 10,378	$675,011
Europe
May 26, 2008	Reykjavík	Iceland	Laugardalshöll	—	—
May 28, 2008	Odense	Denmark	Arena Fyn	—	—
May 30, 2008	Stavanger	Norway	Viking Stadion	—	—
June 1, 2008	Helsinki	Finland	Hartwall Areena	—	—
June 3, 2008	Saint Petersburg	Russia	Ice Palace	—	—
June 4, 2008	Tallinn	Estonia	Saku Suurhall	—	—
June 5, 2008	Vilnius	Lithuania	Siemens Arena	—	—
June 7, 2008	Warsaw	Poland	Klub Stodoła	—	—
June 9, 2008	Ostrava	Czech Republic	ČEZ Aréna	—	—
June 10, 2008	Vienna	Austria	Wiener Stadthalle	—	—
June 11, 2008	Salzburg	Austria	Eisarena Salzburg	—	—
June 13, 2008 (Note: The June 13, 2008 concert in Varaždin was part of Radar Festival.)	Varaždin	Croatia	Stadion Varteks	—	—
June 15, 2008	Trento	Italy	Palazzo delle Albere	—	—
June 16, 2008 (Note: The June 16, 2008 concert in Lazaretto was part of Summer Sound Festival.)	Bergamo	Italy	Lazaretto	—	—
June 18, 2008	Aosta	Italy	Parco Castello Baron Gamba	—	—
June 19, 2008	Grenoble	France	Palais des Sports	—	—
June 20, 2008	Toulouse	France	Zénith de Toulouse	—	—
June 22, 2008	Encamp	Andorra	Campo de Fútbol Municipal d'Encamp	—	—
June 23, 2008 (Note: The June 23, 2008 concert in Zaragoza was part of Expo 2008.)	Zaragoza	Spain	Feria de Zaragoza	—	—
June 24, 2008	Pamplona	Spain	Pabellón Anaitasuna	—	—
June 27, 2008	Vigo	Spain	Recinto Ferial de Vigo	—	—
June 28, 2008 (Note: The June 28, 2008 concert in Hoyos del Espino was part of Músicos en la Naturaleza.)	Hoyos del Espino	Spain	Finca de Mesegosillo	—	—
July 1, 2008	Cuenca	Spain	Complejo Deportivo La Fuensanta	—	—
July 2, 2008	Alicante	Spain	Pabellón Pedro Ferrándiz	—	—
July 4, 2008	Lorca	Spain	Plaza de Toros de Lorca	—	—
July 5, 2008	Jaén	Spain	Recinto Ferial de Jaén	—	—
July 6, 2008 (Note: The July 6, 2008 concert in Madrid was part of Rock in Rio Madrid.)	Madrid	Spain	Ciudad del Rock	—	—
July 8, 2008	Jerez	Spain	Estadio Municipal de Chapín	—	—
July 10, 2008	Mérida	Spain	Plaza de Toros de Mérida	—	—
July 11, 2008 (Note: The July 11, 2008 concert in Oeiras was part of Optimus Alive!.)	Oeiras	Portugal	Passeio Marítimo de Algés	—	—
North America
August 8, 2008	Philadelphia	United States	Electric Factory	—	—
August 9, 2008 (Note: The August 9, 2008 concert in Pittsburgh was part of New American Music Union Festival.)	Pittsburgh	United States	SouthSide Works	—	—
August 10, 2008 (Note: The August 10, 2008 concert in Baltimore was part of Virgin Festival.)	Baltimore	United States	Pimlico Race Course	—	—
August 12, 2008	Brooklyn	United States	Prospect Park Bandshell	—	—
August 13, 2008	Asbury Park	United States	Asbury Park Convention Hall	—	—
August 15, 2008	Ledyard	United States	MGM Grand at Foxwoods	—	—
August 16, 2008	Atlantic City	United States	Borgata Events Center	—	—
August 17, 2008 (Note: The August 17, 2008 concert in Saratoga Springs was part of Saratoga Music Festival.)	Saratoga Springs	United States	Saratoga Performing Arts Center	10,072 / 25,228	$543,815
August 19, 2008	Hopewell	United States	CMAC Performing Arts Center	4,280 / 14,348	$181,547
August 20, 2008	Hamilton	Canada	Copps Coliseum	—	—
August 22, 2008	Cincinnati	United States	National City Pavilion	3,466 / 4,114	$212,042
August 23, 2008	Elizabeth	United States	Horseshoe Indiana Outdoor Stage	—	—
August 24, 2008	Evansville	United States	Mesker Amphitheatre	4,688 / 6,246	$183,575
August 26, 2008	Little Rock	United States	Riverfest Amphitheatre	—	—
August 27, 2008	Tulsa	United States	Brady Theater	—	—
August 28, 2008	Kansas City	United States	Uptown Theatre	—	—
August 30, 2008 (Note: The August 30, 2008 concert in Snowmass Village was part of Jazz Aspen Labor Day Festival.)	Snowmass Village	United States	Snowmass Town Park	—	—
August 31, 2008	Park City	United States	Snow Park Outdoor Amphitheater	—	—
September 1, 2008	Paradise	United States	The Joint	—	—
September 3, 2008	Santa Monica	United States	Santa Monica Civic Auditorium	3,460 / 3,460	$240,470
September 4, 2008	Temecula	United States	Pechanga Theatre	—	—
September 6, 2008 (Note: The September 6, 2008 concert in San Diego was part of Concerts on the Green at Qualcomm.)	San Diego	United States	Qualcomm Stadium	—	—
September 7, 2008	Santa Barbara	United States	Santa Barbara Bowl	—	—
October 23, 2008	Victoria	Canada	Save-On-Foods Memorial Centre	4,090 / 5,243	$230,557
October 24, 2008	Vancouver	Canada	General Motors Place	7,077 / 8,814	$355,045
October 25, 2008	Kamloops	Canada	Interior Savings Centre	4,620 / 4,620	$252,788
October 27, 2008	Calgary	Canada	Pengrowth Saddledome	6,721 / 8,943	$356,991
October 29, 2008	Edmonton	Canada	Rexall Place	8,322 / 9,800	$393,515
October 30, 2008	Lethbridge	Canada	ENMAX Centre	3,981 / 5,211	$195,372
November 1, 2008	Regina	Canada	Brandt Centre	—	—
November 2, 2008	Winnipeg	Canada	MTS Centre	—	—
November 4, 2008	Minneapolis	United States	Northrop Auditorium	4,751 / 4,751	$319,996
November 5, 2008	La Crosse	United States	La Crosse Center	3,251 / 5,130	$140,141
November 6, 2008	Milwaukee	United States	Riverside Theater	—	—
November 8, 2008	Kalamazoo	United States	Wings Stadium	—	—
November 9, 2008	Sault Ste. Marie	Canada	Essar Centre	—	—
November 11, 2008	London	Canada	John Labatt Centre	—	—
November 12, 2008	Oshawa	Canada	General Motors Centre	—	—
November 13, 2008	Sudbury	Canada	Sudbury Community Arena	—	—
November 15, 2008	Kingston	Canada	K-Rock Centre	—	—
November 16, 2008	Ottawa	Canada	Scotiabank Place	—	—
November 18, 2008	Montreal	Canada	Bell Centre	—	—
November 19, 2008	Oneonta	United States	Alumni Field House at SUNY Oneonta	—	—
November 21, 2008	New York City	United States	United Palace	—	—
