= Blues (Bob Dylan album) =

Compilation album by Bob Dylan
- Released: June 27, 2006
- Recorded: 1965–2001
- Genres: Blues; rock; folk
- Label: Columbia
- Producers: Barry Beckett; Bob Dylan; Bob Johnston; Mark Knopfler; Daniel Lanois; Jeff Rosen; Leon Russell; Jerry Wexler; Tom Wilson

Bob Dylan chronology
The Best of Bob Dylan (2005)	Blues (2006)	Modern Times (2006)

Professional ratings
Review scores
Source	Rating
AllMusic	3.5/5 stars

Blues is a single-disc compilation album by Bob Dylan, released on June 27, 2006, and distributed exclusively by Barnes & Noble. By November 2011 it also became available to members of the Jazz Heritage Society through their Review, Release # 564.

== Track listing ==
Blues track listing
No.	Title	Length
1.	"She Belongs to Me"	2:48
2.	"Leopard-Skin Pill-Box Hat"	3:58
3.	"It Takes a Lot to Laugh, It Takes a Train to Cry"	3:23
4.	"Down in the Flood"	2:49
5.	"Meet Me in the Morning"	4:22
6.	"Gotta Serve Somebody"	5:26
7.	"The Groom's Still Waiting at the Altar"	4:04
8.	"Seeing the Real You at Last"	4:22
9.	"Everything Is Broken"	3:14
10.	"Dirt Road Blues"	3:37
11.	"High Water (For Charley Patton)"	4:04
12.	"Blind Willie McTell"	5:51
Total length:		47:58
