= Someday Baby =

2006 song by Bob Dylan

Single by Bob Dylan

from the album Modern Times
- Released: August 29, 2006
- Recorded: February 2006
- Studio: Clinton Recording, New York City
- Genre: Folk rock; blues
- Length: 4:55 (album version); 3:07 (edit)
- Label: Columbia
- Songwriter: Bob Dylan
- Producer: Bob Dylan (as Jack Frost)

Bob Dylan singles chronology
"Things Have Changed" (2000)	"Someday Baby" (2006)	"Most Likely You Go Your Way (And I'll Go Mine)" (2007)

Modern Times track listing
- 10 tracks: 1. "Thunder on the Mountain"; 2. "Spirit on the Water"; 3. "Rollin' and Tumblin'"; 4. "When the Deal Goes Down"; 5. "Someday Baby"; 6. "Workingman's Blues #2"; 7. "Beyond the Horizon"; 8. "Nettie Moore"; 9. "The Levee's Gonna Break"; 10. "Ain't Talkin'"

Audio sample
- file; help

"Someday Baby" is a Grammy Award-winning blues song written and performed by American singer-songwriter Bob Dylan, released as the fifth track on his 2006 album Modern Times. The song garnered more airtime on U.S. radio than any other track on the album. It spent twenty weeks on Billboard's Adult Alternative Songs chart, peaking at No. 3 in November 2006. It was also anthologized on the compilation album Dylan in 2007.

Like much of Dylan's 21st century output, he produced the song himself under the pseudonym Jack Frost.

== Composition and recording ==
The song is based on "Trouble No More", a folk/blues song written by Muddy Waters and popularized by the Allman Brothers Band, which was in turn based on "Someday Baby Blues" by Sleepy John Estes and popularized by Big Maceo as "Worried Life Blues". In their book Bob Dylan All the Songs: The Story Behind Every Track, authors Philippe Margotin and Jean-Michel Guesdon note that although Dylan "may have kept the structure, he changed the lyrics. The story spins around the marital problems of a poor fellow, but is punctuated with lines of the purest Dylan style". The song is performed in the key of B-flat major.

== Use in commercial ==
Bob Dylan performing "Someday Baby" in a Modern Times/iPod commercial

The song was featured in a prominent iPod + iTunes commercial that appeared around the time Modern Times was released in early September 2006. In the commercial, shots of a silhouetted Dylan performing "Someday Baby" on acoustic guitar and singing into an antique microphone are juxtaposed with shots of the silhouette of a woman dancing. Writing in Wired magazine, Andy Cush summed up the ad by stating, "Taking advantage of Mr. Zimmerman's nearly pan-cultural appeal, Apple was able to attract cool dads and their college student kids with this single statement".

== Other versions ==
An alternate version of the song, from the same Modern Times recording sessions, featuring a slower tempo and different arrangement and lyrics, appeared on the 2008 Dylan compilation The Bootleg Series Vol. 8 – Tell Tale Signs: Rare and Unreleased 1989–2006. This version of the song was number 37 on Rolling Stone's list of the 100 Best Songs of 2008 and Dylan biographer Howard Sounes called it "more engaging" than the official album version. Engineer Chris Shaw, in an interview with Uncut, discussed the differences between the two versions:

On Love and Theft and Modern Times, Bob would sometimes come in with reference tracks, old songs, saying, "I want the track to be like this." So, like, on Modern Times, there's the Muddy Waters track ["Trouble No More"] that eventually became "Someday Baby". He'd come in and present these templates and use them as reference points. The songs were pretty much written before he came in, they weren't jammed out, but it was a case of him trying to get the band to play them the way he heard it. And sometimes that meant going down all these detours, "Okay, it's not really working like this, let's try it like this".

Like on the new Bootleg Series record, there's the slow version of "Someday Baby" on there, the kind of gospel one. That was just like, he was getting kind of frustrated with the "Muddy Waters" version not coming together, and, after dinner I think, he walked back into the room and George Receli, his drummer, was tapping out that groove, and Bob sat down at the piano, and all of a sudden they came up with *that* version. We really raced to record that, I think it was only done for one or two takes. I think the vocal is pretty much untouched, maybe just one or two lines he changed later. And I think the reason he abandoned *that* version was that he was still really stuck on the Muddy Waters version. And, also, because he may have thought it sounded a little too much like Time Out of Mind.

== Notable covers ==
The song was covered by Canadian singer/songwriter Leslie Feist live during her 2009 tour.

== Chart performance ==
Chart (2006)	Peak position
U.S. Billboard Adult Alternative Songs	3
U.S. Billboard Pop 100	98

== Awards ==
- Grammy Award for Best Solo Rock Vocal Performance (2007)
