= Never Ending Tour 2010 =

2010 concert tour by Bob Dylan

- Tour by Bob Dylan
- Poster to the concert in Monterey, USA
- Start date: March 11, 2010
- End date: November 27, 2010
- Legs: 4
- No. of shows: 15 in Asia; 25 in Europe; 62 in North America; 102 in total

Bob Dylan concert chronology
- Never Ending Tour 2009 (2009); Never Ending Tour 2010 (2010); Never Ending Tour 2011 (2011)

The Never Ending Tour is the popular name for Bob Dylan's endless touring schedule since June 7, 1988.

== Background ==
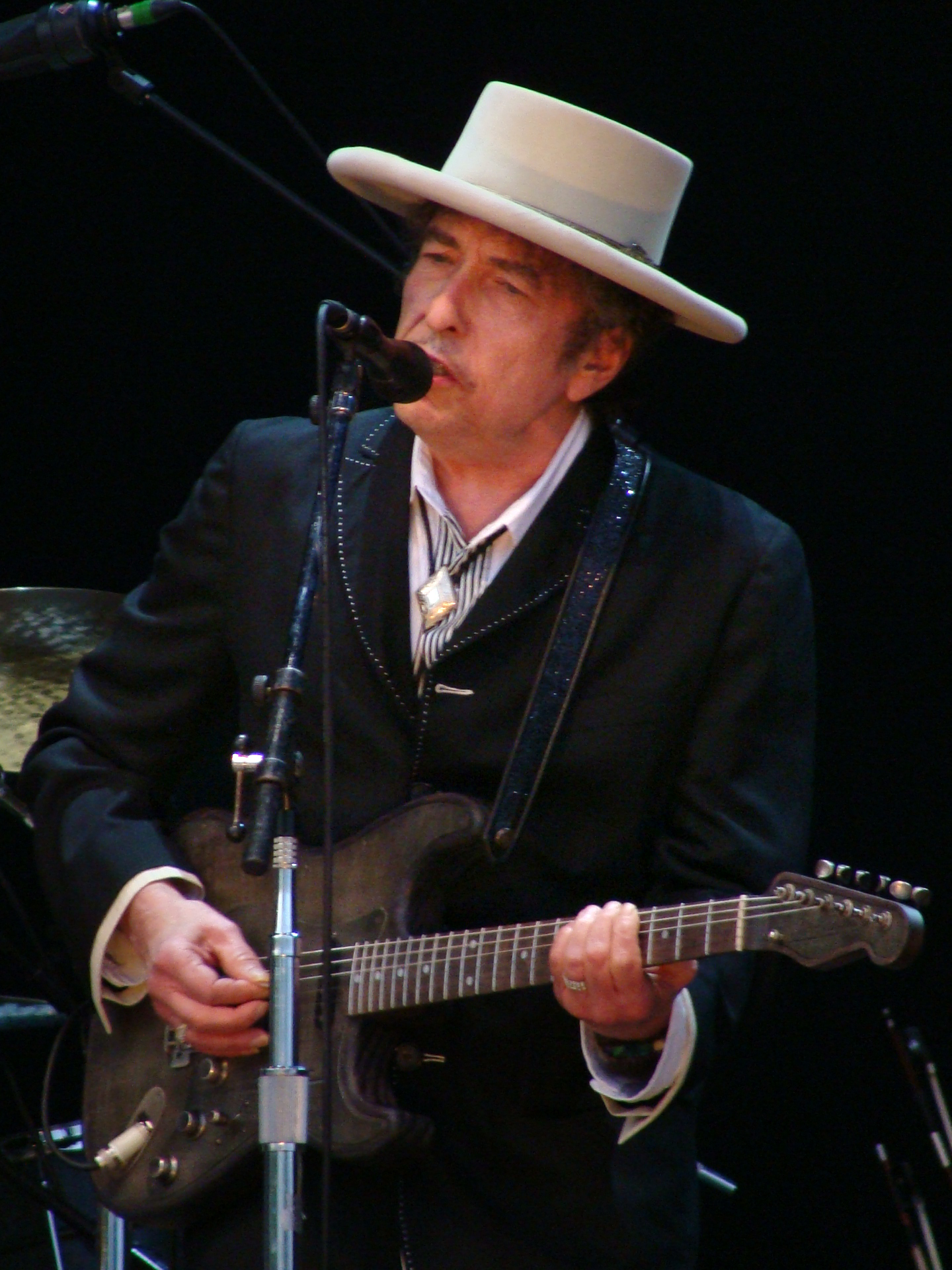
Bob Dylan performing in 2010

The tour started off with 14 shows in Japan including a 7 show run at Zepp Tokyo before moving on to a concert in South Korea, the first he had performed there.

After completing the Asian tour Dylan and the band performed a European Summer Tour comprising 27 dates including his only United Kingdom performance of the year at the Hop Farm Festival in Kent. The European tour finished the next day in Limerick, Ireland.

After touring Europe Dylan returned home to the United States for a month-long summer tour beginning on August 4 in Austin, Texas and ending on September 4 in Seattle, Washington and Bumbershoot. John Mellencamp was Dylan's co-headliner for approximately half of the shows.

The fall tour was mainly a tour of College venues and some smaller theaters such as the Murat Theater in Indianapolis. The tour came to a close in Mashantucket, Connecticut on November 27 after 102 shows.

== Opening acts ==
- Shooter Jennings (Oklahoma City, Oklahoma)
- The Dough Rollers (Kansas City, Missouri / Lincoln Nebraska / Billings Montana / Casper, Wyoming / Jackson, Wyoming / Oakland, California)
- John Mellencamp (Lincoln, Nebraska / Billings, Montana / Casper, Wyoming / Las Vegas, Nevada / Ontario, California / Bend, Oregon – Yakima, Washington)

== Tour dates ==
Date	City	Country	Venue	Opening Act(s)	Attendance	Box Office
Leg One — Asia
March 11, 2010	Osaka	Japan	Zepp Osaka	N/A	—	—
March 12, 2010	Osaka	Japan	Zepp Osaka	N/A	—	—
March 13, 2010	Osaka	Japan	Zepp Osaka	N/A	—	—
March 15, 2010	Osaka	Japan	Zepp Osaka	N/A	—	—
March 16, 2010	Osaka	Japan	Zepp Osaka	N/A	—	—
March 18, 2010	Nagoya	Japan	Zepp Nagoya	N/A	—	—
March 19, 2010	Nagoya	Japan	Zepp Nagoya	N/A	—	—
March 21, 2010	Tokyo	Japan	Zepp Tokyo	N/A	—	—
March 23, 2010	Tokyo	Japan	Zepp Tokyo	N/A	—	—
March 24, 2010	Tokyo	Japan	Zepp Tokyo	N/A	—	—
March 25, 2010	Tokyo	Japan	Zepp Tokyo	N/A	—	—
March 26, 2010	Tokyo	Japan	Zepp Tokyo	N/A	—	—
March 28, 2010	Tokyo	Japan	Zepp Tokyo	N/A	—	—
March 29, 2010	Tokyo	Japan	Zepp Tokyo	N/A	—	—
March 31, 2010	Seoul	South Korea	Olympic Gymnastics Arena	N/A	—	—
Leg Two — Europe
May 29, 2010	Athens	Greece	Terra Vibe Park	N/A	—	—
May 31, 2010	Istanbul	Turkey	Cemil Topuzlu Open-Air Theatre	N/A	—	—
June 2, 2010	Bucharest	Romania	Zone Arena	N/A	—	—
June 3, 2010	Sofia	Bulgaria	National Palace of Culture	N/A	—	—
June 4, 2010	Skopje	Macedonia	Metropolis Arena	N/A	—	—
June 6, 2010	Belgrade	Serbia	Belgrade Arena	N/A	—	—
June 7, 2010 (Note: The June 7, 2010 concert at Šalata in Zagreb, Croatia was part of the InMusic Festival.)	Zagreb	Croatia	Šalata	N/A	—	—
June 9, 2010	Bratislava	Slovakia	Incheba Expo	N/A	—	—
June 11, 2010	Prague	Czech Republic	O_{2} Arena	N/A	—	—
June 12, 2010	Linz	Austria	TipsArena Linz	N/A	—	—
June 13, 2010	Ljubljana	Slovenia	Hala Tivoli	N/A	—	—
June 15, 2010 (Note: The June 15, 2010 concert at PalaFabris in Padua, Italy was originally scheduled to take place at Piazzola sul Brenta due to weather concerns.)	Padua	Italy	PalaFabris	N/A	—	—
June 16, 2010	Viareggio	Italy	Cittadella del Carnevale	N/A	—	—
June 18, 2010	Parma	Italy	Parco Ducale	N/A	—	—
June 19, 2010	Dornbirn	Austria	Messe-Stadion Dornbirn	N/A	—	—
June 20, 2010	Lyon	France	Halle Tony Garnier	N/A	—	—
June 22, 2010	Nice	France	Palais Nikaïa	N/A	—	—
June 23, 2010	Marseille	France	Le Dôme de Marseille	N/A	—	—
June 24, 2010	Barcelona	Spain	Poble Espanyol	N/A	—	—
June 26, 2010 (Note: The June 26, 2010 concert at the Festival Grounds in Vitoria, Spain was part of the Azkena Rock Festival.)	Vitoria-Gasteiz	Spain	Mendizabala	N/A	—	—
June 28, 2010	Carcassonne	France	Théâtre Jean-Deschamps	N/A	—	—
June 29, 2010	Bordeaux	France	Patinoire de Mériadeck	N/A	—	—
July 1, 2010	Nantes	France	Zénith de Nantes Métropole	N/A	—	—
July 3, 2010 (Note: The July 3, 2010 concert at The Hop Farm Country Park in Kent, England was part of Hop Farm Festival.)	Kent	England	The Hop Farm Country Park	N/A	—	—
July 4, 2010	Limerick	Ireland	Thomond Park	N/A	—	—
Leg Three — North America
August 4, 2010	Austin	United States	The Backyard	N/A	—	—
August 6, 2010	Oklahoma City	United States	Zoo Amphitheater	Shooter Jennings	—	—
August 7, 2010	Kansas City	United States	Starlight Theatre	The Dough Rollers	—	—
August 8, 2010 (Note: This concert was co-headlined by John Mellencamp.)	Lincoln	United States	Haymarket Park	The Dough Rollers	—	—
August 10, 2010 (Note: The August 10, 2010 concert at the Buffalo Chip Campground in Sturgis, South Dakota was part of Sturgis Rally´s 70th Anniversary Celebration.)	Sturgis	United States	Buffalo Chip Campground	N/A	—	—
August 11, 2010	Billings	United States	Dehler Park	The Dough Rollers	6,842 / 6,842	$376,310
August 12, 2010	Casper	United States	Mike Lansing Field	The Dough Rollers	—	—
August 14, 2010	Jackson	United States	Snow King Resort	The Dough Rollers	—	—
August 15, 2010	Boise	United States	Idaho Botanical Garden	The Dough Rollers	4,027 / 4,027	$201,350
August 17, 2010	Park City	United States	Deer Valley	The Dough Rollers	—	—
August 18, 2010	Las Vegas	United States	The Colosseum at Caesars Palace	N/A	—	—
August 19, 2010	Ontario	United States	Citizens Business Bank Arena	N/A	4,937 / 5,461	$312,925
August 21, 2010 (Note: The August 21, 2010 concert at the Monterey County Fairgrounds in Monterey, California was part of the Monterey County Fair.)	Monterey	United States	Monterey County Fairgrounds	N/A	—	—
August 22, 2010	Stateline	United States	Harveys Outdoor Arena	N/A	—	—
August 24, 2010	Oakland	United States	Fox Oakland Theatre	N/A	—	—
August 25, 2010	San Francisco	United States	The Warfield Theatre	N/A	—	—
August 27, 2010	Bend	United States	Les Schwab Amphitheater	The Dough Rollers	—	—
August 28, 2010	Troutdale	United States	McMenamins Edgefield Amphitheater	The Dough Rollers	—	—
August 29, 2010	Troutdale	United States	McMenamins Edgefield Amphitheater	The Dough Rollers	—	—
August 31, 2010	Missoula	United States	Ogren Park at Allegiance Field	The Dough Rollers	6,938 / 6,938	$376,870
September 1, 2010	Post Falls	United States	Greyhound Park & Event Center	The Dough Rollers	—	—
September 3, 2010	Yakima	United States	Yakima County Stadium	N/A	—	—
September 4, 2010 (Note: The September 4, 2010 concert at the Seattle Center Main Stage in Seattle was part of Bumbershoot.)	Seattle	United States	Seattle Center Main Stage	N/A	—	—
Leg Four — North America
October 6, 2010	Fort Lauderdale	United States	Don Taft University Center	N/A	4,069 / 4,069	$177,792
October 7, 2010	Tampa	United States	USF Sun Dome	N/A	2,147 / 3,000	$93,419
October 8, 2010	Gainesville	United States	O'Connell Center	N/A	—	—
October 10, 2010	Orlando	United States	UCF Arena	N/A	3,441 / 6,525	$147,014
October 11, 2010	Tallahassee	United States	Tallahassee-Leon County Civic Center	N/A	—	—
October 13, 2010	Birmingham	United States	BJCC Concert Hall	N/A	—	—
October 14, 2010	Charlotte	United States	Dale F. Halton Arena	N/A	2,156 / 4,640	$88,290
October 16, 2010	Winston-Salem	United States	LJVM Coliseum	N/A	—	—
October 17, 2010	Clemson	United States	Littlejohn Coliseum	N/A	2,588 / 4,647	$77,045
October 19, 2010	Nashville	United States	Nashville Municipal Auditorium	N/A	—	—
October 21, 2010	St. Louis	United States	Chaifetz Arena	N/A	—	—
October 22, 2010	Champaign	United States	Assembly Hall	N/A	—	—
October 24, 2010	Cedar Falls	United States	McLeod Center	N/A	—	—
October 25, 2010 (Note: The October 25, 2010 concert at the Overture Center in Madison, Wisconsin featured two shows. One at 7pm and another at 10pm.)	Madison	United States	Overture Center	N/A	3,600 / 4,389	$186,240
October 26, 2010	East Lansing	United States	MSU Auditorium	N/A	—	—
October 28, 2010	Ann Arbor	United States	Hill Auditorium	N/A	—	—
October 29, 2010	Kalamazoo	United States	Miller Auditorium	N/A	—	—
October 30, 2010	Chicago	United States	Riviera Theatre	N/A	—	—
October 31, 2010	Indianapolis	United States	Murat Theater	N/A	—	—
November 2, 2010	Akron	United States	E. J. Thomas Hall	N/A	—	—
November 3, 2010	Highland Heights	United States	The Bank of Kentucky Center	N/A	2,329 / 3,500	$90,759
November 4, 2010	Columbus	United States	Value City Arena	N/A	—	—
November 6, 2010	Rochester	United States	Gordon Field House	N/A	—	—
November 7, 2010	Pittsburgh	United States	Petersen Events Center	N/A	—	—
November 9, 2010	University Park	United States	Bryce Jordan Center	N/A	3,187 / 4,225	$108,498
November 10, 2010	Charlottesville	United States	John Paul Jones Arena	N/A	—	—
November 12, 2010	Bethlehem	United States	Stabler Arena	N/A	—	—
November 13, 2010	Washington, D.C.	United States	Charles E. Smith Center	N/A	—	—
November 14, 2010	West Long Branch	United States	Multipurpose Activity Center	N/A	—	—
November 16, 2010	Poughkeepsie	United States	Mid-Hudson Civic Center	N/A	—	—
November 17, 2010	Binghamton	United States	Binghamton University Events Center	N/A	—	—
November 19, 2010	Amherst	United States	William D. Mullins Memorial Center	N/A	—	—
November 20, 2010	Lowell	United States	Tsongas Center	N/A	—	—
November 22, 2010	New York City	United States	Terminal 5	N/A	—	—
November 23, 2010	New York City	United States	Terminal 5	N/A	—	—
November 24, 2010	New York City	United States	Terminal 5	N/A	—	—
November 26, 2010	Atlantic City	United States	Borgata Events Center	N/A	—	—
November 27, 2010	Ledyard	United States	MGM Grand at Foxwoods Theater	N/A	—	—
TOTAL					42,820 / 58,263 (73%)	$2,236,512

== Tour band ==
- Bob Dylan – Vocals, Harmonica, Organ, Guitar
- Charlie Sexton – Guitar
- Stu Kimball – Rhythm Guitar
- George Recelli – Drums, Percussion
- Tony Garnier – Bass
- Donnie Herron – violin, electric mandolin, pedal steel, lap steel
