= When the Deal Goes Down =

2006 song by Bob Dylan

Song by Bob Dylan

from the album Modern Times
- Released: August 29, 2006
- Recorded: February 2006
- Studio: Clinton Recording, New York City
- Genre: Folk; country
- Length: 5:04
- Label: Columbia
- Songwriter: Bob Dylan
- Producer: Bob Dylan (as Jack Frost)

Modern Times track listing
- 10 tracks: 1. "Thunder on the Mountain"; 2. "Spirit on the Water"; 3. "Rollin' and Tumblin'"; 4. "When the Deal Goes Down"; 5. "Someday Baby"; 6. "Workingman's Blues #2"; 7. "Beyond the Horizon"; 8. "Nettie Moore"; 9. "The Levee's Gonna Break"; 10. "Ain't Talkin'"

"When the Deal Goes Down" is a love song written and performed by American singer-songwriter Bob Dylan, originally released as the fourth track on his 2006 album Modern Times and anthologized on the compilation albums Dylan in 2007 and reissues of The Essential Bob Dylan beginning in 2010. As with much of Dylan's 21st-century output, he produced the song himself under the pseudonym Jack Frost.

== Background and composition ==
Dylan had begun composing the song as far back as 2004 when he mentioned to David Gates in a Newsweek interview to promote his memoir Chronicles: Volume One that he was working on a new song based on the melody of "Where the Blue of the Night (Meets the Gold of the Day)", a traditional pop standard associated with Bing Crosby. The title was likely inspired by Robert Johnson's "Last Fair Deal Gone Down", which Dylan had previously quoted in his 1978 single "Changing of the Guards". Lyrically, Dylan juxtaposes phrases appropriated from two poems by Civil War-era poet Henry Timrod with other passages inspired by Biblical texts. The result, according to Philippe Margotin and Jean-Michel Guesdon in their book Bob Dylan All the Songs: The Story Behind Every Track, is that the lyrics of 'When the Deal Goes Down' "are among the most interesting" on Modern Times. As with other Dylan love songs (notably 2020's "I've Made Up My Mind to Give Myself to You"), the song can be interpreted as being addressed to either an individual or a higher power.

== Reception and legacy ==
Spectrum Culture included the song on a list of Dylan's "20 Best Songs of the '00s". In an article accompanying the list, critic David Harris interpreted the "deal" of the title as being a metaphor for death but noted that "Dylan isn’t looking at death with fear. Instead, he chronicles all the different emotions one experiences whilst being alive, knowing that whomever he loves is by his side when it’s time for one of them to pass on".

In a five-star review of Modern Times, The Guardian's Sean O'Hagan saw the song as an example of Dylan "waking with God": "'When the Deal Goes Down' is a distant cousin of 'Let Me Die In My Footsteps', youthful defiance replaced by gritty stoicism. It is also a divine love song. Literally: 'You come to my eyes/ Like a vision from the skies/ I'll be with you when the deal goes down'. You have to go way back beyond Verlaine and Rimbaud, to the likes of Marvell and Donne to hear voices that echo with such metaphysical intimacy".

In their book Bob Dylan All the Songs: The Story Behind Every Track, authors Philippe Margotin and Jean-Michel Guesdon described it as a "sweet retro ballad" that is "successful" because Dylan is "obviously moved by the text".

Ringo Starr named it as his all-time favorite Dylan song in a 2021 interview.

Singer-songwriter Ben Harper also singled out the track for praise in a 2007 profile in the New York Times: "Modern Times is a wicked record. The great thing is, he’s still putting pen to paper. If you can have a song like 'Blowin' in the Wind' in the ’60s and have a song like 'When the Deal Goes Down' in 2006, you’re having an unprecedented run of writing consistently incredible songs".

A 2021 Guardian article included it on a list of "80 Bob Dylan songs everyone should know".

Actor Brad Pitt has a lyric from the song tattooed on his upper torso. The tattoo reads: “We live, we die, we know not why, but I’ll be with you”.

In June 2026, CBS News included the song in its list of the 250 essential American songs of the past 250 years.

== Music video ==
Scarlett Johansson in a screen capture from the "When the Deal Goes Down" music video

Bennett Miller directed an official music video for "When the Deal Goes Down" starring Scarlett Johansson. Complementing the song's nostalgic tone, the acclaimed video, which takes place in the early 1960s and was shot on 8mm film to resemble an old home movie, contains references to Dylan's early life and career through the careful placement of props including: a vintage car with a Minnesota license plate, an antique acoustic guitar, a hardback copy of Woody Guthrie's Bound for Glory and a vinyl copy of a Hank Williams compilation album.

== Live performances ==
Between 2006 and 2013 Dylan performed the song 148 times in concert on the Never Ending Tour. The live debut occurred at Pacific Coliseum in Vancouver, British Columbia, Canada on October 11, 2006, and the last performance (to date) took place at Atlantico in Rome, Italy on November 7, 2013.

== Cover versions ==
Welsh singer Tom Jones covered it on his 2013 album Spirit in the Room.
