= Things Have Changed =

2000 Bob Dylan song

- CD single cover

Single by Bob Dylan

from the album Wonder Boys
- B-side: "Blind Willie McTell" (Live)
- Released: May 1, 2000
- Recorded: May or July 1999
- Genre: Blues rock; folk rock; country rock
- Length: 3:37 (radio edit); 4:59 (video version); 5:09 (full-length version)
- Label: Columbia
- Songwriter: Bob Dylan
- Producer: Bob Dylan

Bob Dylan singles chronology
"Love Sick" (1998)	"Things Have Changed" (2000)	"Someday Baby" (2006)

Audio sample
- "Things Have Changed": file; help

"Things Have Changed" is a song from the film Wonder Boys, written and performed by Bob Dylan and released as a single on May 1, 2000. It won the Academy Award for Best Original Song and the Golden Globe Award for Best Original Song. It was included in the compilation albums The Essential Bob Dylan in 2000, The Best of Bob Dylan in 2005 and Dylan in 2007.

Brian Hiatt, writing in Rolling Stone, where the song placed first on a 2020 list of "The 25 Best Bob Dylan Songs of the 21st Century", saw it as a stylistic about-face from 1997's Daniel Lanois-produced Time Out of Mind and the beginning of an important new chapter in Dylan's career: "The effortless feel of the playful-yet-ominous, hard-grooving, utterly dazzling 'Things Have Changed' was an early indication of the renewed friskiness of Dylan’s 21st-century work — and the vividly live-in-the studio creations he would achieve as his own producer, with the help of engineer Chris Shaw".

== Background and recording ==
The song was inspired by a meeting with country musician Marty Stuart and Stuart's song "The Observations of a Crow" from the concept album The Pilgrim. Dylan critics disagree about when this song was recorded. According to Olof Björner, "Things Have Changed" was recorded in May 1999 at Sterling Sound studios in New York. Clinton Heylin, in his account of Dylan's songs between 1974 and 2008, believes the song was recorded at Sony Studios, New York, probably on July 25 and 26, 1999. On these latter dates, Dylan was touring the US with Paul Simon.

The musicians who accompanied Dylan were his touring band at the time: Charlie Sexton and Larry Campbell on guitar, Tony Garnier on bass and David Kemper on drums and percussion. Kemper said, "We were touring and had a day off in New York. Bob said, 'Tomorrow let's go into the studio. I got a song I want to record.' We went in and played "Things Have Changed" with only an engineer. We did two takes. The first was a New Orleans thing. The second was what you hear. So in about five hours we learned it, recorded it, mixed it."

The engineer Chris Shaw has confirmed there was another version, which "was really great, which had a kind of New Orleans shuffle to it". Shaw hoped to include this unreleased version on Volume 8 of Dylan's Bootleg Series, Tell Tale Signs. When the studio recording could not be located, it was replaced by a live version recorded in Portland, Oregon, on June 15, 2000. The song was recorded in the key of G minor.

=== Mixing ===
Chris Shaw did a rough mix of the song the same day it was recorded, which became the final mix. As he explained to Uncut, "We did 'Things Have Changed' in one afternoon, and when we were done we did a very quick mix of it, and I thought it was just going to be a rough mix to give to Bob who’d maybe give it to someone else, like Daniel Lanois, who’d wind up engineering and mixing the final thing. But it turned out that that rough mix ended up being the final mix. And that was pretty funny, because the very last thing Bob did was raise the shaker up like 10db, making it ridiculously loud, and that was the mix he wanted to go with."

== Themes ==
Clinton Heylin has written that "Things Have Changed" demonstrates a close knowledge of the film Wonder Boys, for which it was written. The lyrics make reference to "dancing lessons", "the jitterbug rag" and dressing "in drag", all of which feature in the plot of the film.

Curtis Hanson, the director of Wonder Boys, has recalled: "I learned that Dylan might be interested in contributing an original song… So when I came back from filming in Pittsburgh, Bob came by the editing room to see some rough cut footage. I told him the story and introduced him to the characters. We talked about Grady Tripp and where he was in life, emotionally and creatively. Weeks later a CD arrived in the mail".

Dylan critic Kees de Graaf places "Things Have Changed" in the context of the Biblical teaching Dylan encountered when he studied with the Vineyard Fellowship in the late 1970s. For de Graaf, the sense that "the world may come to an end at any moment" pervades the song. De Graaf notes the images of "the last train", "all hell may break loose", "standing on the gallows with my head in a noose", all contributing to a sense of impending Armageddon: "the last battle of the end times when all powers from hell will explode in one final outburst of violence".

Dylan critic Michael Gray has commented on the wide range of cultural resources in the song's lyrics, describing it as unique in the way it synthesises the worlds of Percy Bysshe Shelley and Duane Eddy.

Gray sees Dylan's line "I'm looking up into the sapphire-tinted skies" as an allusion to Shelley's phrase "sapphire-tinted skies" in line 71 of "Written among the Euganean Hills, North Italy". "Forty Miles of Bad Road" was a 1959 instrumental hit for Duane Eddy. According to Gray, Eddy's producer Lee Hazlewood heard one Texan say to another, "Your girl has a face like forty miles of bad road", and immediately recognised the remark's potential as a song title.

== Reception ==
=== 2001 Academy Award ===
On March 25, 2001, at the 73rd Academy Awards, "Things Have Changed" was awarded Best Original Song. At the time, Dylan was touring Australia. He and his band performed the song in a segment recorded in Sydney, that was inserted into the Academy Awards broadcast via a satellite link.

In his awards speech, broadcast from Sydney, Dylan said: "I want to thank the members of the Academy who were bold enough to give me this award for this song, which obviously is a song that doesn't pussyfoot around nor turn a blind eye to human nature".

=== Music video and chart position ===
Bob Dylan in the music video for "Things Have Changed"

Curtis Hanson, who directed Wonder Boys, also directed the music video for "Things Have Changed". He intercut footage of Dylan with sequences from the feature film, to suggest that Dylan was interacting with the film's characters. The video appears on the bonus DVD included in the Limited Edition version of Dylan's 2006 album Modern Times.

The single did not enter the Billboard Hot 100 but peaked at No. 2 on Billboard's Adult Alternative Songs chart in May 2000. The single reached No. 58 in the UK Singles Chart in October 2000.

=== Critical response ===
Spectrum Culture included the song on a list of "Bob Dylan's 20 Best Songs of the '90s". In an article accompanying the list, critic Jacob Nierenberg noted that "'Things Have Changed' packages familiar themes—love gone wrong, the inevitability of time, Judgment Day—in a bluesy stomp that begins with Dylan receiving a lap dance from an assassin-eyed woman and peaks with him hauling another off in a wheelbarrow. Is this the same Dylan who sounded like a total doofus on 'Wiggle Wiggle' just a decade earlier? Because this grown-ass man sounds like the coolest cat on the block".

Ultimate Classic Rock critic Matthew Wilkening rated it as the 2nd best song Dylan recorded between 1992 and 2011, saying that it "occupies a nearly perfect middle ground between 1997's pessimistic 'Time Out of Mind' and the then yet-to-be released, more hopeful 2001 album 'Love and Theft'."

The Guardian placed the song 14th on a list of "Bob Dylan's 50 Greatest Songs", calling it "superb" and saying that it sees Dylan "casting a jaundiced eye over a world he feels out of step with, its insistent, shuffling music a backdrop for a series of vibrant portents of impending doom, all dismissed with a grouchy shrug".

In a New Yorker article celebrating Dylan's winning the 2016 Nobel Prize in Literature where different writers were asked to name their favorite Dylan lyrics, critic Amanda Petrusich wrote about being "particularly enamored" with the song's opening verse.

Keith Negus, in a 2021 essay on Bob Dylan's single releases, praised his vocal performance on the track for being perfectly married to the subject matter of the song: "The deceptively quirky production of a lilting, minor-key, country-blues shuffle enhances the way Dylan delivers the lyrics in keeping with the character's world-weariness and increasingly stoned and cynical outlook. As the song progresses it's as if the narrator is becoming too tired to finish a phrase, leaving a pregnant pause before dropping the final words—but, then again, Dylan may also be adopting a trick performed by Sinatra when stretching lines and hesitating before singing the final word or phrase".

A 2021 Guardian article included it on a list of "80 Bob Dylan songs everyone should know".

== Commercial use ==
On February 2, 2014, an arrangement of "Things Have Changed" was used in a commercial for the Chrysler 200, aired during Super Bowl XLVIII. Dylan narrated and starred in the commercial, saying "When it's made here, it's made with the one thing you can't import from anywhere else—American pride ... So let Germany brew your beer, let Switzerland make your watch, let Asia assemble your phone. We will build your car".

== Live performances ==
As of September 17, 2024, Dylan had performed the song 1,001 times. This makes it his tenth most frequently performed live song ever and the only Dylan song since the 1970s on the list of his top 10 most performed songs. A live version from Portsmouth, England was included on the live album Live 1961–2000: Thirty-Nine Years of Great Concert Performances. Dylan also made a surprise televised appearance to perform the song at the American Film Institute Awards 2009 where Wonder Boys star Michael Douglas received the Lifetime Achievement award. The last performance of the song (to date) took place in Buffalo, New York, on September 17, 2024.

== Cover versions ==
"Things Have Changed" has been covered by many artists. Among the very first was country singer Waylon Jennings who made it a staple of his final live shows in 2000 and 2001. Other notable versions include those by Barb Jungr on her 2002 album Every Grain of Sand: Barb Jungr Sings Bob Dylan, The Persuasions on their 2010 album Knockin' on Bob's Door, Curtis Stigers on his 2012 album Let's Go Out Tonight and Bettye LaVette on her 2018 album Things Have Changed, which takes its name from the song. Both Margo Price and Adia Victoria also have performed the song live in arrangements inspired by LaVette's.

== Track listings ==
7-inch vinyl (COL 669379 7) – Limited numbered edition

A "Things Have Changed" – 5:08
B "Blind Willie McTell" (Live version) – 7:01

CD promo single (CSK 46489) – U.S. ["Wonder Boys" motion picture promo]

1. "Things Have Changed" – 5:10 [CD misprint reads 5:25]

CD promo single (COL 669333 1) – Europe

1. "Things Have Changed" (Radio Edit) – 3:37
2. "To Make You Feel My Love" (Live) – 4:10

CD single (COL 669333 2)

1. "Things Have Changed" (Radio Edit) – 3:37
2. "To Make You Feel My Love" (Live) – 4:10
3. "Hurricane" – 8:33
4. "Song to Woody" (Live) – 4:26

Things Have Changed / Dylan Alive Vol. 3 (SRCS 2306) – Japanese extended play CD

1. "Things Have Changed" – 5:09
2. "Highlands" (Live) – 11:19
3. "Blowin' in the Wind" (Live) – 7:10
4. "To Make You Feel My Love" (Live) – 4:11

== Notes ==
- "Blind Willie McTell" recorded live at Jones Beach on August 17, 1997.
- "To Make You Feel My Love" recorded live at Pauley Pavilion, UCLA, Los Angeles on May 21, 1998.
- "Hurricane" taken from the 1976 album Desire.
- "Song to Woody", "Highlands" and "Blowin' in the Wind" recorded live at Santa Cruz Civic Auditorium, Santa Cruz, California on March 16, 2000. This live version of "Highlands" and "Blowin' in the Wind" is available from the bonus CD with The Best of Bob Dylan, Vol. 2 limited edition, while the live version of "Song to Woody" was previously unreleased.
