= Spirit on the Water =

2006 song by Bob Dylan

Song by Bob Dylan

from the album Modern Times
- Released: August 29, 2006
- Recorded: February 2006
- Studio: Clinton Recording, New York City
- Genre: Folk; jazz
- Length: 7:41
- Label: Columbia
- Songwriter: Bob Dylan
- Producer: Bob Dylan (as Jack Frost)

Modern Times track listing
- 10 tracks: 1. "Thunder on the Mountain"; 2. "Spirit on the Water"; 3. "Rollin' and Tumblin'"; 4. "When the Deal Goes Down"; 5. "Someday Baby"; 6. "Workingman's Blues #2"; 7. "Beyond the Horizon"; 8. "Nettie Moore"; 9. "The Levee's Gonna Break"; 10. "Ain't Talkin'"

"Spirit on the Water" is a love ballad written and performed by the American singer-songwriter Bob Dylan, released in 2006 as the second track on his album Modern Times. The title is a reference to a passage in the Book of Genesis. It is notable for being the only song on Modern Times to feature a harmonica solo. As with much of Dylan's 21st-century output, he produced the song himself under the pseudonym Jack Frost.

== Recording ==
Engineer Chris Shaw recalled the recording session for this song fondly as it was the first time Dylan had played harmonica on a studio recording since "Tryin' to Get to Heaven" nearly a decade before: "On Modern Times, we were really excited to have Bob playing harmonica again. That was amazing – I remember sitting there thinking to myself, 'Holy shit. I’m recording Bob Dylan playing harmonica. This is incredible'. I’m a jaded studio guy, y’know, I’ve been working in studios for twenty two years. But every day on (Love and Theft and Modern Times), every day I work with the guy for like five minutes, I’ll be sitting behind that console, and I’ll have this voice in the back of my head: Holy fucking shit. I’m recording Bob Dylan. And all of a sudden the hair on my arm is standing up, and I’m looking around, waiting for someone to barge in and point at me and say, 'He shouldn’t be here'. He’s a blast to work with, Bob. As serious as the guy is, he has an incredibly wicked sense of humour, and he’s actually a lot of fun in the studio. When he’s in a good mood, it’s phenomenal".

== Critical reception ==
Patrick Doyle, writing in Rolling Stone, where the song placed 17th on a list of "The 25 Best Bob Dylan Songs of the 21st Century", calls it a "love song" imbued with a "trancelike feeling". He describes the song as being told from the point-of-view of a narrator who sings about "the joy his lover brings him" before revealing a "cruel and simple twist of fate at the end". Dylan scholar Tony Attwood elaborates on the twist ending as "I love you but I can’t be with you in eternity because I killed a guy in the past" and notes that he can’t think of "any other song that uses that twist".

Spectrum Culture included the song on a list of Dylan's "20 Best Songs of the '00s". In an article accompanying the list, critic David Harris praised the provocative way the song references both the Bible and the blues, writing "Dylan may scoff at people who look for threads like these in his songs, but it’s just part of the fun for Dylanologists to sort through the crumbs, allowing songs like 'Spirit on the Water' to work on so many different levels".

Ultimate Classic Rock critic Matthew Wilkening rated "Spirit on the Water" as the 9th best song Dylan recorded between 1992 and 2011, saying that Dylan "indulges his playful, romantic side on this leisurely, old-fashioned love song" and praising the "unkempt jazz guitar chords and a soft, but cracking snare" as well as the line 'You think I'm over the hill / Think I'm past my prime / Let me see what you got / We can have a whopping good time.'"

In their book Bob Dylan All the Songs: The Story Behind Every Track, authors Philippe Margotin and Jean-Michel Guesdon discuss the song as exhibiting Dylan's "love for jazz", noting that "the atmosphere is light and bright" and that "Dylan sings with his crooner voice, which foreshadows his 2015 album Shadows in the Night".

The Sydney Morning Herald named "Spirit on the Water" one of the "Top five Bob Dylan songs" in a 2021 article, noting that the "swing piano hits a bum note in the first bar but nothing can stop the spring in this dandy crooner’s step". A USA Today article ranking "all of Bob Dylan's songs" placed "Spirit on the Water" 54th (out of 359). A 2021 Guardian article included it on a list of "80 Bob Dylan songs everyone should know".

== Cultural references ==
As with the title of the song, the line "Darkness on the face of the deep" is a reference to a passage in the Book of Genesis.

The line "Can't believe these things would ever fade from your mind" is a verbatim quote from Book 2, Section 4 from Black Sea Letters by the Ancient Roman poet Ovid.

The line "I'm wild about you, gal / You ought to be a fool about me" is a close paraphrase of a line in Sonny Boy Williamson's "Black Gal Blues".

== Live performances ==
Between 2006 and 2018 Dylan performed the song 572 times in concert on the Never Ending Tour. This makes it the second most frequently performed song from Modern Times behind "Thunder on the Mountain". During live performances, it has become commonplace for audience members to yell "No!" after the lines "You think I'm over the hill / You think I'm past my prime" in the final verse. The live debut occurred at Cox Arena in San Diego, California on October 22, 2006 and the last performance (to date) took place at One Spokane Stadium in Spokane, Washington on August 9, 2024.

== Notable covers ==
The song was covered by Denny Freeman (a former Dylan band member who played on the original recording) in an instrumental jazz version on his 2012 album Diggin' on Dylan.

Danish singer-songwriter Steffen Brandt translated the song into Danish and covered it (as "Mørke skygger over vandet") on his 2009 album Baby Blue.
