= Workingman's Blues =

2006 song by Bob Dylan

"Workingman's Blues #2"

Song by Bob Dylan

from the album Modern Times
- Released: August 29, 2006
- Recorded: February 2006
- Studio: Clinton Recording, New York City
- Genre: Folk; rock
- Length: 6:07
- Label: Columbia
- Songwriter: Bob Dylan
- Producer: Bob Dylan (as Jack Frost)

Modern Times track listing
- 10 tracks: 1. "Thunder on the Mountain"; 2. "Spirit on the Water"; 3. "Rollin' and Tumblin'"; 4. "When the Deal Goes Down"; 5. "Someday Baby"; 6. "Workingman's Blues #2"; 7. "Beyond the Horizon"; 8. "Nettie Moore"; 9. "The Levee's Gonna Break"; 10. "Ain't Talkin'"

"Workingman's Blues #2" is a song written and performed by American singer-songwriter Bob Dylan, released as the sixth track on his 2006 album Modern Times. As with much of Dylan's 21st-century output, he produced the song himself under the pseudonym Jack Frost.

== Composition and recording ==
In spite of the song's title, it is not a blues but rather a folk song that uses the same chord pattern as Pachelbel's Canon. Dylan scholar and musicologist Eyolf Ostrem notes that "[m]usically, it is a close cousin of "'Cross the Green Mountain" with which it shares the ever-descending bass line and some of the chord shadings that never manage to decide whether they're major or minor (and which minor they are!)". The song is performed in the sounding key of A major.

In their book Bob Dylan All the Songs: The Story Behind Every Track, authors Philippe Margotin and Jean-Michel Guesdon describe the song, lyrically, as "another example of Dylan's art of creating a song from different pieces, like a puzzle, playfully following his inspiration" and note that the song quotes both American Civil War poet Henry Timrod and country music singer Merle Haggard.

== Critical reception ==
Patrick Doyle, writing in Rolling Stone, where the song placed 23rd on a list of "The 25 Best Bob Dylan Songs of the 21st Century", refers to it as a "sequel" to the 1969 country hit "Workin' Man Blues" by Merle Haggard, with whom Dylan had toured the year before he recorded Modern Times. Doyle characterizes the song as being told from the point of view of a narrator who surveys "bruised relationships and lost battles", and calls it a "hidden gem".

In their book Bob Dylan All the Songs: The Story Behind Every Track, authors Philippe Margotin and Jean-Michel Guesdon describe it as a "ballad with a melody of great subtlety" with lyrics that are "much more profound" than Haggard's and cite it as "one of the high points of the album".

Spectrum Culture included the song on a list of Dylan's "20 Best Songs of the '00s". In an article accompanying the list, critic Ian Maxton sees the song as one of Dylan's most explicitly political: "At a time when the poor and working classes are as diverse as they’ve ever been in this country – and perhaps as powerless as they’re ever been – the song’s powerful closing lines do something more effective than asking us to listen for an answer blowing in the wind, they point to our common enemy".

Dylan scholar and musicologist Eyolf Ostrem also calls it "one of the highlights" of Modern Times and sees it as a descendant of both Dylan's "Ballad of Hollis Brown" from 1963 as well as his role in the Farm Aid initiative in the 1980s.

Seth Bushnell also sees the song as both political and personal, reconciling the two impulses by noting that the "feeling of romantic love is not so far from a love of humanity that fills a human heart when it tries to make the world a better place." Bushnell calls it "heartbreakingly romantic" and "an elegy to Dylan’s heroes and to his own past and a reaffirmation of his love for the common men and women he inspired".

A USA Today article ranking "all of Bob Dylan's songs" placed "Workingman's Blues #2" 58th (out of 359). The Big Issue placed it at #3 on a 2021 list of the "80 best Bob Dylan songs - that aren't the greatest hits", noting "Dylan’s best song of the 21st century matches any of his canonical classics, a paean to the proletariat (and how many songs use that word in their opening verse?), a voice weary but resolute that you hear your own story echoing in, especially if you’ve had one of those days". A 2021 Guardian article included it on a list of "80 Bob Dylan songs everyone should know".

== Cultural references ==
The chorus lines "Meet me at the bottom...Bring me my boots and shoes" refer to a line in the 1946 song "June's Blues" by jazz singer June Christy.

The line "Sing a little bit of these workingman's blues" is a quote from the refrain of Merle Haggard's Workin' Man Blues. (Haggard's response in an interview with the Associated Press: "Good, that gives me a reason to do "Blowin' in the Wind 2'".)

The line "I sleep in the kitchen with my feet in the hall" can be related to the song "A New Salty Dog”, recorded by The Allen Brothers in 1930, where The Allen Brothers sing: "I got a gal she’s six feet tall/ Sleeps in the kitchen with her feet in the hall".

Professor of the classics Richard F. Thomas, in his book Why Dylan Matters, analysed ways in which "Workingman’s Blues #2" draws on Tristia, a collection of poems by Ovid, written during his exile to the Black Sea port of Tomis during the years AD 8 – 17.

Comparison of “Workingman’s Blues #2” with Ovid’s Tristia
“Workingman’s Blues #2”	Ovid: Tristia
"My cruel weapons have been put on the shelf / Come sit down on my knee"	"Show mercy, I beg you, shelve your cruel weapons" (2.179)
"You are dearer to me than myself / As you yourself can see"	"Wife, dearer to me than myself, you yourself can see" (5.14.2)
"Tell me now, am I wrong in thinking/ That you have forgotten me?"	"May the gods grant… / that I’m wrong / In thinking you’ve forgotten me!" (5.13.18)
"No-one can ever claim / That I took up arms against you"	"My cause is better; no-one can claim that I ever took up arms against you" (2.52)
"To lead me off in a cheerful dance"	"or Niobe, bereaved, lead off some cheerful dance" (5.12.8)

== Personnel ==
- Bob Dylan – vocals, guitar, piano
- Denny Freeman – guitar
- Tony Garnier – bass guitar, upright bass
- Donnie Herron – steel guitar, violin, viola, mandolin
- Stu Kimball – guitar
- George G. Receli – drums, percussion

== Live performances ==
Between 2006 and 2018 Dylan performed the song 269 times in concert on the Never Ending Tour. The live debut occurred at Pacific Coliseum in Vancouver, British Columbia, Canada on October 11, 2006 and the last performance (to date) took place at Tucson Music Hall in Tucson, Arizona on October 5, 2018.

== Cover versions ==
The song was covered by Americana singer Lisa Bastoni on her 2019 album How We Want to Live.
