= Modern Times (Bob Dylan album) =

2006 album by Bob Dylan

Studio album by Bob Dylan
- Released: August 29, 2006
- Recorded: February 2006
- Studios: Clinton Recording, New York City
- Genres: Folk rock; blues; rockabilly; Americana
- Length: 63:04
- Label: Columbia
- Producer: Jack Frost (Bob Dylan pseudonym)

Bob Dylan chronology
Blues (2006)	Modern Times (2006)	Dylan (2007)

Bob Dylan studio album chronology
"Love and Theft" (2001)	Modern Times (2006)	Together Through Life (2009)

Singles from Modern Times
- 1. "Someday Baby" Released: August 29, 2006

Modern Times is the thirty-second studio album by American singer-songwriter Bob Dylan, released on August 29, 2006, by Columbia Records. The album was the third work (following Time Out of Mind and "Love and Theft") in a string of critically acclaimed albums by Dylan. It continued its predecessors' tendencies toward blues, rockabilly and pre-rock balladry, and was self-produced by Dylan under the pseudonym "Jack Frost". Despite the acclaim, the album sparked some debate over its uncredited use of choruses and arrangements from older songs, as well as many lyrical lines taken from the work of 19th-century poet Henry Timrod and Roman poet Ovid.

Modern Times became Dylan's first No. 1 album in the U.S. since 1976's Desire. It was also his first album to debut at the summit of the Billboard 200, selling 191,933 copies in its first week. At age 65, Dylan became the oldest living person at the time to have an album enter the Billboard charts at No. 1. It also reached No. 1 in Canada, Australia, New Zealand, Ireland, Denmark, Norway and Switzerland, debuted No. 2 in Germany, Austria and Sweden. It reached No. 3 in the UK and the Netherlands, respectively, and has sold over four million copies worldwide. In the 2012 version of Rolling Stone magazine's list of "The 500 Greatest Albums of All Time", Modern Times was ranked at No. 204.

== Background and recording ==
The album was recorded with Dylan's touring band, including bassist Tony Garnier, drummer George G. Receli, guitarists Stu Kimball and Denny Freeman, plus multi-instrumentalist Donnie Herron. This iteration of the Never Ending Tour band had played with Dylan for the entirety of 2005. Dylan and band rehearsed the songs at the Bardavon 1869 Opera House in Poughkeepsie, New York, in late January and early February, 2006, before heading to New York City to record them. As with its predecessor, Love and Theft, Modern Times was engineered and mixed by Chris Shaw.

Shaw remembered the recording sessions going slower for Modern Times than for "Love and Theft": "The sessions for Modern Times went a little slower, it took maybe a month rather than three weeks. Not for any real reason I can pinpoint. Bob had a lot of ideas to sort through, there were a lot of different versions of each song he had to settle on before he could decide where he wanted them to go, and I think he had this vision in his head that maybe he couldn't quite articulate to the band as quickly, so it took a few times trying out ideas to get it to land where he wanted it to be. And I think there was a lot more lyric writing he had to deal with".

Freeman remembered the sessions as being difficult, though this is something he doesn't think is evident when listening to the album: "Modern Times was a difficult challenge for me. We were feeling our way through it all, and it seemed like it was going really slow, trying to find the songs. Listening to it, I think it's a very coherent album, musically and lyrically and simple, in a good way. Simple in that the melodies and arrangements are 'right there' and the songs sound to me like they would have come together quickly and easily. But that's not the way I remember it happening. Bob seemed frustrated much of the time. But I never really knew what he was thinking, of course".

During a 2006 interview with Rolling Stone, Dylan said: "This is the best band I've ever been in, I've ever had, man for man. When you play with guys a hundred times a year, you know what you can and can't do, what they're good at, whether you want 'em there. It takes a long time to find a band of individual players. Most bands are gangs. Whether it's a metal group or pop rock, whatever, you get that gang mentality. But for those of us who went back further, gangs were the mob. The gang was not what anybody aspired to. On this record (Modern Times) I didn't have anybody to teach. I got guys now in my band, they can whip up anything, they surprise even me".

== Anticipation and release ==
Dylan's historical stature, as well as his renewed critical acclaim following Time Out of Mind and "Love and Theft", helped to make Modern Times a highly anticipated release. As with "Love and Theft" in 2001, Sony held a listening event for critics far in advance, but those invited were forbidden from disclosing details or opinions about what they heard prior to the official release.

Modern Times was leaked online through various BitTorrent and Dylan fan websites on August 21, 2006, after 30-second sound clips were released on the official Sony website. The album was first released in some European countries (including Germany and Ireland) on August 25, in the UK on August 28 and premiered in the U.S. on August 28 on XM Satellite Radio, the satellite radio service that carried Dylan's Theme Time Radio Hour program.

While the album was marketed as the third part of a conceptual trilogy, beginning in 1997 with Time Out of Mind, Dylan himself rebuffed the notion. In an interview with Rolling Stone, he stated that he "would think more of Love and Theft as the beginning of a trilogy, if there's going to be a trilogy".

== Reception and legacy ==
Professional ratings
Aggregate scores
Source	Rating
Metacritic	89/100
Review scores
Source	Rating
AllMusic	4.5/5 stars
The A.V. Club	A
Entertainment Weekly	A
The Guardian	4/5 stars
Mojo	4/5 stars
MSN Music (Consumer Guide)	A+
Pitchfork	8.3/10
Q	4/5 stars
Rolling Stone	5/5 stars
Uncut	5/5 stars

Response to Modern Times from music critics was overwhelmingly positive. On Metacritic, a site that tracks prominent critical opinion, Modern Times holds a score of 89 out of 100, indicating "universal acclaim" and putting it among the 100 most acclaimed albums on the site. In a five-star review, Rolling Stone critic Joe Levy called the album Dylan's "third straight masterwork", while Uncut's Nick Hasted called it a "direct and audacious sequel" to "Love and Theft". Writing for Blender, Robert Christgau described it as "startling [and radiating] the observant calm of old masters who have seen enough life to be ready for anything—Yeats, Matisse, Sonny Rollins". Jody Rosen of Slate concurred, calling Modern Times "a better album than Time Out of Mind and even than the majestic "Love and Theft", which by my lights makes it Dylan's finest since Blood on the Tracks". The album was also credited for original blues and folk rock music which was said to be "hard to hear these days" by critics.

Alexis Petridis of The Guardian, while enjoying Modern Times, felt that it was "not one of those infrequent, unequivocally fantastic Dylan albums" and ridiculed the lavish praise heaped on the album, writing: "It's hard to hear the music of Modern Times over the inevitable standing ovation and the thuds of middle-aged critics swooning in awe." Jim DeRogatis of the Chicago Sun-Times appreciated the lyrical content but found fault in the music, writing that "with the exception of the closing track 'Ain't Talkin'', one of the spookiest songs he's ever written, Dylan disappoints with... [his] inexplicable fondness for smarmy '30s and '40s balladry". Some reviewers who liked the album were critical of its musicianship, such as the Chicago Tribune's Greg Kot, as well as Jon Pareles of The New York Times, who wrote that "onstage Mr. Dylan's touring band regularly supercharges his songs. But on Modern Times the musicians play as if they're just feeling their way into the tunes".

Perhaps the sourest review came from Ron Rosenbaum. Writing in the New York Observer, Rosenbaum called Modern Times, "a wildly overhyped disappointment... The new album is possibly the worst since Self Portrait, with songs that rarely rise above the level of Dylan's low point—and everybody seems afraid to say so".

Modern Times became Dylan's third successive album to top The Village Voice's Pazz & Jop critics' poll, following Time Out of Mind and "Love and Theft". The album also topped Rolling Stone's list of the 50 best albums of 2006, and was later ranked number eight on the magazine's list of the 100 greatest albums of the 2000s. At the 49th Annual Grammy Awards in 2007, Dylan won the Grammy Award for Best Contemporary Folk/Americana Album for Modern Times and the Grammy Award for Best Solo Rock Vocal Performance for the song "Someday Baby".

Elton John is a fan of the album and has cited it as an inspiration for him to try and capture a more live-in-the-studio sound for his 2013 album The Diving Board: "It floored me, that someone of Dylan's great output could come across and make an album like that at his age, which was for me so timeless and sounded so brilliant. I thought, 'Well, if I'm going to make a record again, I've got to make it sort of sounding like that, because that's how I like my records to sound".

== Artwork and versions ==
Because of the length of the songs, the entire album stretched out to two LPs, making it Dylan's third double album in a row.

The album's cover photo is Ted Croner's 1947 photograph Taxi, New York at Night. The image was previously used as a cover by the band Luna for their 1995 single "Hedgehog/23 Minutes in Brussels".

The album was released in both standard and Limited Edition formats, with the special edition including a bonus DVD of four Dylan music videos. The DVD contains "Blood in My Eyes" (Promo Video), "Love Sick" (Live at the Grammys, 1998), "Things Have Changed" (Promo Video) and "Cold Irons Bound" (Masked and Anonymous Video).

== Credit controversy ==
Shortly after its release, the album sparked some debate in the media concerning its songwriting credits, mainly the liner notes' contention of "All songs written by Bob Dylan", which appears in most editions of Modern Times.

=== Adaptations ===
Many of the album's songs have musical roots in well-known older compositions, though in all cases, Dylan has given the songs new lyrics.

- "Rollin' and Tumblin'" is a blues standard first recorded and possibly written by the bluesman Hambone Willie Newbern. An arrangement very similar to Dylan's but with different lyrics was a hit for Muddy Waters, who is also credited with writing the song. Except for the first verse, all the lyrics in Dylan's version are original.
- "When the Deal Goes Down" is based on the melody of "Where the Blue of the Night (Meets the Gold of the Day)", a signature song for Bing Crosby.
- "Someday Baby" is based on an old standard that can be traced back to "Someday Baby Blues", recorded by Sleepy John Estes, and made famous in versions by Lightnin' Hopkins and Muddy Waters. It is sometimes referred to as "Trouble No More", and often credited to Muddy Waters.
- "Beyond the Horizon" is based on the melody of "Red Sails in the Sunset", written by Jimmy Kennedy and Hugh Williams in 1935.
- "The Levee's Gonna Break" is based on "When the Levee Breaks" by Kansas Joe McCoy and Memphis Minnie. It has been previously adapted by rock acts such as Led Zeppelin. The song has also been in the public domain since 2004.

=== Additional sources ===
Two other sources of the album's lyrics were cited in the latter half of 2006. In September, The New York Times ran an article exploring similarities between some of the lyrics in Modern Times and the work of Civil War poet Henry Timrod. Albuquerque disc jockey Scott Warmuth is credited as the first to discover at least ten substantial lines and phrases that can be clearly traced to the poet across several songs. Dylan and Sony have declined to comment on the matter, and Timrod's name is nowhere to be found on the liner notes. Robert Polito of the Poetry Foundation wrote a detailed defense of Dylan's usage of old lines in creating new work, saying that calls of plagiarism confuse "art with a term paper".

In October 2006, The Nelson Mail ran an article by New Zealand poet Cliff Fell exploring similarities between some of the lyrics in Modern Times and the works of the first-century Roman poet Ovid. Fell cited numerous direct parallels between lines from Ovid and those in four of Dylan's songs. A sampling of these included:

Possible sources of lyrics in Modern Times
Song	Concerned line	Possible source text
"Workingman's Blues#2"	no one can claim that I ever took up arms against you.	No one can ever claim/ That I took up arms against you. Ovid (Tristia, Book 2, Lines 51–53)
"Ain't Talkin'"	every nook and corner had its tears.	Every nook and cranny has its tears. Ovid (Tristia, Book 1, Section 3, Line 24)
"The Levee's Gonna Break"	Some people got barely enough skin to cover their bones.	there's barely enough skin to cover my bones. Ovid (Tristia, Book 4, Section 7, Line 51)
"Spirit on the Water"	I cannot believe these things could fade from your mind.	Can't believe these things would ever fade from your mind. Ovid (Black Sea Letters, Book 2, Section 4, Line 24)

Fell considered the borrowings a homage and not plagiarism, noting Dylan's direct reference to Ovid in the album's first song, "Thunder on the Mountain", with the line "I've been sitting down and studying The Art of Love." The Art of Love was one of the great poet's most famous works.

=== Dylan's response to credit controversy ===
None of these previous incarnations or their authors are credited, though Dylan has casually acknowledged some of the uses. In a 2004 Newsweek online feature, Dylan mentioned that he was working on a song based on the melody of a song associated with Bing Crosby, now known to be "When the Deal Goes Down". Dylan has a history of being open about his songwriting techniques, and his usage of older classics. For instance, in a 2004 interview with Robert Hilburn of the Los Angeles Times, he stated,

Well, you have to understand that I'm not a melodist... My songs are either based on old Protestant hymns or Carter Family songs or variations of the blues form. What happens is, I'll take a song I know and simply start playing it in my head. That's the way I meditate. A lot of people will look at a crack on the wall and meditate, or count sheep or angels or money or something, and it's a proven fact that it'll help them relax. I don't meditate on any of that stuff. I meditate on a song. I'll be playing Bob Nolan's "Tumbling Tumbleweeds", for instance, in my head constantly—while I'm driving a car or talking to a person or sitting around or whatever. People will think they are talking to me and I'm talking back, but I'm not. I'm listening to a song in my head. At a certain point, some words will change and I'll start writing a song.

— Bob Dylan, April 4, 2004

The lack of official credits is not a legal problem, given the age of the source material, but it troubled journalist Jim Fusilli of the Wall Street Journal. Fusilli thought that this was contrary to Dylan's long track record of noting his influences, as in the liner notes of 1993's World Gone Wrong. Joe Levy of Rolling Stone claimed to have raised the question with Sony BMG executives, who shrugged it off as a non-issue, on the basis that Ovid had died 1900 years before the release of Dylan's album.

Levy and many others have supported Dylan in the context of a larger, older blues and folk tradition of songwriters evolving old songs into new ones, which Dylan was no stranger to in the 1960s. Pete Seeger himself has previously expressed the view that Dylan is a link in this chain of folk and blues songwriters. Seeger has spoken many times about the folk process, often recounting that his friend Woody Guthrie once said to him "That guy stole that from me, but I steal from everybody". Ramblin' Jack at one time expressed similar sentiments: "Dylan learned from me the same way I learned from Woody. Woody didn't teach me. He just said, 'If you want to learn something, just steal it—that's the way I learned from Lead Belly'".

== Track listing ==
All tracks are written by Bob Dylan.

Modern Times track listing
No.	Title	Length
1.	"Thunder on the Mountain"	5:55
2.	"Spirit on the Water"	7:41
3.	"Rollin' and Tumblin'"	6:02
4.	"When the Deal Goes Down"	5:04
5.	"Someday Baby"	4:56
6.	"Workingman's Blues #2"	6:07
7.	"Beyond the Horizon"	5:36
8.	"Nettie Moore"	6:53
9.	"The Levee's Gonna Break"	5:43
10.	"Ain't Talkin'"	8:48
Total length:		63:04

== Personnel ==
- Bob Dylan – vocals, guitar, harmonica, piano

Additional musicians

- Denny Freeman – guitar
- Tony Garnier – bass guitar, cello, upright bass
- Donnie Herron – steel guitar, violin, viola, mandolin
- Stu Kimball – guitar
- George G. Receli – drums, percussion

Technical personnel

- Greg Calbi – mastering engineering
- Chris Shaw – engineering
- Tom Aiezza – assistant engineer
- Sheldon Yellowhair – assistant engineer

== Charts ==
=== Weekly charts ===
Weekly chart performance for Modern Times
Chart (2006)	Peak position
Australian Albums (ARIA)	1
Austrian Albums (Ö3 Austria)	1
Belgian Albums (Ultratop Flanders)	2
Belgian Albums (Ultratop Wallonia)	5
Canadian Albums (Billboard)	1
Croatian International Albums (HDU)	1
Danish Albums (Hitlisten)	1
Dutch Albums (Album Top 100)	2
Finnish Albums (Suomen virallinen lista)	4
French Albums (SNEP)	17
German Albums (Offizielle Top 100)	2
Irish Albums (IRMA)	1
Italian Albums (FIMI)	2
New Zealand Albums (RMNZ)	1
Norwegian Albums (VG-lista)	1
Polish Albums (ZPAV)	30
Portuguese Albums (AFP)	12
Spanish Albums (Promusicae)	5
Swedish Albums (Sverigetopplistan)	2
Swiss Albums (Schweizer Hitparade)	1
UK Albums (Official Charts)	3
US Billboard 200	1
US Top Rock Albums (Billboard)	1

=== Year-end charts ===
Year-end chart performance for Modern Times
Chart (2006)	Position
Australian Albums (ARIA)	82
Austrian Albums (Ö3 Austria)	54
Belgian Albums (Ultratop Flanders)	35
Dutch Albums (Album Top 100)	44
German Albums (Offizielle Top 100)	58
Swedish Albums (Sverigetopplistan)	16
Swiss Albums (Schweizer Hitparade)	55
UK Albums (OCC)	78
US Billboard 200	85
US Top Rock Albums (Billboard)	14

== Certifications ==
Certifications for Modern Times
Region	Certification	Certified units/sales
Australia (ARIA)	Platinum	70,000^{^}
Canada (Music Canada)	Platinum	100,000^{^}
Denmark (IFPI Danmark)	Platinum	40,000^{^}
Germany (BVMI)	Gold	100,000^{‡}
Ireland (IRMA)	Platinum	15,000^{^}
New Zealand (RMNZ)	Platinum	15,000^{^}
Switzerland (IFPI Switzerland)	Gold	15,000^{^}
United Kingdom (BPI)	Platinum	300,000^{^}
United States (RIAA)	Platinum	1,010,000
^{^} Shipments figures based on certification alone.^{‡} Sales+streaming figures based on certification alone.
