= Silvio (song) =

1988 single by Bob Dylan

- Cover of the 12" US promotional single.

Single by Bob Dylan (with the Grateful Dead)

from the album Down in the Groove
- B-side: "Driftin' Too Far from Shore" (US/Canada/Australia); "When Did You Leave Heaven?" (Europe)
- Released: May 1988
- Recorded: June 16, 1987
- Studio: Sunset Sound Studios
- Genre: Folk rock; roots rock
- Length: 3:05
- Label: Columbia
- Songwriters: Bob Dylan; Robert Hunter

Bob Dylan (with the Grateful Dead) singles chronology
"The Usual" (1987)	"Silvio" (1988)	"Everything Is Broken" (1989)

"Silvio" is a folk rock song written by Bob Dylan and Robert Hunter and released by Dylan as the seventh track (or second song on Side 2) of his 1988 album Down in the Groove. Performed alongside the Grateful Dead, the song was released as the album's only single and spent eight weeks on Billboard's Mainstream Rock chart, peaking at #5 on July 1, 1988.

The song became a staple of Dylan's live shows during the Never Ending Tour and was later anthologized on the albums Bob Dylan's Greatest Hits Volume 3 in 1994, The Essential Bob Dylan in 2000 and Dylan in 2007.

== Composition and recording ==
"Silvio" is one of two songs co-written by Dylan and longtime Grateful Dead associate Robert Hunter on Down in the Groove (along with "Ugliest Girl in the World"). Hunter and Dylan would also later co-write most of the songs on Dylan's 2009 album Together Through Life as well as the 2012 song "Duquesne Whistle". The track was recorded the year after Dylan had toured with the Grateful Dead as his backing group and is notable for featuring three members of that band singing backing vocals: Jerry Garcia, Bob Weir and Brent Mydland. The song is performed in the key of G major.

== Critical reception and legacy ==
In their book Bob Dylan All the Songs: The Story Behind Every Track, authors Philippe Margotin and Jean-Michel Guesdon call the song "the gem of the album", noting that the "rhythm is irresistible, and the combination of acoustic guitar (Dylan), drums, and bass works magnificently".

In Rolling Stone, critic David Fricke notes that "the song's bright, rhythmic bounce and earthy folk-rock sound - sort of "Subterranean Homesick Blues" meets American Beauty - makes you wonder what might have happened if Dylan and the Dead had followed up their '87 stadium tour with some serious studio work together".

Cash Box called it a "bouncy and catchy track".

Spectrum Culture included the song on a list of "Bob Dylan's 20 Best Songs of the 1980s". In an article accompanying the list, critic Pat Padua calls it "great pop, and oddly prescient".

Singer/songwriter Warren Zevon loved the song and, according to his collaborator Jorge Calderón, "wrote out every part the arrangement".

Former U.S. President Barack Obama included the song on his annual "Summer Playlist" for 2024.

== Live performances ==
From 1988 to 2024, Dylan played the song 596 times on the Never Ending Tour. A live version performed in Tampa, Florida on January 30, 1999, was made available to stream on Dylan's official website in May 1999. The live debut occurred at the Blossom Music Center in Cuyahoga Falls, Ohio on June 21, 1988, and the last performance (to date) took place in Tinley Park, Illinois on September 7, 2024.

== Cultural references ==
The line "I'm an old boll weevil looking for a home" is a reference to the traditional folk song "Boll Weevil", which had been popularized by Lead Belly's recording in 1934.

== Notable cover versions ==
- Grayson Capps from the compilation album Bob Dylan in the 80s: Volume One (2014)
- Mello from the album Blowin' in the Wind - A Reggae Tribute to Bob Dylan (2002)
- Joe Russo’s Almost Dead- 3/02/2019 Portland, ME
