= Nettie Moore (song) =

2006 song by Bob Dylan

Song by Bob Dylan

from the album Modern Times
- Released: August 29, 2006
- Recorded: February 2006
- Studio: Clinton Recording, New York City
- Genre: Folk
- Length: 6:53
- Label: Columbia
- Songwriter: Bob Dylan
- Producer: Bob Dylan (as Jack Frost)

Modern Times track listing
- 10 tracks: 1. "Thunder on the Mountain"; 2. "Spirit on the Water"; 3. "Rollin' and Tumblin'"; 4. "When the Deal Goes Down"; 5. "Someday Baby"; 6. "Workingman's Blues #2"; 7. "Beyond the Horizon"; 8. "Nettie Moore"; 9. "The Levee's Gonna Break"; 10. "Ain't Talkin'"

"Nettie Moore" is a folk love song written and performed by American singer-songwriter Bob Dylan, released in 2006 as the eighth track on his album Modern Times. As with much of Dylan's 21st-century output, he produced the song himself under the pseudonym Jack Frost.

== Composition and recording ==
The song is characterized by unusually spare (for late-period Dylan) musical backing and a memorable vocal melody that sees Dylan's voice rise and fall with the delivery of each line in the verse. Speaking to USA Today's Edna Gunderson, Dylan said that "Nettie Moore", more than any other song on Modern Times, “troubled me the most, because I wasn’t sure I was getting it right. Finally, I could see what the song is about. This is coherent, not just a bunch of random verses. I knew I wanted to record this. I was pretty hyped up on the melodic line”. The song is performed in the sounding key of B major.

== Critical reception ==
Jon Dolan, writing in Rolling Stone, where the song placed eighth on a list of "The 25 Best Bob Dylan Songs of the 21st Century", noted that, although it has lyrical roots in the 1857 James Lord Pierpont and Marshall S. Pike composition "Gentle Nettie Moore" and other pre-20th century folk songs, Dylan's "Nettie Moore" nonetheless "feels so personal" to the songwriter because of the way he sings of wandering the earth and being "in a cowboy band".

Spectrum Culture included the song on a list of Dylan's "20 Best Songs of the '00s". In an article accompanying the list, critic Tyler Dunston also sees the song as a "personal account", noting that "Dylan conflates the myth of a version of himself with American music, the story of which is deeply entangled with mythology and history—from the Faustian fiction of Robert Johnson’s legendary guitar skill to the very real histories of oppression that blues and folk music arise out of and document. It is one of the great ironies of the history of the blues that the racial discrimination which they so often documented is itself responsible for the fact that the early history of the blues is so poorly documented. Dylan knows it is impossible to fill these gaps, but he weaves an incomplete tapestry anyway. (We may see his supposed 'plagiarism' as a kind of scattered history.)"

In their book Bob Dylan All the Songs: The Story Behind Every Track, authors Philippe Margotin and Jean-Michel Guesdon praise the song's "very creative arrangement, including a highly streamlined rhythm section...and cello playing pizzicato as well as with the bow" and call it "one of the best songs on Modern Times".

Singer/songwriter Patti Smith included it on a playlist of her "16 favorite Bob Dylan love songs." On the opposite end of the spectrum, historian Sean Wilentz, seeing darker implications in the line "No knife could ever cut our love apart", interprets the song as being an oblique murder ballad in his book Bob Dylan's America.

A USA Today article ranking "all of Bob Dylan's songs" placed "Nettie Moore" 24th (out of 359).

Jokermen Podcast placed the song 9th on their ranking of Dylan's top 100 post-1966 songs.

== Cultural references ==
The line "Blues this mornin' fallin' down like a hail" paraphrases a line from Robert Johnson's "Hellhound on My Trail".

The line "They say whisky'll kill you, but I don't think it will" is a reference to the traditional folk song "Moonshiner".

The line "Albert's in the graveyard, Frankie's raising hell" is a reference to the traditional folk song "Frankie and Albert".

The line "I'm going where the Southern crosses the Yellow Dog" is a reference to the earliest known blues lyric. At a train station in Tutwiler, Mississippi in 1903, W. C. Handy heard a Black man playing a blues song on a steel guitar using a knife as a slide. The man repeatedly sang the phrase, "Goin’ where the Southern cross’ the Dog”, which Handy later popularized in his own 1914 song “Yellow Dog Blues”.

== Live Performances ==
Between 2006 and 2012 Dylan performed the song 142 times in concert on the Never Ending Tour. The live debut occurred at ARCO Arena in Sacramento, California on October 18, 2006 and the last performance (to date) took place at Rexall Place in Edmonton, Alberta, Canada on October 9, 2012.

== Cover versions ==
The song was covered by Born 53 on their 2012 album Thieving in the Alley and Muscle & Bone on their 2013 album Masterpieces of Bob Dylan.
