= Ain't Talkin' =

2006 song by Bob Dylan

"Ain't Talkin' "

Song by Bob Dylan

from the album Modern Times
- Released: August 29, 2006
- Recorded: February 2006
- Studio: Clinton Recording, New York City
- Genre: Folk rock; Americana
- Length: 8:48
- Songwriter: Bob Dylan
- Producer: Bob Dylan (as Jack Frost)

Modern Times track listing
- 10 tracks: 1. "Thunder on the Mountain"; 2. "Spirit on the Water"; 3. "Rollin' and Tumblin'"; 4. "When the Deal Goes Down"; 5. "Someday Baby"; 6. "Workingman's Blues #2"; 7. "Beyond the Horizon"; 8. "Nettie Moore"; 9. "The Levee's Gonna Break"; 10. "Ain't Talkin'"

Audio sample
- file; help

"Ain't Talkin'" is a song written and performed by the American singer-songwriter Bob Dylan, appearing as the tenth and final track on his 2006 album Modern Times. As with most of Dylan's 21st century output, he produced the song himself under the pseudonym Jack Frost.

== Composition and recording ==
"Ain't Talkin'" is a minor-key folk song that stands, at 8:48, as the longest track on Modern Times. In their book Bob Dylan All the Songs: The Story Behind Every Track, authors Philippe Margotin and Jean-Michel Guesdon compare "Ain't Talkin'" to "Highlands", the closing song on Dylan's 1997 album Time Out of Mind, in that both feature a "lone pilgrim" narrator, although they argue that "Ain't Talkin'" is the bleaker of the two tracks since its narrator hasn't yet found his "final destination". They describe the music as a "fresco with multiple sonic colors (viola, arpeggiated style on acoustic guitar, upright bass)" and note that although Dylan sings in "a searching, even resigned tone", the shift to a major key at the end of the song suggests "optimism".

== Themes ==
An essay on Christianity and Modern Times by Andrew McCarron, published in the book The World of Bob Dylan in 2021, discusses "Ain't Talkin'" as exemplifying the difficulty of living a morally upright life: "Proverbs 21 states 'Whoever pursues righteousness and love finds life, prosperity and honor'. Likewise the songs on Modern Times equate righteous living with redemptive hope, no matter how faint the promise may be...But a life of good works is challenging, especially in an eye for an eye world in which survival necessitates moral compromise, not to mention that evil dwells in every heart. These impediments, one situational and the other conditional, are named in the second stanza of "Ain't Talkin'": 'They say prayer has the power to help / So pray for me mother / In the human heart an evil spirit can dwell / I'm trying to love my neighbor and do good unto others / But oh, mother, things ain't going well'".

In the same book, however, another essay by Elliot R. Wolfson analyzes "Ain't Talkin'", and the same stanza, in particular, through the lens of Judaism: "In "Ain't Talkin'", Dylan laments his being inconsolable and estranged in this world...The poet appeals to walking as opposed to talking as the means by which he traverses through 'the weary world of woe'. The heart is still enflamed with craving even if no one seems to know. Once more, Dylan mentions prayer as a possible intervention to help. We must pray specifically from the mother - perhaps an allusion to the Shekhinah, the feminized persona of the divine presence according to the theosophic symbolism of the kabbalah - in spite of the fact that evil dwells in the human heart".

== Critical reception ==
In a 2006 review of Modern Times, The Guardian critic Kitty Greene wrote, "The superlative final sally, "Ain't Talkin'", does what all last tracks should do: make you want to hear the whole thing again. It's a lengthy, mysterious blues-noir; virtually magic-realist in places".

Allmusic's Thom Jurek wrote about the song, "The great irony is in the final track, "Ain't Talkin'", where a lonesome fiddle, piano, and hand percussion spill out a gypsy ballad that states a yearning, that amounts to an unsatisfied spiritual hunger. The pilgrim wanders, walks, and aspires to do good unto others, though he falters often—he sometimes even wants to commit homicide. It's all part of the 'trawl' of living in the world today".

Music journalist Andy Greene, writing in Rolling Stone, where "Ain't Talkin'" placed third on a list of "The 25 Best Bob Dylan Songs of the 21st Century", commented: "It's a song about a journey through a desolate, violent landscape straight out of Cormac McCarthy's The Road, and nearly every line drips with doom and dread. This is Dylan at his bone-chilling best".

Spectrum Culture included the song on a list of Dylan's "20 Best Songs of the '00s". In an article accompanying the list, critic Jacob Nierenberg called the song one of Dylan's darkest, noting "the end times are hardly new ground for Dylan to cover, but rarely has the man portrayed himself as such a ruinous and malevolent force, akin to DMX or Anton Chigurh: A criminal prosecutor might be driven to press charges after hearing Dylan mutter 'If I catch my opponents ever sleepin' / I'll just slaughter 'em where they lie'...Unlike the Stanley Brothers song that inspired its title, 'Ain't Talkin' betrays no trace of regret, just a thirst for revenge. It's a mode Dylan has only written in a few times, and bettered even fewer".

A 2021 Consequence article ranking Dylan's top 15 albums placed Modern Times 10th, citing "Ain't Talkin'" as the highlight and praising Dylan's use of appropriation in it, calling it "one of Dylan's greatest strengths in the twilight years of his career, using these elements as building blocks for something completely new, in the same way that producers in the golden age of hip-hop constructed beats from familiar samples. "Ain't Talkin'", Modern Times' bone-chilling closer, swipes lines from the traditional 'The Wayfaring Stranger' and The Stanley Brothers' 'Highway of Regret', then flips the songs' sentiments on their head: It's not deliverance that Dylan's yearning for, but vengeance, vowing to slit his enemies' throats in their beds. He's sung about the world's end before, but on 'Ain't Talkin'', Dylan himself sounds apocalyptic, like he's the last thing his wrongdoers will see before they die".

The Big Issue placed it at #45 on a 2021 list of the "80 best Bob Dylan songs - that aren't the greatest hits". A 2021 Guardian article included it on a list of "80 Bob Dylan songs everyone should know". Singer/songwriter Elliott Murphy cited it as one of Dylan's top 10 songs of the 21st century in an article for Poetic Justice Magazine.

== Cultural references ==
The song derives some of its chorus from the "Highway of Regret" by Don Anthony and Ralph Stanley. The line "through this weary world of woe" is a nod to the traditional "Wayfaring Stranger".

Numerous phrases in the song have been traced to the ancient Roman poet Ovid. Richard F. Thomas, the George Martin Lane Professor of the Classics at Harvard University, noted in an interview that the song's final line "In the last outback, at the world's end" is a "direct quote from Peter Green's Penguin translation of Ovid's exile poetry [Ex Ponto 2.7.66]. In case you think this is accidental, the same song has three or four other Ovidian lines or significant phrases, including: 'Every nook and cranny/corner has its tears' … 'loyal and much loved companions' … 'make the most of one last extra hour', all on one song from Tristia 1.3 [24, 65, 68], Ovid's night of exile poem".

The line "Hand Me Down My Walking Cane" refers to the song of that name: a minstrel song credited to James A. Bland, which has become a folk song.

== Live performances ==
Dylan played the song 118 times on the Never Ending Tour between its live debut in 2006 and its last performance in 2013. The live debut occurred at New York City Center on November 20, 2006 and the last performance (to date) took place at Atlantico in Rome, Italy on November 7, 2013.

== Other versions ==
An earlier take of the song from the Modern Times recording sessions, without the long instrumental intro or outro and featuring somewhat different lyrics (with no references to the work of Ovid), appeared on the 2008 Dylan compilation The Bootleg Series Vol. 8 – Tell Tale Signs: Rare and Unreleased 1989–2006.

== Notable covers ==
- Julie Felix covered it on her 2008 album Highway of Diamonds.
- Bettye LaVette covered it on her 2018 album Things Have Changed.
- Bertrand Belin adapted it in French under the title Le Feu au Coeur in his album Persona (2019).
