= Thunder on the Mountain =

2006 song by Bob Dylan

- European CD single cover

Song by Bob Dylan

from the album Modern Times
- Released: August 29, 2006
- Recorded: February 2006
- Studio: Clinton Recording, New York City
- Genre: Folk rock; rock and roll; rockabilly
- Length: 5:55
- Label: Columbia
- Songwriter: Bob Dylan
- Producer: Bob Dylan (as Jack Frost)

Modern Times track listing
- 10 tracks: 1. "Thunder on the Mountain"; 2. "Spirit on the Water"; 3. "Rollin' and Tumblin'"; 4. "When the Deal Goes Down"; 5. "Someday Baby"; 6. "Workingman's Blues #2"; 7. "Beyond the Horizon"; 8. "Nettie Moore"; 9. "The Levee's Gonna Break"; 10. "Ain't Talkin'"

"Thunder on the Mountain" is a song written and performed by American singer-songwriter Bob Dylan, released in 2006 as the first track on his album Modern Times. Like much of Dylan's 21st century output, he produced the song himself under the pseudonym Jack Frost.

The song had considerable success, garnering more airtime on U.S. radio than any track on the album next to "Someday Baby". Even though it was not released as a single in America, it still managed to spend nine weeks on Billboard's Adult Alternative Songs chart, peaking at #22 in January 2007. It was released as a single in various European countries in late 2006 and early 2007.

== Composition and recording ==
In their book Bob Dylan All the Songs: The Story Behind Every Track, authors Philippe Margotin and Jean-Michel Guesdon note that, lyrically, the song juxtaposes references to religion and romance. They describe the music as having "a touch of Chuck Berry's style, particularly in the guitar licks and riffs reminiscent of 'Let It Rock'" and claim that "[t]his rock song is a good way to open Modern Times, even if its overall style is fairly standard. The sound and production are similar to that of Love and Theft, and Dylan's new musicians are excellent".

== Critical reception ==
Andy Greene, writing in Rolling Stone, where the song placed ninth on a list of "The 25 Best Bob Dylan Songs of the 21st Century", noted an ironic counterpoint between the song's upbeat sound, "somewhere between rockabilly and Western swing", and its apocalyptic lyrics: "[T]he song has some not-atypical judgment-day-is-coming, woe-to-mankind overtones, but this time Dylan seems pretty cheerful about it all".

Spectrum Culture included the song on a list of Dylan's "20 Best Songs of the '00s". In an article accompanying the list, critic John Paul praised Dylan's lyrics for "such brilliant verbal choices as rhyming 'sons of bitches' with 'orphanages' and the made-for-each-other couplet, 'I got the pork chops, she got the pie / She Ain’t no angel and neither am I'...Nearly half a century into his legendary career, he still managed to keep people scratching their heads while tapping their feet and nodding along to the infectious flow of his delivery and impeccable backing musicians".

Ultimate Classic Rock critic Matthew Wilkening rated "Thunder on the Mountain" as Dylan's 6th best song he recorded between 1992 and 2011, saying that "the only thing more surprising than how powerfully and effortlessly Dylan and his band" perform the song is that Dylan knows who Alicia Keys is.

NJ Arts critic Jay Lustig identified it as his favorite song on Modern Times and referred to it as "the rollicking opening track...which manages to be both grandly mythical and deeply quirky".

== Cultural references ==
Dylan references his former residence, Hell's Kitchen, Manhattan and a former resident, Alicia Keys. He claims to have been inspired to write the song after admiring Keys' performance at the 2002 Grammy Awards. These lines, however, are themselves a veiled reference to the Memphis Minnie song "Ma Rainey".

The line "I've been sitting down studying The Art of Love" is the first of many references to the Ancient Roman poet Ovid on Modern Times.

The song is studded with biblical allusions: The title, for example, evokes the divine presence at Mount Sinai in the Book of Exodus while the line "Today's the day I'm gonna grab my trombone and blow" suggests Dylan himself playing the role of the archangel Gabriel blowing his horn.

== Music video ==
Screen capture from the "Thunder on the Mountain" music video

An official music video was made for the song, which consists entirely of archival footage of many of Dylan's film and television performances over the decades - from the mid-1960s through the early 21st century. The video premiered at Slate on December 8, 2006. Popsugar called the video "a great trip, chronicling the many guises of the formerly nostalgia-phobic Bob over the years".

== Live performances ==
As of December 8, 2019, the date of its most recent outing, he has performed the song live 788 times. This makes it the most frequently played song from Modern Times by a significant margin. The live debut occurred at KeyArena in Seattle, Washington on October 13, 2006, and the last performance (to date) took place at The Anthem in Washington, D.C., on December 8, 2019.

== Notable covers ==
The song was covered by The Grateful Dead's Phil Lesh and The Allman Brothers Band's Warren Haynes at a live charity concert benefiting the Music for Youth Foundation at Lincoln Center in New York City on November 9, 2006.

American rockabilly singer Wanda Jackson recorded a version of the song, produced and featuring lead guitar by Jack White, that was released as a single and on Jackson's The Party Ain't Over album in 2011. In Jackson's version, the name "Jerry Lee" was substituted for "Alicia Keys". According to Jackson, it was Dylan's idea that she record the song: "Jack and Bob have, I think, a rather special relationship, so Jack wanted me to do a song of [Dylan's], and he called him and asked which song would he choose? And Bob Dylan is also a fan of mine, which I wasn't aware of, and he said, 'Well, it has to be "Thunder on the Mountain". There's just no doubt about that'".

Former Rolling Stones bassist Bill Wyman covered it for his 2024 album Drive My Car in an arrangement that combined elements from Dylan's original studio version and Wanda Jackson's cover.
