= List of awards and nominations received by True Blood =

This is the list of awards and nominations for the TV series True Blood.

== By awards ==
=== American Cinema Editors ===
Year	Category	Nominee	Result	Ref
2009	Best Edited One-Hour Series for Television	Michael Ruscio & Andy Keir (for "Strange Love")	Won	
2010	Best Edited One-Hour Series for Non-Commercial Television	Louise Innes (for "Hard-Hearted Hannah")	Nominated	

=== American Film Institute Awards ===
Year	Category	Nominee	Result	Ref
2009	One of the 10 Best TV Programs of 2009		Won	

=== Art Directors Guild ===
Year	Category	Nominee	Result	Ref
2009	Episode of a One Hour Single-Camera Television Series	Suzuki Ingerslev (for "Burning House of Love")	Nominated	
2010	Episode of a One Hour Single-Camera Television Series	Suzuki Ingerslev (for "Never Let Me Go")	Nominated	
2011	Episode of a One Hour Single-Camera Television Series	Suzuki Ingerslev (for "Trouble")	Nominated	

=== BMI Awards ===
Year	Category	Nominee	Result	Ref
2009	True Blood Original Score	Nathan Barr	Won	
2009	True Blood Theme Song	Jace Everett	Won	
2010	Composers of Featured Music for Cable TV	Nathan Barr and Jace Everett	Won	

=== Bravo A-List Awards ===
Year	Category	Nominee	Result	Ref
2009	A-List TV Show		Nominated	
2009	Sexiest TV Moment	Bill and Sookie's Love Scene	Nominated	

=== ASTRA Awards ===
Year	Category	Nominee	Result	Ref
2012	Favorite International Show - Drama		Nominated	

=== British Academy Television Awards ===
Year	Category	Nominee	Result	Ref
2010	Best International TV Show		Nominated	

=== Costume Designers Guild ===
Year	Category	Nominee	Result	Ref
2010	Excellence in Period or Fantasy Costume Design for Television Series	Audrey Fisher	Nominated	

=== Emmy Awards ===
Year	Category	Nominee	Result	Ref
2009	Outstanding Main Title Design	Rama Allen, Shawn Fedorchuk, Matthew Mulder, Morgan Henry, Camm Rowland & Ryan Gagnier	Nominated	
2009	Outstanding Casting for a Drama Series	Junie Lowry Johnson & Libby Goldstein	Won	
2009	Outstanding Art Direction for a Single-Camera Series	Suzuki Ingerslev, Cat Smith & Rusty Lipscomb (for "Burning House of Love", "Cold Ground" & "Sparks Fly Out")	Nominated	
2009	Breakthrough Performance (online voting)	Sookie meets Bill	Won	
2010	Outstanding Drama Series		Nominated	
2010	Outstanding Casting for a Drama Series	Junie Lowry Johnson & Libby Goldstein	Nominated	
2010	Outstanding Art Direction for a Single-Camera Series	Suzuki Ingerslev, Cat Smith & Laura Richarz (for "Never Let Me Go", "I Will Rise Up" and "Frenzy")	Nominated	
2010	Outstanding Makeup for a Series, Miniseries, Movie or a Special	Brigette Ellis, Ned Neidhardt, Bernhard Eichholz, Anthony Barlow, Sam Polin, Danielle Noe, Todd Masters & Daniel Rebert (for "Scratches")	Nominated	
2010	Outstanding Sound Editing for a Series	John Benson, Jason Krane, Stuart Martin, Brian Thomas Nist, Bruno Coon, Zane Bruce & Jeff Gunn (for "Beyond Here Lies Nothin'")	Nominated	
2011	Outstanding Art Direction for a Single-Camera Series	Suzuki Ingerslev, Cat Smith and Laura Richarz (for "Beautifully Broken", "It Hurts Me Too" and "Trouble")	Nominated	
2011	Outstanding Makeup for a Single-Camera Series (Non-Prosthetic)	Brigette Myre Ellis and Lana Horochowski (for "9 Crimes")	Nominated	
2011	Outstanding Guest Actress in a Drama Series	Alfre Woodard	Nominated	
2011	Outstanding Sound Editing for a Series	John Benson, Jason Krane, Christian Buenaventura, Steve Stuhr, Stuart Martin, Fred Judkins, Eduardo Ponsdomenech, Zane Bruce and Jeff Gunn (for "Hitting the Ground")	Nominated	
2013	Outstanding Art Direction for a Single-Camera Series	Suzuki Ingerslev, Cat Smith and Ron V. Franco (for "Whatever I Am, You Made Me")	Nominated	
2014	Outstanding Art Direction for a Contemporary or Fantasy Series (Single-Camera)	Suzuki Ingerslev, Cat Smith and Ron V. Franco (for "At Last", "Fuck the Pain Away" and "In the Evening")	Nominated	
2014	Outstanding Stunt Coordination for a Drama Series, Miniseries or Movie	Hiro Koda	Nominated	

=== Ewwy Awards ===
Year	Category	Nominee	Result	Ref
2009	Best Drama Series		Won	
2009	Best Supporting Actor in a Drama Series	Nelsan Ellis	Won	
2010	Best Supporting Actress in a Drama Series	Michelle Forbes	Nominated	
2010	Best Supporting Actor in a Drama Series	Ryan Kwanten	Nominated	

=== Genesis Awards ===
Year	Category	Nominee	Result	Ref
2011	Dramatic Series	"Hitting the Ground"	Won	

=== GLAAD Media Awards ===
Year	Category	Nominee	Result	Ref
2009	Outstanding Drama Series		Nominated	
2010	Outstanding Drama Series		Nominated	
2011	Outstanding Drama Series		Won	

=== Golden Globe Awards ===
Year	Category	Nominee	Result	Ref
2008	Best Television Series – Drama		Nominated	
2008	Best Performance by an Actress in a Television Series – Drama	Anna Paquin	Won	
2009	Best Television Series – Drama		Nominated	
2009	Best Performance by an Actress in a Television Series – Drama	Anna Paquin	Nominated	

=== Grammy Awards ===
Year	Category	Nominee	Result	Ref
2010	Best Compilation Soundtrack Album for Motion Picture or Television	Season One Soundtrack CD	Nominated	
2011	Best Song Written for a Motion Picture or Television	"Kiss Like Your Kiss" (by Lucinda Williams and Elvis Costello)	Nominated	
2011	Best Compilation Soundtrack Album for Motion Picture or Television	Season Two Soundtrack CD	Nominated	
2012	Best Compilation Soundtrack for Visual Media	Season Three Soundtrack CD	Nominated	

=== Hollywood Music in Media Awards ===
Year	Category	Nominee	Result	Ref
2009	Outstanding Music Supervision	Gary Calamar	Nominated	
2009	Best Original Score – TV	Nathan Barr	Won	
2009	Best Song	"Take Me Home" (by Nathan Barr and Lisbeth Scott)	Nominated	
2010	Best Original Score – TV	Nathan Barr	Nominated	

=== Motion Picture Sound Editors ===
Year	Category	Nominee	Result	Ref
2009	Best Sound Editing – Short Form Dialogue and ADR in Television	"The Fourth Man in the Fire"	Nominated	
2010	Best Sound Editing – Short Form Dialogue and ADR in Television	"Beyond Here Lies Nothin'"	Won	

=== NAACP Image Awards ===
Year	Category	Nominee	Result	Ref
2010	Outstanding Writer in a Drama Series	Alexander Woo (for "Beyond Here Lies Nothin'")	Nominated	
2011	Outstanding Supporting Actor in a Drama Series	Nelsan Ellis	Nominated	
2011	Outstanding Writer in a Drama Series	Alexander Woo (for "It Hurts Me Too")	Nominated	

=== NewNowNext Awards ===
Year	Category	Nominee	Result	Ref
2009	Brink of Fame: Actor	Nelsan Ellis	Won	
2009	Best Show You're Not Watching		Won	
2010	Brink of Fame: Actor	Alexander Skarsgård	Nominated	
2011	'Cause You're Hot	Joe Manganiello	Won	

=== People's Choice Awards ===
Year	Category	Nominee	Result	Ref
2010	Favorite Sci-Fi/Fantasy Show		Nominated	
2010	Favorite TV Obsession		Won	
2011	Favorite Sci-Fi/Fantasy Show		Nominated	
2011	Favorite TV Obsession		Nominated	
2012	Favourite Cable TV Drama		Nominated	
2012	Favorite Sci-Fi/Fantasy Show		Nominated	
2013	Favorite Premium Cable TV show		Won	

=== Producers Guild of America Awards ===
Year	Category	Nominee	Result	Ref
2010	Norman Felton Producer of the Year Award		Nominated	
2011	Norman Felton Producer of the Year Award		Nominated	

=== Satellite Awards ===
Year	Category	Nominee	Result	Ref
2008	Best Supporting Actor – Series, Miniseries or Television Film	Nelsan Ellis	Won	
2008	Best Actress in a Series, Drama	Anna Paquin	Won	
2009	DVD Release of a TV Show	True Blood – The Complete First Season	Won	
2009	Best Television Ensemble (Special Achievement Award)		Won	
2010	Best Actress in a Series, Drama	Anna Paquin	Nominated	
2010	Best Actor in a Series, Drama	Stephen Moyer	Nominated	

=== Saturn Awards ===
Year	Category	Nominee	Result	Ref
2009	Best Syndicated/Cable TV Series		Nominated	
2009	Best Actress on Television	Anna Paquin	Nominated	
2010	Best Syndicated/Cable TV Series		Nominated	
2010	Best Actor in Television	Stephen Moyer	Nominated	
2010	Best Actress in Television	Anna Paquin	Nominated	
2010	Best Supporting Actor in Television	Alexander Skarsgård	Nominated	
2010	Best Guest Starring Role in Television	Michelle Forbes	Nominated	
2011	Best Syndicated/Cable TV Series		Nominated	
2011	Best Actor in Television	Stephen Moyer	Won	
2011	Best Actress in Television	Anna Paquin	Nominated	
2011	Best Guest Starring Role in Television	Joe Manganiello	Won (Note: Tied with Richard Dreyfuss for Weeds)	

=== Scream Awards ===
Year	Category	Nominee	Result	Ref
2009	Best TV Show		Won	
2009	Best Ensemble		Nominated	
2009	Best Horror Actor	Stephen Moyer	Won	
2009	Best Horror Actor	Ryan Kwanten	Nominated	
2009	Best Horror Actress	Anna Paquin	Won	
2009	Best Supporting Actor	Nelsan Ellis	Nominated	
2009	Best Supporting Actress	Rutina Wesley	Nominated	
2009	Best Villain	Alexander Skarsgård	Won	
2009	Breakout Performance – Male	Sam Trammell	Nominated	
2009	Best Scream Song of the Year	"Bad Things" (by Jace Everett)	Nominated	
2010	The Ultimate Scream		Nominated	
2010	Best TV Show		Won	
2010	Best Horror Actor	Stephen Moyer	Nominated	
2010	Best Horror Actor	Alexander Skarsgård	Won	
2010	Best Horror Actress	Anna Paquin	Won	
2010	Best Supporting Actor	Sam Trammell	Nominated	
2010	Best Breakout Performance – Female	Deborah Ann Woll	Nominated	
2010	Best Ensemble		Nominated	
2010	Most Memorable Mutilation	Heart Cut Out of Chest, Cut Up into Souffle and Fed to People	Nominated	
2010	Holy Sh*t! Scene of the Year	Head twisted 180 degrees during sex	Won	
2011	Best TV Show		Nominated	
2011	Best Horror Actor	Stephen Moyer	Nominated	
2011	Best Horror Actor	Alexander Skarsgård	Won	
2011	Best Horror Actress	Anna Paquin	Nominated	
2011	Best Breakout Performance – Male	Joe Manganiello	Won	
2011	Best Ensemble		Won	

=== Screen Actors Guild Awards ===
Year	Category	Nominee	Result	Ref
2010	Outstanding Performance by an Ensemble in a Drama Series		Nominated	
2011	Outstanding Performance by a Stunt Ensemble in a Television Series		Won	

=== Shorty Awards ===
Year	Category	Nominee	Result	Ref
2010	Best in Entertainment		Won	

=== Teen Choice Awards ===
Year	Category	Nominee	Result	Ref
2009	Choice Summer TV Star: Female	Anna Paquin	Nominated	
2009	Choice Summer TV Star: Male	Stephen Moyer	Nominated	
2010	Choice TV Actress: Fantasy/Sci-Fi	Anna Paquin	Nominated	
2010	Choice Summer TV Star: Female	Anna Paquin	Nominated	
2010	Choice TV Actor: Fantasy/Sci-Fi	Ryan Kwanten	Nominated	
2010	Choice Summer TV Star: Male	Stephen Moyer	Nominated	
2011	Choice TV Actress: Fantasy/Sci-Fi	Anna Paquin	Nominated	
2011	Choice Vampire	Alexander Skarsgård	Nominated	
2012	Choice TV Show Sci Fi Fantasy		Nominated	

=== TCA Awards ===
Year	Category	Nominee	Result	Ref
2009	Outstanding New Program		Won	

=== Tubey Awards ===
Year	Category	Nominee	Result	Ref
2009	Best New Show		Won	
2009	Guiltiest Pleasure Show		Won	

=== TV.com Awards ===
Year	Category	Nominee	Result	Ref
2009	Show of the Year (2009)		Won	
2010	Best Drama		Nominated	
2010	Best Serious Actor	Denis O'Hare	Nominated	
2011	Best Performance of a Non-Human Character	Alexander Skarsgård	Won	
2011	Sexiest TV Couple	Anna Paquin and Stephen Moyer	Won	

=== TV DVD Awards ===
Year	Category	Nominee	Result	Ref
2009	Best Current Series	Season One	Nominated	

=== Writers Guild of America Awards ===
Year	Category	Nominee	Result	Ref
2009	Best Screenplay - New Series	Alan Ball, Brian Buckner, Raelle Tucker, Alexander Woo, Nancy Oliver & Chris Offutt	Nominated	
2010	Best Writing for Drama Series - Episodic	Nancy Oliver (for "I Will Rise Up")	Nominated	
