= It's All Good (Bob Dylan song) =

2009 song by Bob Dylan

Song by Bob Dylan

from the album Together Through Life
- Released: April 28, 2009
- Recorded: December 2008
- Studio: Groove Masters
- Genre: Folk rock; blues rock
- Length: 5:28
- Label: Columbia Records
- Songwriters: Bob Dylan; Robert Hunter
- Producer: Jack Frost (Bob Dylan)

"It's All Good'" is a blues song written by American singer-songwriter Bob Dylan (with Grateful Dead lyricist Robert Hunter) that appears as the 10th and final track on Dylan's 2009 studio album Together Through Life. Like much of Dylan's 21st century output, he produced the song himself using the pseudonym Jack Frost.

== Composition and recording ==
"It's All Good" is a fast-tempo, accordion-driven blues in which the title is meant ironically, as the lyrics catalog various social ills. When asked by journalist Bill Flanagan how the song got started, Dylan responded, "Probably from hearing the phrase one too many times". In their book Bob Dylan All the Songs: The Story Behind Every Track, authors Philippe Margotin and Jean-Michel Guesdon call it a "compelling" song that is "reminiscent of Muddy Waters", and praise Mike Campbell's "superb guitar part". The song is performed in the key of G major

== Reception ==
The catchphrase "It's all good" was in vogue in the 2000s as a means of saying, "Don't worry about it". It was often said in response to an apology and was especially common in hip-hop culture. Music journalist Rob Sheffield, writing in Rolling Stone, which placed the song 21st on a list of "The 25 Best Bob Dylan Songs of the 21st Century", discussed the song in relation to rap music, noting that Dylan was "always a hip-hop head — ever since he spat bars on old-school rap legend Kurtis Blow’s 'Street Rock' in the Eighties", and sees Dylan's song as "[flipping] the rap catchphrase into an accordion blues rant, for a tone that’s somewhere between 'Gangsta Gangsta' and 'The Groom's Still Waiting at the Altar'”.

Corey DuBrowa, in an 8.1/10 Paste Magazine review of Together Through Life, called it a "sneering, sarcastic jump-blues...in which Dylan's ravaged voice attacks the clichéd phrase as if it represented every banker, politician and Ponzi-scheme cheat he could conjure", and sees it as emblematic of an album that is "more resolutely focused on the treacherous horizon ever before and "decries the mess we're in".

Stephen Thomas Erlewine at AllMusic referred to it as a "mordantly funny rocker", noting how Dylan's use of the contemporary catchphrase was proof 'there's no avoidance of the present" on an album where "the music is proudly, almost defiantly, rooted in the past".

A 2021 WhatCulture article ranking all of Dylan's LPs (where Together Through Life placed 19th out of 39), noted that "The album reaches its apex with the sneery 'It's All Good'...It's a great, underrated gem, in need of a re-appraisal".

Singer/songwriter Elliott Murphy cited it as one of Dylan's top 10 songs of the 21st century in an article for Poetic Justice Magazine.

== Cultural references ==
The unusual opening line of the final verse ("I’ll pluck off your beard and blow it in your face") is a reference to William Shakespeare's Hamlet. In Act II, Scene 2, Hamlet's soliloquy includes the lines, ""Who calls me villain? breaks my pate across? Plucks off my beard and blows it in my face?"

== In popular culture ==
Olivier Dahan used the song to score a car-chase sequence in his 2010 Renée Zellweger-starring film My Own Love Song.

== Live performances ==
Dylan has played the song live just three times on the Never Ending Tour. All of the performances occurred on his tour of North America in the fall of 2009: The live debut occurred at the Aragon Ballroom in Chicago, Illinois on October 31, 2009 and the last performance took place at the United Palace Theater in New York, New York on November 18, 2009.
