= Beyond Here Lies Nothin' (True Blood) =

- True Blood episode
- Maryann meets her god
- Episode no.: Season 2 Episode 12
- Directed by: Michael Cuesta
- Written by: Alexander Woo
- Original air date: September 13, 2009

Guest appearances
- Evan Rachel Wood as Queen Sophie Anne; Dale Raoul as Maxine Fortenberry; Lindsey Haun as Hadley; John Billingsley as Mike Spencer; Alec Gray as Coby Fowler; Laurel Weber as Lisa Fowler; Patricia Bethune as Jane Bodehouse; Lauren Pritchard as Coralee

Episode chronology
← Previous "Frenzy"	Next → "Bad Blood"
- True Blood (season 2)

"Beyond Here Lies Nothin'" is the 12th and final episode of the second season of True Blood and the show's 24th overall. The episode, which was written by Alexander Woo and directed by Michael Cuesta, originally aired in the United States on HBO on September 13, 2009. Like the first-season finale, the episode is divided almost in half structurally; the first half focusing heavily on Maryann and her attempts to bring new life to the god Dionysus by sacrificing Sam Merlotte in a strange ritual, while the second half deals with the aftermath of those events and how Maryann's presence in Bon Temps has affected their lives. The episode received generally positive reviews and received an Emmy nomination.

== Plot ==
Maryann appoints Sookie as the "Maid of Honor" at her sacrificial ritual, much to Sookie's disgust. Maryann asks Sookie to repeat her "electric" touch, but Sookie fails to do so. She is restrained by an entranced Lafayette. Jason and Andy Bellefleur try to advance on the crowd with an arsenal of weaponry, only to become quickly entranced themselves. Meanwhile, Eric meets Sophie Anne who has heard through her guards that Bill knows that Eric is having Lafayette deal Vampire blood. It is revealed that Sophie Anne is the one who ordered Eric to have Lafayette start dealing again. Eric assures her that Bill is not aware of the connection between them and promises to take care of him.

Bill finds Sam at Merlotte's and orders him to come with him to see Maryann. Bill offers Sam to Maryann in exchange for Sookie's safety. Sookie strongly objects to this, but Bill asks her to trust him. Eggs stabs Sam and offers some of his blood to Maryann, who rubs the blood on her body. Sam has not died, however, and tells Sookie to destroy all of Maryann's ritual offerings, which Sookie does by using her powers to push to the ground the large tree-like totem. This angers Maryann who chases Sookie with her poisonous claws, but she is stopped by the appearance of a large white bull who she believes to be the God Who Comes. Offering herself to the "God", the bull stabs her in the chest with its horns, and as Maryann starts to die, the bull transforms back to Sam, who finishes the job by removing Maryann's black heart. Bill reveals to Sookie that he allowed Sam to drink his blood so he could recover after being stabbed. Bill also thanks Sam for his trust and for helping save the town of Bon Temps. Bill comforts a visibly disturbed Sookie.

The next day, Hoyt learns that his mother was not lying about his dad having committed suicide. Deeply disturbed by this, he walks out on her again to go find Jessica. When he arrives at Bill's house, nobody is there. Jessica, after telling Bill she is going to apologize to Hoyt, instead goes to a gas station and feeds on an unsuspecting truck driver.

Sam goes to visit his adoptive parents. His adoptive mother cries and still can't accept that Sam is a shapeshifter, while his adoptive father, who's bedridden and appears deathly ill from an unknown terminal illness, writes a response to Sam's request; to know who his real parents were, despite his step mother's warnings that they were bad people.

Back in Bon Temps, Eggs is deeply disturbed by the recent happenings and begs Sookie to help him uncover his actions during his blackouts. With her help he learns that he was the one who murdered Miss Jeanette, Daphne and also the one who stabbed Sam. Incredibly distraught over the things he'd done with Maryann, he holds Andy Bellefleur at knife-point begging to be arrested. Andy tries to explain that all of his actions were not of his own free will, but Jason, seeing the hold-up from afar, does not realize what is happening and shoots Eggs. Jason is afraid after realizing he killed Eggs, but Andy takes his gun, wipes it off and tells Jason to leave and that "he was not here and he didn't see anything." Tara arrives along with many others to see Eggs shot and dead, and she breaks down in tears.

Bill takes Sookie out to a French restaurant and proposes to her. Sookie is initially confused and afraid because of all of the recent happenings in her life. She takes a moment to retreat to the ladies room to recompose herself and decides that she does want to marry Bill. However, when she returns, Bill is gone and the place has been ransacked. Bill is captured with a silver chain and kidnapped by an unknown character.

== Title reference ==
The title is taken from the song of the same name, which was written and recorded by Bob Dylan for his 2009 studio album Together Through Life. In the episode, the song is used over the end credits. The song was also used in several promos for the second season. The original title for the episode was Before the Night Is Over, which is the name of a Jerry Lee Lewis & B. B. King song playing during the scene when Sookie and Bill share a dance in the French restaurant.

The title is similar to an ancient warning to sailors: Non Plus Ultra, ("Nothing Further Beyond"). which was said to have been inscribed on the Pillars of Hercules to warn sailors against exiting the Mediterranean Sea into the Atlantic Ocean and towards the edge of the world.

== Cast ==
The episode marked the final appearance of Michelle Forbes and Mehcad Brooks. Charlaine Harris has a cameo in this episode as a patron at Merlotte's.

== Production ==
"Beyond Here Lies Nothin'" was the fifth episode of the series to be written by Alexander Woo and the first to be directed by Michael Cuesta, who had previously directed numerous episodes of Alan Ball's other HBO series Six Feet Under, including that show's penultimate episode. Charlaine Harris, author of the series of books upon which True Blood is based, makes a cameo appearance as a Merlotte's patron in the second half of the episode.

Ball said of the finale, "...the first part of the season we had a lot of different storylines taking place in different places and then we wanted to bring them all together ... where everyone was fighting the same fight for the last episode." He also commented on the scene in which Jessica feeds on a truck driver, "She's still a fairly freshly-made vampire. Bill hasn't been much of a maker and she just had a really emotional experience with Hoyt walking out on her. It's part of her instincts as a vampire and her need to feed ... she's just got rage."

== Reception ==
=== Critical response ===
Michelle Zoromski of IGN awarded the episode 8.8 out of 10 and felt the "second half of the episode wasn't interesting, but it felt like a bunch of random scenes clunkily thrown together", however she did praise the way the episode "set up some interesting plotlines for next season". Ken Tucker of Entertainment Weekly praised the episode saying it "made good on most of the stories it told this season". Phil McCall from BSC Review also praised the episode, describing it as "definitely worth the wait" and praising Maryann's death scene in particular, saying it "was pure genius on the part of the writers." Matthew Gilbert of The Boston Globe thought the finale "satisfyingly tied up the season-long plots in the demented first half, and then suggested new mysteries for next season in the quieter second half. It wasn't a full-on amazing hour, but it did the trick for me."

=== Ratings ===
When originally broadcast, the finale gained a total of 5.1 million viewers, more than double the audience for the season one finale. When additional broadcasts, on-demand viewings and DVR numbers are factored in, an average of 12 million viewers saw this and other episodes in the second season.
