= Beyond Here Lies Nothin' =

2009 song by Bob Dylan

Single by Bob Dylan

from the album Together Through Life
- A-side: "Beyond Here Lies Nothin'"
- B-side: "Down Along the Cove (Live at Bonnaroo 2004)"
- Released: March 2009
- Recorded: December 2008
- Studio: Groove Masters
- Genre: Folk rock; blues rock; Southern rock
- Label: Columbia Records
- Songwriters: Bob Dylan; Robert Hunter
- Producer: Jack Frost (Bob Dylan)

Bob Dylan singles chronology
| "Dreamin' of You" (2008) | "Beyond Here Lies Nothin'" (2009) | "Must Be Santa" (2009) |

"Beyond Here Lies Nothin' " is a song written by American singer-songwriter Bob Dylan (with Grateful Dead lyricist Robert Hunter) and performed by Dylan as the opening track on his 2009 studio album Together Through Life. The title is a quote from the ancient Roman poet Ovid. The track was available as a free download on Dylan's official website from March 30 to March 31, 2009, and a photo montage set to the song premiered on Amazon on April 21. It has been anthologized on every reissue of The Essential Bob Dylan since 2010. Like much of Dylan's 21st century output, he produced the song himself using the pseudonym Jack Frost.

== Composition and recording ==
In their book Bob Dylan All the Songs: The Story Behind Every Track, authors Philippe Margotin and Jean-Michel Guesdon describe the song as one in which Dylan and co-writer Robert Hunter have "created a beautiful love story set as a film noir, with abandoned cars lining the boulevards and light from only a few stars and the moon". They note that, musically, it "sounds quite different from anything Dylan has written so far. It has the sound of the modern blues of the 1950s, the Chicago blues, enriched by David Hidalgo's accordion and Donnie Herron's trumpet". They also claim that the song bears a resemblance to Otis Rush's 1958 song "All Your Love (I Miss Loving)" with a lead guitar part that is similar to Fleetwood Mac's 1968 single "Black Magic Woman".

== Reception and legacy ==
Jon Dolan, writing in Rolling Stone, which placed the song 16th on a list of "The 25 Best Bob Dylan Songs of the 21st Century", praised its atmospheric musicianship: "With Mike Campbell’s guitar lashing against rumbling drums, and the forlorn feel of Donnie Herron’s trumpet and David Hidalgo’s accordion, the song has a mysterious noir feel".

Spectrum Culture included the song on a list of Dylan's "20 Best Songs of the '00s". In an article accompanying the list, critic Tyler Dunston noted that the lyrics seemed to be a deliberate reversal of the Ovid exile poem that gave Dylan's song its title:

While Ovid was exiled by Augustus, alone in a land far from home where no one speaks his language, Dylan is at home with 'the only love' he’s ever known. Outside of their love, they have 'nothing to call [their] own'. Both writers tell a story of alienation, but Dylan’s story is one of alienation from everything with a crucial exception. As such, it’s as much about refuge—in another person—as it is about alienation. This refuge is such that the social world melts away—beyond it there is nothing 'but the moon and stars'. The emphasis on the nothing which characterizes the world outside their love, along with qualifiers like 'As long as you stay with me' and 'For as long as love will last', highlights the significance of Ovid’s poem for this speaker. Ovid’s vision of exile is in many ways the same as the one Dylan hints at in lines like, 'Don’t know what I’d do without it/ Without this love that we call ours'. Without this love, his exile would be the same as that of the ancient poet. Dredging up 'the mountains of the past' through Ovid’s poem, Dylan conjures the fear of loss that goes hand in hand with his vision of love'.

Ultimate Classic Rock listed it as one off the "Top 10 Rock and Roll Accordion Songs" in 2013, a sentiment shared by Chaospin in 2021. Ultimate Classic Rock critic Matthew Wilkening ratedit as the 4th best song Dylan recorded between 1992 and 2011.

A 2021 Guardian article included it on a list of "80 Bob Dylan songs everyone should know".

The song peaked at #10 on Billboard's Adult Alternative Songs chart in June 2009. The following year it was nominated at the 52nd Grammy Awards for Grammy Award for Best Rock Vocal Performance, Solo.

== In popular culture ==
Screen capture from the Beyond Here Lies Nothin' music video

The song was used in the trailer for the second season of HBO's True Blood, and was again featured in the final episode of the second season of the program, "Beyond Here Lies Nothin'", which takes its title from the song.

Blue-Tongue Films created a music video for the song directed by Nash Edgerton, a filmmaker and stuntman, that features Joel Stoffer and Amanda Aardsma in an extreme marital spat. It was the first of four official music videos Edgerton would direct for Dylan and the only one in which Dylan himself did not appear. The video provoked divisive reactions upon release because of its depiction of extreme violence. As Edgerton himself noted in an interview with Pitchfork, "it seems people either really love it or really fucking hate it. There's no in between. I'm all for things getting a reaction, whether it's good or bad. Not that I set out to upset anyone, but I think some people don't get the irony in things that I make".

The song plays over the closing credits of Olivier Dahan's Renée Zellweger-starring film My Own Love Song.

== Live performances ==
Between 2009 and 2019 Dylan performed the song 460 times in concert. This makes it the most frequently performed song from Together Through Life by a considerable margin. The live debut occurred at Fifth Third Field in Dayton, Ohio on July 10, 2009 and the last performance (to date) took place at Ameris Bank Amphitheatre on June 21, 2024.
