= Together Through Life =

2009 studio album by Bob Dylan

Studio album by Bob Dylan
- Released: April 28, 2009
- Recorded: December 2008
- Studio: Groove Masters
- Genres: Folk rock; blues rock
- Length: 45:33
- Label: Columbia
- Producer: Jack Frost

Bob Dylan chronology
| The Bootleg Series Vol. 8: Tell Tale Signs: Rare and Unreleased 1989–2006 (2008) | Together Through Life (2009) | Christmas in the Heart (2009) |

Bob Dylan studio album chronology
| Modern Times (2006) | Together Through Life (2009) | Christmas in the Heart (2009) |

Singles from Together Through Life
- 1. "Beyond Here Lies Nothin'" Released: March 31, 2009

Together Through Life is the thirty-third studio album by singer-songwriter Bob Dylan, released on April 28, 2009, by Columbia Records. The release of the album, which reached number 1 in multiple countries, was unexpected and surprised fans. Dylan co-wrote most of the songs with Robert Hunter and recorded with musicians including Mike Campbell of Tom Petty and the Heartbreakers, and David Hidalgo of Los Lobos. The album was recorded at Jackson Browne's Groove Masters studio in Santa Monica, California and produced by Dylan under the pseudonym Jack Frost.

== Composition and recording ==
In a conversation with music journalist Bill Flanagan, published on Bob Dylan's official website at the time of the album's release, Dylan said that the genesis of the record came when French film director Olivier Dahan asked him to supply a song for his new road movie, My Own Love Song, which became "Life Is Hard". Indeed, according to Dylan biographer Clinton Heylin, "Dahan was keen to get a whole soundtrack's worth of songs from the man" – and "then the record sort of took its own direction".

Dylan wrote all but one of the album's songs with Grateful Dead lyricist Robert Hunter, with whom he had previously co-written two songs on his 1988 album Down in the Groove. In an interview with Rolling Stone magazine, Dylan commented on the collaboration: “Hunter is an old buddy, we could probably write a hundred songs together if we thought it was important or the right reasons were there... He's got a way with words and I do too. We both write a different type of song than what passes today for songwriting”. The only other writers Dylan has collaborated with to such a degree are Jacques Levy, with whom he wrote most of the songs on Desire in 1976, and Helena Springs, with whom he co-wrote a plethora of songs in the late 1970s (although the majority of them remain unrecorded or unreleased).

Dan Engler, writing in the Verde Independent, noted, "Bob Dylan claimed he could feel the presence of Buddy Holly while recording his landmark album Time Out of Mind in 1997. On his latest disc, Together Through Life, you get the feeling the ghost of old Dylan chum Doug Sahm was haunting the recording sessions". In their book Bob Dylan All the Songs: The Story Behind Every Track, authors Philippe Margotin and Jean-Michel Guesdon note that Sahm "embodied the long history of American popular music, from blues to Tex-Mex. It is to this history that Dylan referred when he composed Together Through Life." Dylan is backed on the album by his regular touring band plus guitarist Mike Campbell of Tom Petty and the Heartbreakers and David Hidalgo of Los Lobos (whose accordion playing on many of the album's tracks caused critics to describe it as possessing a "south of the border" feel). Dylan commented on Campbell's guitar work in his interview with Flanagan, "He's good with me. He's been playing with Tom for so long that he hears everything from a songwriter's point of view and he can play most any style".

== Release and promotion ==
News of the album first broke in a Rolling Stone article on March 4, 2009, the month before the album's release. Critic David Fricke described it as a "dark new disc with a bluesy border-town feel" and quoted a source close to Dylan's camp as saying the album "came as a surprise". A follow-up article in Rolling Stone on March 16 claimed the album contained "struggling love songs" and had little similarity to Dylan's previous album, 2006's Modern Times.

The album's opening track and lead single, "Beyond Here Lies Nothin'", was made available as a free download on Dylan's official website from March 30 to March 31, and a music video for the song, consisting of a montage of Bruce Davidson's photographs, premiered on Amazon on April 21. A second music video for the song, directed by Nash Edgerton, premiered on the website of the Independent Film Channel on May 12, 2009. Edgerton's video sparked controversy because of its depiction of extreme violence.

== Artwork ==
The album's cover features a black-and-white photograph of a young couple in the back seat of a car taken by photographer Bruce Davidson in 1959. The photo had previously been used on the cover of American author Larry Brown's short story collection Big Bad Love. The back cover photograph of a group of musicians was taken by Josef Koudelka in 1968. The inner sleeve pictures of Dylan and band in the studio were taken by Danny Clinch. The package design is credited to Coco Shinomiya.

== Sources and quotations ==
As with many of his previous albums, Dylan took words and music from a wide array of sources and incorporated them into his own songs on Together Through Life. The phrase "If you ever go to Houston, you better walk right", for example, is taken from the folk song "Midnight Special" (Dylan played harmonica on Harry Belafonte's 1962 recording of the song); and Willie Dixon's "I Just Want to Make Love to You" was the clear musical template for "My Wife's Hometown", resulting in Dixon receiving a co-writing credit on Dylan's song. In their 2009 interview, Flanagan suggested a similarity of the new record to the sound of Chess Records and Sun Records, which Dylan acknowledged as an effect of "the way the instruments were played".

== Reception ==
Professional ratings
Aggregate scores
| Source | Rating |
|---|---|
| AnyDecentMusic? | 6.9/10 |
| Metacritic | 76/100 |
Review scores
| Source | Rating |
| Allmusic | 4/5 stars |
| The A.V. Club | A− |
| Blender | 5/5 stars |
| Mojo | 4/5 stars |
| Paste | 8.1/10 |
| Pitchfork Media | 5.4/10 |
| Robert Christgau | B+ |
| Rolling Stone | 4/5 stars |
| The Times | 4/5 stars |
| Tiny Mix Tapes | 4/5 stars |
| Uncut | 5/5 stars |

Critical reception of the album was favorable. The record maintains a score of 76/100 at critic aggregator Metacritic ("Generally favorable reviews"). During the Flanagan interview, Dylan gave his own thoughts about how the record would be received: "I know my fans will like it. Other than that, I have no idea".

Rolling Stone gave the album 4 stars out of 5. Describing the album as a "murky-sounding, often perplexing record", David Fricke of Rolling Stone writes, "Dylan, who turns 68 in May, has never sounded as ravaged, pissed off and lusty". BBC noted that the album is "a masterful reading of 20th century American folk, albeit shot through with some mischievous lyrical twists" and compares it to "some Chicago urban blues tribute". According to Mojo, "Together Through Life is an album that gets its hooks in early and refuses to let go". The reviewer described it as "dark yet comforting". Uncut and Blender both gave the album 5 stars out of 5, saying that it was "unbelievably good".

Corey DuBrowa of Paste Magazine, in his 8.10/10 review, stated: "Dylan's never spent much time contemplating the rearview mirror, but Together Through Life finds him more resolutely focused on the treacherous horizon than ever before: Song after song decries the mess we're in (the sneering, sarcastic jump-blues 'It's All Good,' in which Dylan's ravaged voice attacks the clichéd phrase as if it represented every banker, politician and Ponzi-scheme cheat he could conjure; 'My Wife's Home Town,' a bluesy jaunt that surveys the current economic wreckage as if from the passenger-side window of a car up on blocks) without forsaking the idea that love—and the comfort we find in shared misery—is essentially all we have left when a lifetime of ambition and achievement are swept away by the winds of change. You'd have to go all the way back to 1974’s Planet Waves—which Dylan summarized as 'cast-iron songs & torch ballads'—to find a record on which he sounds so simultaneously anxious and enervated. Indeed, when Dylan croaks in 'I Feel a Change Comin’ On,' '[I’ve] got the blood of the land in my voice,' you can hear quite plainly the sadness, disappointment and exhaustion of which he sings".

The album received two Grammy Award nominations in 2010: "Best Americana Album" and "Best Solo Rock Vocal Performance" for "Beyond Here Lies Nothin'".

== Versions ==
The album is available as a one-CD version containing only the new material that Dylan recorded, or as a 3-disc deluxe version including the album itself, the "Friends & Neighbors" episode of Theme Time Radio Hour and a DVD featuring an interview with Dylan's first manager Roy Silver (recorded for the Martin Scorsese documentary No Direction Home, but unused).

There is also a two-LP deluxe vinyl version, containing the same songs as the CD. In the US, the CD is included as part of the vinyl package.

== Track listing ==
All lyrics are written by Bob Dylan and Robert Hunter, except where noted; all music is composed by Dylan, except where noted.

Together Through Life track listing
| No. | Title | Length |
|---|---|---|
| 1. | "Beyond Here Lies Nothin'" | 3:51 |
| 2. | "Life Is Hard" | 3:39 |
| 3. | "My Wife's Home Town" (music: Dylan, Willie Dixon) | 4:15 |
| 4. | "If You Ever Go to Houston" | 5:49 |
| 5. | "Forgetful Heart" | 3:42 |
| 6. | "Jolene" | 3:51 |
| 7. | "This Dream of You" (lyrics: Dylan) | 5:54 |
| 8. | "Shake Shake Mama" | 3:37 |
| 9. | "I Feel a Change Comin' On" | 5:25 |
| 10. | "It's All Good" | 5:28 |

=== Deluxe Edition ===
Disc one
| No. | Title | Length |

Disc two – Theme Time Radio Hour: Friends & Neighbors
| No. | Title | Writer(s) | Length |
|---|---|---|---|
| 1. | "Howdy Neighbor" (Porter Wagoner & The Wagonmasters) | J. Morris |
| 2. | "Don't Take Everybody to Be Your Friend" (Sister Rosetta Tharpe) | Milt Gabler, Rosetta Tharpe |
| 3. | "Diamonds Are a Girl's Best Friend" (T-Bone Burnett) | Leo Robin, Jule Styne |
| 4. | "La Valse de Amitie" (Doc Guidry) | Oran Guidry |
| 5. | "Make Friends" (Moon Mullican) | E. Mcgraw |
| 6. | "My Next Door Neighbor" (Jerry McCain) | Jerry McCain |
| 7. | "Let's Invite Them Over" (George Jones & Melba Montgomery) | Onie Wheeler |
| 8. | "My Friends" (Howlin' Wolf) | Chester Burnett, S. Ling |
| 9. | "Last Night" (Little Walter) | W. Jones |
| 10. | "You've Got a Friend" (Carole King) | Carole King |
| 11. | "Bad Neighborhood" (Ronnie & The Delinquents) | Caronna, Mac Rebennack |
| 12. | "Neighbours" (The Rolling Stones) | Mick Jagger, Keith Richards |
| 13. | "Too Many Parties and Too Many Pals" (Hank Williams) | B. Rose, M. Dixon, R. Henderson |
| 14. | "Why Can't We Be Friends" (War) | S. Allen, H. Brown, M. Dickerson, J. Goldstein, L. Jordan, C. Miller, H. Scott, L. Oskar |

Disc three
| No. | Title | Length |
|---|---|---|
| 1. | "Roy Silver – The Lost Interview (DVD)" |

Note: When pre-ordered from iTunes, consumers also got a bonus track of a studio rehearsal of "Lay Lady Lay" recorded in 1969.

== Personnel ==
- Bob Dylan – guitar, keyboards, vocals, production
- Robert Hunter – lyricist

Additional musicians

- Mike Campbell – guitar, mandolin
- Tony Garnier – bass guitar, upright bass
- Donnie Herron – steel guitar, banjo, mandolin, trumpet
- David Hidalgo – accordion, guitar
- George Receli – drums

Technical personnel

- David Bianco – recording, mixing
- Eddy Schreyer – mastering
- Bill Lane – assistant engineering
- Rafael Serrano – engineering
- David Spreng – engineering
- Rich Tosti – assistant engineering

== Charts ==
The album debuted at number 1 in several countries, including the U.S. and the UK. It was Dylan's first chart-topping album in Britain since New Morning in 1970. The album debuted at number 1 on the Billboard 200, selling 125,000 copies in its first week of release. It then reached number 1 on the Top Internet Album, Top Digital Album, Tastemaker, Top Rock Album, and Most Comprehensive Album listings. In the U.S. the album has sold more than 300,000 copies by August 2009.

=== Weekly charts ===
| Chart (2009) | Peak position |
|---|---|
| Australian Albums (ARIA) | 5 |
| Austrian Albums (Ö3 Austria) | 1 |
| Belgian Albums (Ultratop Flanders) | 3 |
| Belgian Albums (Ultratop Wallonia) | 13 |
| Canadian Albums (Billboard) | 1 |
| Danish Albums (Hitlisten) | 1 |
| Dutch Albums (Album Top 100) | 3 |
| Finnish Albums (Suomen virallinen lista) | 6 |
| French Albums (SNEP) | 9 |
| German Albums (Offizielle Top 100) | 2 |
| Hungarian Albums (MAHASZ) | 39 |
| Irish Albums (IRMA) | 2 |
| Italian Albums (FIMI) | 6 |
| New Zealand Albums (RMNZ) | 3 |
| Norwegian Albums (VG-lista) | 2 |
| Portuguese Albums (AFP) | 20 |
| Scottish Albums (Official Charts) | 1 |
| Spanish Albums (Promusicae) | 4 |
| Swedish Albums (Sverigetopplistan) | 1 |
| Swiss Albums (Schweizer Hitparade) | 2 |
| UK Albums (Official Charts) | 1 |
| US Billboard 200 | 1 |
| US Top Rock Albums (Billboard) | 1 |

=== Year-end charts ===
| Chart (2009) | Position |
|---|---|
| Belgian Albums (Ultratop Flanders) | 64 |
| Dutch Albums (Album Top 100) | 75 |
| French Albums (SNEP) | 175 |
| German Albums (Offizielle Top 100) | 72 |
| Swedish Albums (Sverigetopplistan) | 47 |
| UK Albums (OCC) | 126 |
| US Billboard 200 | 106 |
| US Top Rock Albums (Billboard) | 28 |

== Certifications and sales ==
| Region | Certification | Certified units/sales |
|---|---|---|
| Ireland (IRMA) | Gold | 7,500^{^} |
| United Kingdom (BPI) | Gold | 100,000^{^} |
| United States | — | 358,000 |
Summaries
| Worldwide | —N/a | 1,000,000 |
^{^} Shipments figures based on certification alone.
