= The Bob Dylan Archive =

The Bob Dylan Archive is a collection of rare documents and objects relating to notable American singer-songwriter Bob Dylan, stored in a 29,000 square feet facility in Oklahoma. The archive consists of two floors full of galleries showcasing a majority of Bob Dylan items that have never been publicly available.

== Collection ==
The Archive holds over 100,000 items (6,000 according to another source), including drafts and session tapes of songs that allow one to trace the evolution of the song in detail. Other items include many Dylan notebooks, photographs, business documents, unreleased concert films, unpublished works and many other types of items, including the leather jacket Dylan wore at the 1965 Newport Folk Festival. Most but not all items are associated with Dylan's career and life in the 1960s. The material will now be made available for research and will form the basis of public exhibitions.

As of March 16, 2016, nearly 1,000 items from the Archive had been brought to the Hardesty Archival Center inside the Helmerich Center, to be preserved and digitally recorded. The remainder of the archive has been brought to Tulsa from various locations over the past few years.

== Acquisition ==
On March 2, 2016, it was announced that the archive had been acquired by the George Kaiser Family Foundation (GKFF) and The University of Tulsa (TU). It will be under the care of the university's Helmerich Center for American Research. The archive is located next to the Woody Guthrie Center Archives, which were purchased earlier by the GKFF and are already housed in Tulsa.

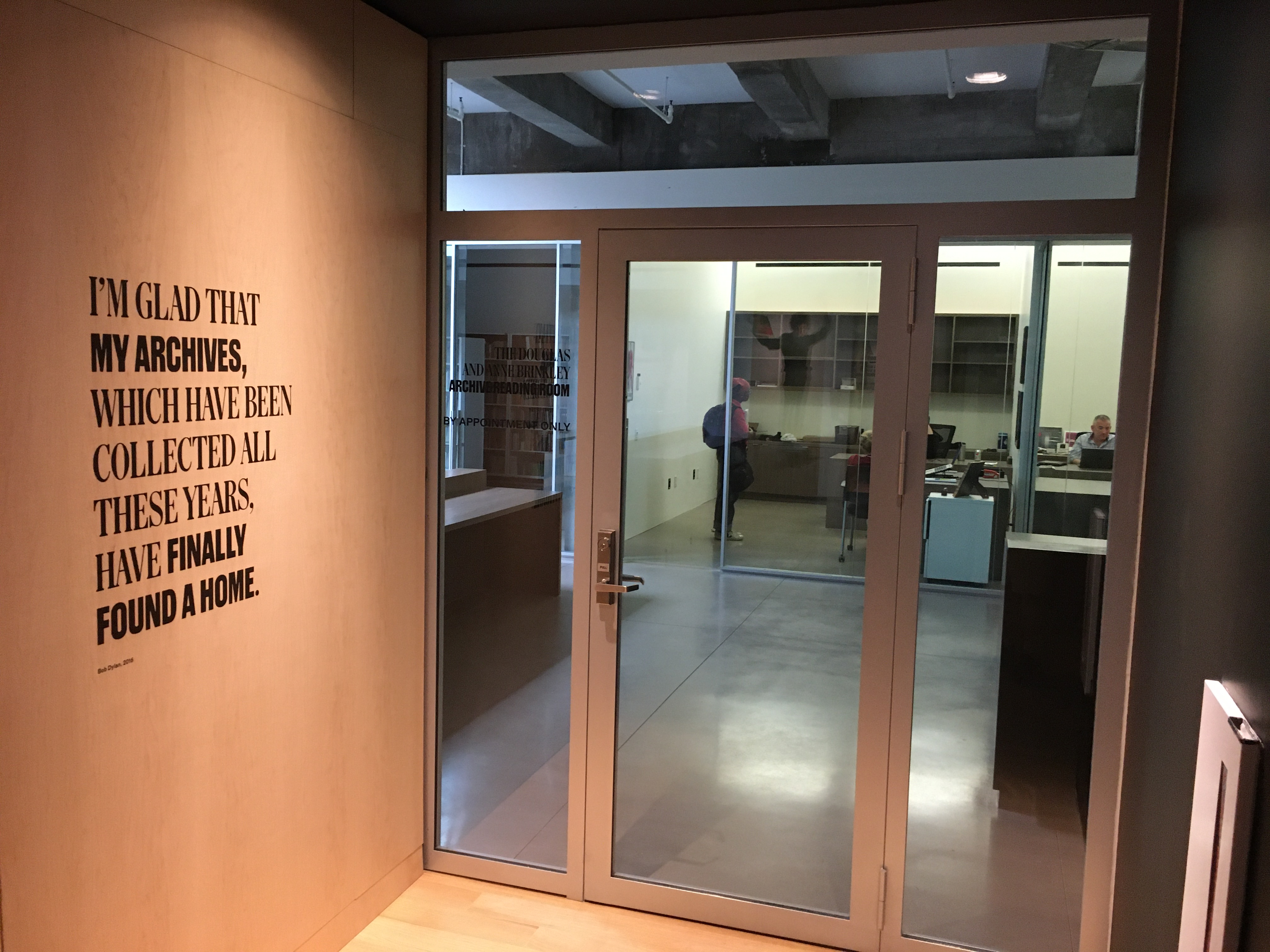
Bob Dylan Center Archives, image from Jonathan Schillings, CC BY-SA 4.0

Along with Guthrie acquisition, the Dylan archive hopes to make the city a central location to conduct research on popular music and encourage artistic activities. (Woody Guthrie had significant influence on and served as an inspiration for Bob Dylan himself.)

Some commenters were surprised that the Dylan Archives were to be housed in Tulsa, but Dylan explained that he finds comfort in the "casual hum of the heartland" that Tulsa represents in his mind. Dylan is quoted stating, "I'm glad that my archives, which have been collected all these years, have finally found a home and are to be included with the works of Woody Guthrie and especially alongside all the valuable artifacts from the Native American Nations. To me, it makes a lot of sense, and it's a great honor."

== See also ==
- Bob Dylan discography
- Bob Dylan Nobel Prize
- Bob Dylan's recording sessions
- Woody Guthrie Center
