= Bob Dylan's recording sessions =

Bob Dylan is an American musician, singer-songwriter, music producer, artist, and writer. He has been an influential figure in popular music and culture for more than five decades. Much of his most celebrated work dates from the 1960s when he was an informal chronicler and a seemingly reluctant figurehead of social unrest.

All songs written by Bob Dylan, except where noted.

== 1959–1960 ==
=== Minnesota home recordings, part 1 ===
==== May 1959 ====
- Home of Ric Kangas, Hibbing, Minnesota (time unknown)
  - "When I Got Troubles" - Home recording released on The Bootleg Series Vol. 7: No Direction Home: The Soundtrack

==== September 1960 ====
- Home of Bob Dylan, Minneapolis, Minnesota (time unknown)
  - "Rambler, Gambler" (Traditional) – Home recording released on The Bootleg Series Vol. 7: No Direction Home: The Soundtrack

== 1961 ==
=== Carnegie Chapter Hall concert ===
==== November 4, 1961 ====
- Carnegie Chapter Hall, New York City (time unknown)
  - "This Land Is Your Land" (Woody Guthrie) – Live recording released on The Bootleg Series Vol. 7: No Direction Home: The Soundtrack

=== Bob Dylan sessions ===
==== November 20, 1961 ====
- Studio A, Columbia Recording Studios, New York City (7.00pm-10.00 pm)
  - "You're No Good" (Jesse Fuller) [Takes 1–8] – Take 5 released on Bob Dylan
  - "Fixin' to Die" (Bukka White) [Takes 1–3] – Take 3 released on Bob Dylan
  - "He Was a Friend of Mine" (Traditional) [Takes 1–2] – Take 2 released on The Bootleg Series Volumes 1-3 (Rare & Unreleased) 1961-1991
  - "House of the Risin' Sun" (Traditional) [Takes 1–3] – Take 3 released on Bob Dylan
  - "Talkin' New York" [Takes 1–2] – Take 2 released on Bob Dylan
  - "Song to Woody" [Takes 1–2] – Take 2 released on Bob Dylan
  - "Baby, Let Me Follow You Down" (Traditional) [Take 1] – Take 1 released on Bob Dylan
  - "Man of Constant Sorrow" (Traditional) [Take 1]
  - "In My Time of Dyin'" (Traditional) [Take 1] – Take 1 released on Bob Dylan

==== November 22, 1961 ====
- Studio A, Columbia Recording Studios, New York City (2.30pm-5.30 pm)
  - "Man on the Street" [Takes 1–4, 6] – Take 2 released on The Bootleg Series Volumes 1–3 (Rare & Unreleased) 1961–1991; included on The Bootleg Series Vol. 9 – The Witmark Demos: 1962–1964
  - "(As I Go) Ramblin' Round" (Woody Guthrie) [Takes 1–2]
  - "Man of Constant Sorrow" [Remake] [Takes 1–3] – Take 3 released on Bob Dylan
  - "Pretty Peggy-O" (Traditional) [Takes 1–2] – Take 2 released on Bob Dylan
  - "See That My Grave Is Kept Clean" (Blind Lemon Jefferson) [Takes 1–4] – Take 2 released on Bob Dylan
  - "Gospel Plow" (Traditional) [Take 1] – Take 1 released on Bob Dylan
  - "Highway 51" (Curtis Jones) [Take 1] – Take 1 released on Bob Dylan
  - "Freight Train Blues" (Traditional) [Take 1] – Take 1 released on Bob Dylan
  - "House Carpenter" (Traditional) [Take 1] – Take 1 released on The Bootleg Series Volumes 1–3 (Rare & Unreleased) 1961–1991

=== Minnesota home recordings, part 2 ===
==== December 22 ====
- Home of Bonnie Beecher, Minneapolis, Minnesota (time unknown)
  - "Hard Times in New York Town" - Home recording released on The Bootleg Series Volumes 1–3 (Rare & Unreleased) 1961–1991
  - "Dink's Song (Traditional) – Home recording released on The Bootleg Series Vol. 7: No Direction Home: The Soundtrack
  - "I Was Young When I Left Home" - Home recording released on Love and Theft (limited edition); included on The Bootleg Series Vol. 7: No Direction Home: The Soundtrack

== 1962 ==
=== New York home recordings, part 1 ===
==== January 29, 1962 ====
- Home of Eve and Mac MacKenzie, New York City (time unknown)
  - "Hard Times in New York Town" - Home recording released on The 50th Anniversary Collection
  - "The Death of Emmett Till" - Home recording released on The 50th Anniversary Collection

=== Leeds demo recordings ===
==== February 1962 ====
- Leeds Music Demos, New York City (time unknown)
  - "Hard Times in New York Town" - Demo recording released on The Bootleg Series Vol. 9 – The Witmark Demos: 1962–1964
  - "Poor Boy Blues" – Demo recording released on The Bootleg Series Vol. 9 – The Witmark Demos: 1962–1964
  - "Ballad for a Friend" – Demo recording released on The Bootleg Series Vol. 9 – The Witmark Demos: 1962–1964
  - "Rambling, Gambling Willie" – Demo recording released on The Bootleg Series Vol. 9 – The Witmark Demos: 1962–1964
  - "Talkin' Bear Mountain Picnic Massacre Blues" – Demo recording released on The Bootleg Series Vol. 9 – The Witmark Demos: 1962–1964
  - "Standing on the Highway" – Demo recording released on The Bootleg Series Vol. 9 – The Witmark Demos: 1962–1964

=== Gerde's Folk City concert ===
==== April 16, 1962 ====
- Gerde's Folk City, New York City (time unknown)
  - "Honey, Just Allow Me One More Chance" (Dylan/Henry Thomas) – Live recording released on The 50th Anniversary Collection
  - "Talkin' New York" - Live recording released on The 50th Anniversary Collection
  - "Corrina, Corrina" (Traditional) – Live recording released on The 50th Anniversary Collection
  - "Deep Ellem Blues" (Traditional) – Live recording released on The 50th Anniversary Collection
  - "Blowin' in the Wind" - Live recording released on The 50th Anniversary Collection

=== The Freewheelin' Bob Dylan sessions, part 1 ===
==== April 24, 1962 ====
- Studio A, Columbia Recording Studios, New York City (2.30pm-5.30 pm)
  - "Going to New Orleans" (Traditional) [Takes 1–2] – Takes 1 and 2 released on The 50th Anniversary Collection
  - "Sally Gal" [Takes 1–3]
    - Take 1 – Released on The Bootleg Series Vol. 7: No Direction Home: The Soundtrack
    - Takes 2 and 3 – Released on The 50th Anniversary Collection
  - "Rambling Gambling Willie" [Takes 1–4]
    - Takes 1 and 3 – Released on The 50th Anniversary Collection
    - Take 4 – Released on The Bootleg Series Volumes 1-3 (Rare & Unreleased) 1961-1991
  - "Corrina, Corrina" (Traditional) [Takes 1–2] – Takes 1 and 2 released on The 50th Anniversary Collection
  - "The Death of Emmett Till" [Take 1] – Take 1 released on The 50th Anniversary Collection
  - "Talkin' John Birch Paranoid Blues" [Takes 1–3]
  - "(I Heard That) Lonesome Whistle" (Hank Williams/Jimmie Davis) [Takes 1–2] – Take 2 released on The 50th Anniversary Collection

==== April 25, 1962 ====
- Studio A, Columbia Recording Studios, New York City (2.30pm-5.30 pm)
  - "Rocks and Gravel" [Takes 1–3] – Take 3 released on The 50th Anniversary Collection
  - "Let Me Die in My Footsteps" [Take 1] – Take 1 released on The Bootleg Series Volumes 1–3 (Rare & Unreleased) 1961–1991
  - "Talkin' Havah Negeilah Blues" [Take 1] – Take 1 released on The Bootleg Series Volumes 1–3 (Rare & Unreleased) 1961–1991
  - "Sally Gal" [Takes 4–5] – Takes 4 and 5 released on The 50th Anniversary Collection
  - "Baby, Please Don't Go" (Big Joe Williams) [Takes 1–3] – Takes 1 and 3 – released on The 50th Anniversary Collection
  - "Milk Cow's (Calf's) Blues (Good Morning Blues)" (Robert Johnson) [Takes 1–3] – Takes 1 and 3 – released on The 50th Anniversary Collection
  - "Wichita (Going to Louisiana)" (Traditional) [Take 1 and Take unnumbered]
    - Take 1 – Released on The 50th Anniversary Collection
    - An "unnumbered take" released on The 50th Anniversary Collection is a duplicate of Take 2
  - "Talkin' Bear Mountain Picnic Massacre Blues" [Takes 1–3]
    - Take 3 – Released on The Bootleg Series Volumes 1–3 (Rare & Unreleased) 1961–1991
  - "Milk Cow's (Calf's) Blues (Good Morning Blues)" (Johnson) [Take 4] – Take 4 released on The 50th Anniversary Collection
  - "Wichita (Going to Louisiana)" (Traditional) [Take 2] – Take 2 released on The 50th Anniversary Collection

=== Broadside Show, recorded for WBAI-FM ===
==== May 1962 ====
- WBAI Studios, New York City (time unknown)
- Recorded under the alias Blind Boy Grunt.
  - "The Ballad of Donald White" – Recording released on Broadside Ballads, Volume 6: Broadside Reunion
  - "The Ballad of Emmett Till" – Recording released on Broadside Ballads, Volume 6: Broadside Reunion
  - "Blowin' in the Wind" – Recording unreleased

=== Witmark demo recordings, part 1 ===
==== July 1962 ====
- Witmark Studio, New York City (time unknown)
  - "Blowin' in the Wind" – Demo recording released on The Bootleg Series Vol. 9 – The Witmark Demos: 1962–1964

=== Finjan Club concert ===
==== July 2, 1962 ====
- Finjan Club, Montreal, Quebec (time unknown)
  - "The Death of Emmett Till" – Live recording released on The 50th Anniversary Collection
  - "Stealin'" (Traditional) – Live recording released on The 50th Anniversary Collection
  - "Hiram Hubbard" (Traditional) – Live recording released on The 50th Anniversary Collection
  - "Blowin' in the Wind" – Live recording released on The 50th Anniversary Collection
  - "Rocks and Gravel" – Live recording released on The 50th Anniversary Collection
  - "Quit Your Low Down Ways" – Live recording released on The 50th Anniversary Collection
  - "He Was a Friend of Mine" – Live recording released on The 50th Anniversary Collection
  - "Let Me Die in My Footsteps" – Live recording released on The 50th Anniversary Collection
  - "Two Trains Runnin'" (McKinley Morganfield) – Live recording released on The 50th Anniversary Collection
  - "Ramblin' on My Mind" (Johnson) – Live recording released on The 50th Anniversary Collection
  - "Blue Yodel No. 8 (Muleskinner Blues)" (Jimmie Rodgers) – Live recording released on The 50th Anniversary Collection
  - "Blue Yodel No. 8 (Muleskinner Blues), Part 2" (Rodgers) – Live recording released on The 50th Anniversary Collection

=== The Freewheelin' Bob Dylan sessions, part 2 ===
==== July 9, 1962 ====
- Studio A, Columbia Recording Studios, New York City (2.30pm-5.30 pm)
  - "Baby, I'm in the Mood for You" [Takes 1–3]
    - Take 2 – Released on The 50th Anniversary Collection
    - Take 3 – Released on Biograph
  - "Bob Dylan's Blues" [Take 1] – Take 1 released on The Freewheelin' Bob Dylan
  - "Blowin' in the Wind" [Takes 1–3]
    - Takes 1 and 2 – Released on The 50th Anniversary Collection
    - Take 3 – Released on The Freewheelin' Bob Dylan
  - "Quit Your Lowdown Ways" [Take 1] – Take 1 released on The Bootleg Series Volumes 1–3 (Rare & Unreleased) 1961–1991
  - "Honey, Just Allow Me One More Chance" (Dylan/Thomas) [Take 1] – Take 3 released on The Freewheelin' Bob Dylan
  - "Down the Highway" [Take 1] – Take 1 released on The Freewheelin' Bob Dylan
  - "Worried Blues" (Traditional) [Takes 1–2]
    - Take 1 – Released on The 50th Anniversary Collection
    - Take 2 – Released on The Bootleg Series Volumes 1–3 (Rare & Unreleased) 1961–1991
  - "Baby, I'm in the Mood for You" [Take 4] – Take 4 released on The 50th Anniversary Collection
  - "Bob Dylan's Blues" [Takes 2–3] – Takes 2 and 3 released on The 50th Anniversary Collection

=== Carnegie Hall concert ===
==== September 22, 1962 ====
- Carnegie Hall, New York City (time unknown)
  - "Sally Gal" – Live recording released on The 50th Anniversary Collection
  - "Highway 51" (Curtis Jones) – Live recording released on The 50th Anniversary Collection
  - "Talkin' John Birch Paranoid Blues" – Live recording released on The 50th Anniversary Collection
  - "Ballad of Hollis Brown" – Live recording released on The 50th Anniversary Collection
  - "A Hard Rain's a-Gonna Fall" – Live recording released on The 50th Anniversary Collection

=== New York home recordings, part 2 ===
==== September 1962 ====
- Home of Eve and Mac MacKenzie, New York City (time unknown)
  - "See That My Grave Is Kept Clean" (Blind Lemon Jefferson) – Live recording released on The 50th Anniversary Collection
  - "Ballad of Donald White" – Live recording released on The 50th Anniversary Collection

=== Gaslight Cafe concert ===
==== October 15, 1962 ====
- Gaslight Cafe, New York City (time unknown)
  - "Barbara Allen" (Traditional) – Live recording released on Live at The Gaslight 1962
  - "A Hard Rain's a-Gonna Fall" – Live recording released on Live at The Gaslight 1962
  - "Don't Think Twice, It's All Right" – Live recording released on Live at The Gaslight 1962
  - "Black Cross" (Lord Buckley) – Live recording released on The 50th Anniversary Collection
  - "No More Auction Block" (Traditional) – Live recording released on The Bootleg Series Volumes 1-3 (Rare & Unreleased) 1961–1991; included on The 50th Anniversary Collection
  - "Rocks and Gravel" – Live recording released on Live at The Gaslight 1962
  - "Moonshiner" (Traditional) – Live recording released on Live at The Gaslight 1962
  - "John Brown" – Live recording released on Live at The Gaslight 1962
  - "Ballad of Hollis Brown" – Live recording released on The 50th Anniversary Collection
  - "See That My Grave Is Kept Clean" (Jefferson) – Live recording released on The 50th Anniversary Collection
  - "Cocaine" (Traditional) – Live recording released on Live at The Gaslight 1962
  - "The Cuckoo (Is a Pretty Bird)" (Traditional) – Live recording released on Live at The Gaslight 1962
  - "Ain't No More Cane" (Huddie "Lead Belly" Ledbetter) – Live recording released on The 50th Anniversary Collection
  - "Motherless Child" (Traditional) – Live recording released on The 50th Anniversary Collection
  - "Handsome Molly" (Traditional) – Live recording released on Live at The Gaslight 1962
  - "Kind Hearted Woman Blues" (Robert Johnson) – Live recording released on The 50th Anniversary Collection
  - "West Texas" (Traditional) – Live recording released on Live at The Gaslight 1962

=== The Freewheelin' Bob Dylan sessions, part 3 ===
==== October 26, 1962 ====
- Studio A, Columbia Recording Studios, New York City (2.30pm-5.30 pm)
  - "Corrina, Corrina" (Traditional) [Remake] [Takes 1–6] – Takes 2 and 3 released on The 50th Anniversary Collection
  - "Mixed-Up Confusion" [Takes 1–2]
  - "That's All Right (Mama)" (Arthur Crudup) [Takes 1–5] – Takes 1, 3 and 5 released on The 50th Anniversary Collection
  - "Mixed-Up Confusion" [Takes 3–5] – Takes 3 and 5 released on The 50th Anniversary Collection
  - "Corrina, Corrina" (Traditional) [Remake] [Take 6] – Take 6 released on The Freewheelin' Bob Dylan

=== Witmark demo recordings, part 2 ===
==== November 1962 ====
- Witmark Studio, New York City (time unknown)
  - "Long Ago, Far Away" – Demo recording released on The Bootleg Series Vol. 9 – The Witmark Demos: 1962–1964

=== The Freewheelin' Bob Dylan sessions, part 4 ===
==== November 1, 1962 ====
- Studio A, Columbia Recording Studios, New York City (2.30pm-5.30pm)
  - "Mixed-Up Confusion" [Takes 6–11] – Takes 6, 7, 8, 10 and 11 released on The 50th Anniversary Collection
  - "That's All Right (Mama)" (Crudup) [Take 3] – Take 3 released on The 50th Anniversary Collection
  - "Rocks and Gravel" [Remake] [Takes 1–2] – Take 2 released on The 50th Anniversary Collection; full band version released on the True Detective soundtrack

==== November 14, 1962 ====
- Studio A, Columbia Recording Studios, New York City (3.00pm-6.00 pm)
  - "Mixed-Up Confusion" [Takes unknown] – Take unknown released as a single; included on Biograph
  - "Don't Think Twice, It's All Right" [Takes unknown] – Take unknown released on The Freewheelin' Bob Dylan
  - "Ballad of Hollis Brown" [Takes unknown] – Take 2 released on The 50th Anniversary Collection
  - "Kingsport Town" (Traditional) [Takes unknown]
    - Take 1 – Released on The 50th Anniversary Collection
    - Take unknown – Released on The Bootleg Series Volumes 1–3 (Rare & Unreleased) 1961–1991
  - "When Death Comes Creepin' (Whatcha Gonna Do?)" [Takes unknown] – Take 1 released on The 50th Anniversary Collection

==== December 6, 1962 ====
- Studio A, Columbia Recording Studios, New York City (5.00pm-6.00 pm)
  - "Hero Blues" [Take 1] – Take 1 released on The 50th Anniversary Collection
  - "When Death Comes Creepin' (Whatcha Gonna Do?)" [Remake] [Take 1] – Take 1 released on The 50th Anniversary Collection
  - "Oxford Town" [Take 1] – Take 1 released on The Freewheelin' Bob Dylan
  - "I Shall Be Free" [Takes 1–5]
    - Take 2 – Released on The Freewheelin' Bob Dylan
    - Takes 3 and 5 – Released on The 50th Anniversary Collection
  - "Hero Blues" [Takes 2–4] – Takes 2 and 4 released on The 50th Anniversary Collection
  - "A Hard Rain's a-Gonna Fall" [Take 1] – Take 1 released on The Freewheelin' Bob Dylan

=== Witmark demo recordings, part 3 ===
==== December 1962 ====
- Witmark & Sons Demos, New York City (time unknown)
  - "A Hard Rain's a-Gonna Fall" – Demo recording released on The Bootleg Series Vol. 9 – The Witmark Demos: 1962–1964
  - "Tomorrow is a Long Time" – Demo recording released on The Bootleg Series Vol. 9 – The Witmark Demos: 1962–1964
  - "The Death of Emmett Till" – Demo recording released on The Bootleg Series Vol. 9 – The Witmark Demos: 1962–1964
  - "Let Me Die in My Footsteps" – Demo recording released on The Bootleg Series Vol. 9 – The Witmark Demos: 1962–1964
  - "Ballad of Hollis Brown" – Demo recording released on The Bootleg Series Vol. 9 – The Witmark Demos: 1962–1964
  - "Quit Your Low Down Ways" – Demo recording released on The Bootleg Series Vol. 9 – The Witmark Demos: 1962–1964
  - "Baby, I'm in the Mood for You" – Demo recording released on The Bootleg Series Vol. 9 – The Witmark Demos: 1962–1964

== 1963 ==
=== Witmark demo recordings, part 4 ===
==== Winter 1963 ====
- Witmark Studio, New York City (possibly February, time unknown)
  - "Bound to Lose, Bound to Win" – Demo recording released on The Bootleg Series Vol. 9 – The Witmark Demos: 1962–1964
  - "All Over You" – Demo recording released on The Bootleg Series Vol. 9 – The Witmark Demos: 1962–1964
  - "I'd Hate to Be You on That Dreadful Day" – Demo recording released on The Bootleg Series Vol. 9 – The Witmark Demos: 1962–1964
  - "Talkin' John Birch Paranoid Blues" – Demo recording released on The Bootleg Series Vol. 9 – The Witmark Demos: 1962–1964

==== March 1963 ====
- Witmark Studio, New York City (time unknown)
  - "Long Time Gone" – Demo recording released on The Bootleg Series Vol. 9 – The Witmark Demos: 1962–1964
  - "Masters of War" – Demo recording released on The Bootleg Series Vol. 9 – The Witmark Demos: 1962–1964
  - "Farewell" – Demo recording released on The Bootleg Series Vol. 9 – The Witmark Demos: 1962–1964
  - "Oxford Town" – Demo recording released on The Bootleg Series Vol. 9 – The Witmark Demos: 1962–1964
  - "Don't Think Twice, It's All Right" – Demo recording released on The Bootleg Series Vol. 7: No Direction Home: The Soundtrack; included on The Bootleg Series Vol. 9 – The Witmark Demos: 1962–1964
  - "Walkin' Down the Line" – Demo recording released on The Bootleg Series Volumes 1-3 (Rare & Unreleased) 1961-1991; included on The Bootleg Series Vol. 9 – The Witmark Demos: 1962–1964

=== Television performance ===
==== March 3, 1963 ====
- Westinghouse Studios, New York City (time unknown)
  - "Man of Constant Sorrow" (Traditional) – Live recording released on The Bootleg Series Vol. 7: No Direction Home: The Soundtrack

=== Witmark demo recordings, part 5 ===
==== April 1963 ====
- Witmark Studio, New York City (time unknown)
  - "I Shall Be Free" – Demo recording released on The Bootleg Series Vol. 9 – The Witmark Demos: 1962–1964
  - "Bob Dylan's Blues" – Demo recording released on The Bootleg Series Vol. 9 – The Witmark Demos: 1962–1964
  - "Bob Dylan's Dream" – Demo recording released on The Bootleg Series Vol. 9 – The Witmark Demos: 1962–1964
  - "Boots of Spanish Leather" – Demo recording released on The Bootleg Series Vol. 9 – The Witmark Demos: 1962–1964

=== Town Hall concert ===
==== April 12, 1963 ====
- Town Hall, New York City (time unknown)
  - "Blowin' in the Wind" – Live recording released on The Bootleg Series Vol. 7: No Direction Home: The Soundtrack
  - "Tomorrow Is a Long Time" – Live recording released on Bob Dylan's Greatest Hits Vol. II
  - "Masters of War" – Live recording released on The Bootleg Series Vol. 7: No Direction Home: The Soundtrack
  - "Last Thoughts on Woody Guthrie" – Live recording released on The Bootleg Series Volumes 1–3 (Rare & Unreleased) 1961–1991

=== New York home recordings, part 3 ===
==== April 19, 1963 ====
- Home of Eve and Mac MacKenzie, New York City (time unknown)
  - "I Rode Out One Morning" – Live recording released on The 50th Anniversary Collection
  - "House of the Risin' Sun" (Traditional) – Live recording released on The 50th Anniversary Collection

=== The Freewheelin' Bob Dylan sessions, part 5 ===
==== April 23, 1963 ====
- Studio A, Columbia Recording Studios, New York City (10.00am-1.00 pm)
  - "Girl from the North Country" [Takes 1–2] – Take 2 released on The Freewheelin' Bob Dylan
  - "Masters of War" [Takes 1–3] – Take 3 released on The Freewheelin' Bob Dylan
  - "Walls of Red Wing" [Takes 1–3] – Take 3 released on The Bootleg Series Volumes 1–3 (Rare & Unreleased) 1961–1991
  - "Talkin' World War III Blues" (takes 1–5) – Take 3 released on The Freewheelin' Bob Dylan
  - "Bob Dylan's Dream" [Takes 1–2] – Take 2 released on The Freewheelin' Bob Dylan
  - "Girl from the North Country" [Takes 3–6]
  - "Masters of War" [Takes 4–6]

=== Witmark demo recordings, part 5 ===
==== May 1963 ====
- Witmark Studio, New York City (time unknown)
  - "Girl from the North Country" – Demo recording released on The Bootleg Series Vol. 9 – The Witmark Demos: 1962–1964
  - "Seven Curses" – Demo recording released on The Bootleg Series Vol. 9 – The Witmark Demos: 1962–1964
  - "Hero Blues" – Demo recording released on The Bootleg Series Vol. 9 – The Witmark Demos: 1962–1964

=== Brandeis University concert ===
==== May 10, 1963 ====
- Brandeis University, Waltham, Massachusetts (time unknown)
  - "Honey, Just Allow Me One More Chance" – Live recording released on In Concert – Brandeis University 1963
  - "Talkin' John Birch Paranoid Blues" – Live recording released on In Concert – Brandeis University 1963
  - "Ballad of Hollis Brown" – Live recording released on In Concert – Brandeis University 1963
  - "Masters of War" – Live recording released on In Concert – Brandeis University 1963
  - "Talking World War III Blues" – Live recording released on In Concert – Brandeis University 1963
  - "Bob Dylan's Dream" – Live recording released on In Concert – Brandeis University 1963
  - "Talkin' Bear Mountain Picnic Massacre Blues" – Live recording released on In Concert – Brandeis University 1963

=== The Times They Are A-Changin' sessions, part 1 ===
==== August 6, 1963 ====
- Studio A, Columbia Recording Studios, New York City (2.30am-5.30 pm)
  - "Boots of Spanish Leather" [Take 1]
  - "Only a Pawn in Their Game" [Takes 1–6]
  - "North Country Blues" [Takes 1–4] – Take 4 released on The Times They Are a-Changin'
  - "Ballad of Hollis Brown" [Remake] [Takes 1–3]
  - "Seven Curses" [Takes 1–3] – Take 3 released on The Bootleg Series Volumes 1-3 (Rare & Unreleased) 1961-1991
  - "With God on Our Side" [Takes 1–5]
  - "Farewell" [Takes 1–4] – Take 4 released on Inside Llewyn Davis
  - "Ballad of Hollis Brown" [Remake] [Take 4]
  - "Bob Dylan's New Orleans Rag" [Take 1]

==== August 7, 1963 ====
- Studio A, Columbia Recording Studios, New York City (2.30am-5.30 pm)
  - "Ballad of Hollis Brown" [Remake 2] [Take 1] – Take 1 released on The Times They Are a-Changin'
  - "With God on Our Side" [Remake] [Take 1] – Take 1 released on The Times They Are a-Changin'
  - "Only a Pawn in Their Game" [Remake] [Take 1] – Take 1 released on The Times They Are a-Changin'
  - "Boots of Spanish Leather" [Remake] [Take 1] – Take 1 released on The Times They Are a-Changin'
  - "Walls of Red Wing" [Remake] [Take 1]
  - "Eternal Circle" [Takes 1–4]
  - "Bob Dylan's New Orleans Rag" [Remake] [Takes 1–3]

==== August 12, 1963 ====
- Studio A, Columbia Recording Studios, New York City (2.30am-5.30 pm)
  - "Paths of Victory" [Take 1] – Take 1 released on The Bootleg Series Volumes 1–3 (Rare & Unreleased) 1961–1991
  - "Bob Dylan's New Orleans Rag" [Remake 2] [Take 1]
  - "Hero Blues" [Takes 1–3] – Take 3 released on The 50th Anniversary Collection 1963
  - "Moonshiner" (Traditional) [Take 1] – Take 1 released on The Bootleg Series Volumes 1–3 (Rare & Unreleased) 1961–1991
  - "Eternal Circle" [remake] [Takes 1–4] – Take 4 released on The 50th Anniversary Collection 1963
  - "Only a Hobo" [Takes 1–2] – Take 1 released on The Bootleg Series Volumes 1–3 (Rare & Unreleased) 1961–1991
  - "Moonshiner" (Traditional) [Remake] [Take 1]

=== Witmark demo recordings, part 6 ===
==== August 1963 ====
- Witmark Studio, New York City (time unknown)
  - "Whatcha Gonna Do" – Demo recording released on The Bootleg Series Vol. 9 – The Witmark Demos: 1962–1964
  - "Gypsy Lou" – Demo recording released on The Bootleg Series Vol. 9 – The Witmark Demos: 1962–1964
  - "Ain't Gonna Grieve" – Demo recording released on The Bootleg Series Vol. 9 – The Witmark Demos: 1962–1964
  - "John Brown" – Demo recording released on The Bootleg Series Vol. 9 – The Witmark Demos: 1962–1964
  - "Only a Hobo" – Demo recording released on The Bootleg Series Vol. 9 – The Witmark Demos: 1962–1964
  - "When the Ship Comes In" – Demo recording released on The Bootleg Series Volumes 1–3 (Rare & Unreleased) 1961–1991; included on The Bootleg Series Vol. 9 – The Witmark Demos: 1962–1964

==== October 1963 ====
- Witmark Studio, New York City (time unknown)
  - "The Times They Are a-Changin'" – Demo recording released on The Bootleg Series Volumes 1–3 (Rare & Unreleased) 1961–1991; included on The Bootleg Series Vol. 9 – The Witmark Demos: 1962–1964

=== The Times They Are A-Changin' sessions, part 2 ===
==== October 23, 1963 ====
- Studio A, Columbia Recording Studios, New York City (10.00am-1.00pm)
  - "The Lonesome Death of Hattie Carroll" [Takes 1–2]
  - "When the Ship Comes In" [Takes 1–2]
  - "The Times They Are a-Changin'" [Take 1]
  - "Percy's Song" [Take 1] – Take 1 released on Biograph; included on The 50th Anniversary Collection 1963
  - "The Lonesome Death of Hattie Carroll" [Takes 3–4] – Take 4 released on The Times They Are a-Changin'
  - "When the Ship Comes In" [Takes 3–4] – Take 4 released on The Times They Are a-Changin'
  - "The Times They Are a-Changin'" [Takes 2–7] – Take 2 or 7 released on Love and Theft (limited edition)
  - "East Laredo Blues" [Take 1] – Take 1 released on The 50th Anniversary Collection 1963
  - "Key to the Highway" (Charles Segar/Big Bill Broonzy) [Take 1]
  - "That's All Right (Mama)" / "Sally Free and Easy" (Arthur Crudup) [Remake] [Take 1] – Take 1 released on The 50th Anniversary Collection 1963

==== October 24, 1963 ====
- Studio A, Columbia Recording Studios, New York City (10.00am-1.00 pm)
  - "Eternal Circle" [Remake 2] [Takes 1–4] – Take 1 released on The Bootleg Series Volumes 1–3 (Rare & Unreleased) 1961–1991
  - "One Too Many Mornings" [Takes 1–3]
  - "The Times They Are a-Changin'" [Remake] [Take 1] – Take 1 released on The Times They Are a-Changin'
  - "Percy's Song" [remake] [Takes 1–3]
  - "Lay Down Your Weary Tune" [Take 1] – Take 1 released on Biograph
  - "One Too Many Mornings" [Takes 4–6] – Take 6 released on The Times They Are a-Changin'
  - "Suze (The Cough Song)" [Take 1] – Take 1 released on The Bootleg Series Volumes 1–3 (Rare & Unreleased) 1961–1991
  - "Bob Dylan's New Orleans Rag" [Remake 3] [Takes 1–2] – Take 2 released on The 50th Anniversary Collection 1963

=== Carnegie Hall concert ===
==== October 26, 1963 ====
- Carnegie Hall, New York City (time unknown)
  - "The Times They Are a-Changin'" – Live recording released on Live at Carnegie Hall 1963
  - "Ballad of Hollis Brown" – Live recording released on Live at Carnegie Hall 1963
  - "Who Killed Davey Moore?" – Live recording released on The Bootleg Series Volumes 1–3 (Rare & Unreleased) 1961–1991
  - "Boots of Spanish Leather" – Live recording released on Live at Carnegie Hall 1963
  - "Talkin' John Birch Paranoid Blues" – Live recording released on The Bootleg Series Volumes 1–3 (Rare & Unreleased) 1961–1991
  - "Lay Down Your Weary Tune" – Live recording released on Live at Carnegie Hall 1963
  - "North Country Blues" – Live recording released on Live at Carnegie Hall 1963
  - "A Hard Rain's a-Gonna Fall" – Live recording released on The Bootleg Series Vol. 7: No Direction Home: The Soundtrack
  - "With God on Our Side" – Live recording released on Live at Carnegie Hall 1963
  - "When the Ship Comes In" – Live recording released on The Bootleg Series Vol. 7: No Direction Home: The Soundtrack

=== The Times They Are A-Changin' sessions, part 3 ===
==== October 31, 1963 ====
- Studio A, Columbia Recording Studios, New York City (11.00am-1.00pm)
  - "Restless Farewell" [Takes 1–9] – Take 9 released on The Times They Are a-Changin'

=== Witmark demo recordings, part 7 ===
==== December 1963 ====
- Witmark Studio, New York City (time unknown)
  - "Paths of Victory" – Demo recording released on The Bootleg Series Vol. 9 – The Witmark Demos: 1962–1964

== 1964 ==
=== Witmark demo recordings, part 8 ===
==== January 1964 ====
- Witmark Studio, New York City (time unknown)
  - "Guess I'm Doing Fine" – Demo recording released on The Bootleg Series Vol. 9 – The Witmark Demos: 1962–1964
  - "Baby, Let Me Follow You Down" – Demo recording released on The Bootleg Series Vol. 9 – The Witmark Demos: 1962–1964

=== Another Side of Bob Dylan session ===
==== June 9, 1964 ====
- Studio A, Columbia Recording Studios, New York City (7.00am-10.00pm)
  - "Denise" [Take 1]
  - "Denise" [Composite] [Take 1]
  - "Denise" [Composite 2] [Takes 1–2]
  - "It Ain't Me, Babe" [Takes 1–2] – Take 2 released on Another Side of Bob Dylan
  - "To Ramona" [Take 1] – Take 1 released on Another Side of Bob Dylan
  - "Spanish Harlem Incident" [Takes 1–5] – Take 5 released on Another Side of Bob Dylan
  - "Ballad in Plain D" [Takes 1–4]
  - "Ballad in Plain D" [Insert 1] [Take 1]
    - Edit of Take 1 and Insert 1 Take 1 – Released on Another Side of Bob Dylan
  - "I Don't Believe You (She Acts Like We Never Have Met)" [Takes 1–5] – Take 5 released on Another Side of Bob Dylan
  - "Chimes of Freedom" [Takes 1–7] – Take 7 released on Another Side of Bob Dylan
  - "Motorpsycho Nitemare" [Takes 1–4] – Take 4 released on Another Side of Bob Dylan
  - "Mr. Tambourine Man" [Takes 1–2] – Take 2 released on The Bootleg Series Vol. 7: No Direction Home: The Soundtrack
  - "All I Really Want to Do" [Take 1] – Take 1 released on Another Side of Bob Dylan
  - "Black Crow Blues" [Takes 1–3] – Take 3 released on Another Side of Bob Dylan
  - "I Shall Be Free No. 10" [Takes 1–4]
  - "I Shall Be Free No. 10" [Insert 1] [Take 1]
    - Edit of Take 4 and Insert 1 Take 1 released on Another Side of Bob Dylan
  - "Mama, You Been on My Mind" [Take 1] – Take 1 released on The Bootleg Series Volumes 1-3 (Rare & Unreleased) 1961-1991
  - "My Back Pages" [Takes 1–2] – Take 2 released on Another Side of Bob Dylan

=== Witmark demo recordings, part 9 ===
==== June 1964 ====
- Unidentified recording studio, New York City (time unknown)
  - "Mr. Tambourine Man" – Demo recording released on The Bootleg Series Vol. 9 – The Witmark Demos: 1962–1964
  - "Mama, You Been on My Mind" – Demo recording released on The Bootleg Series Vol. 9 – The Witmark Demos: 1962–1964
  - "I'll Keep It with Mine" – Demo recording released on The Bootleg Series Vol. 9 – The Witmark Demos: 1962–1964

=== Newport Folk Festival 1964 ===
==== July 26, 1964 ====
- Freebody Park, Newport, Rhode Island (time unknown)
  - "Chimes of Freedom" – Live recording released on The Bootleg Series Vol. 7: No Direction Home: The Soundtrack

=== Philharmonic Hall concert ===
==== October 31, 1964 ====
- Philharmonic Hall, New York City (time unknown)
  - "The Times They Are a-Changin'" – Live recording released on The Bootleg Series Vol. 6: Bob Dylan Live 1964, Concert at Philharmonic Hall
  - "Spanish Harlem Incident" – Live recording released on The Bootleg Series Vol. 6: Bob Dylan Live 1964, Concert at Philharmonic Hall
  - "Talkin' John Birch Paranoid Blues" – Live recording released on The Bootleg Series Vol. 6: Bob Dylan Live 1964, Concert at Philharmonic Hall
  - "To Ramona" – Live recording released on The Bootleg Series Vol. 6: Bob Dylan Live 1964, Concert at Philharmonic Hall
  - "Who Killed Davey Moore?" – Live recording released on The Bootleg Series Vol. 6: Bob Dylan Live 1964, Concert at Philharmonic Hall
  - "Gates of Eden" – Live recording released on The Bootleg Series Vol. 6: Bob Dylan Live 1964, Concert at Philharmonic Hall
  - "If You Gotta Go, Go Now (Or Else You Got to Stay All Night)" – Live recording released on The Bootleg Series Vol. 6: Bob Dylan Live 1964, Concert at Philharmonic Hall
  - "It's Alright, Ma (I'm Only Bleeding)" – Live recording released on The Bootleg Series Vol. 6: Bob Dylan Live 1964, Concert at Philharmonic Hall
  - "I Don't Believe You (She Acts Like We Never Have Met)" – Live recording released on The Bootleg Series Vol. 6: Bob Dylan Live 1964, Concert at Philharmonic Hall
  - "Mr. Tambourine Man" – Live recording released on The Bootleg Series Vol. 6: Bob Dylan Live 1964, Concert at Philharmonic Hall
  - "A Hard Rain's a-Gonna Fall" – Live recording released on The Bootleg Series Vol. 6: Bob Dylan Live 1964, Concert at Philharmonic Hall
  - "Talkin' World War III Blues" – Live recording released on The Bootleg Series Vol. 6: Bob Dylan Live 1964, Concert at Philharmonic Hall
  - "Don't Think Twice, It's All Right" – Live recording released on The Bootleg Series Vol. 6: Bob Dylan Live 1964, Concert at Philharmonic Hall
  - "The Lonesome Death of Hattie Carroll" – Live recording released on The Bootleg Series Vol. 6: Bob Dylan Live 1964, Concert at Philharmonic Hall
  - "Mama, You Been on My Mind" – Live recording released on The Bootleg Series Vol. 6: Bob Dylan Live 1964, Concert at Philharmonic Hall
  - "Silver Dagger" (Traditional) – Live recording released on The Bootleg Series Vol. 6: Bob Dylan Live 1964, Concert at Philharmonic Hall
  - "With God on Our Side" – Live recording released on The Bootleg Series Vol. 6: Bob Dylan Live 1964, Concert at Philharmonic Hall
  - "It Ain't Me, Babe" – Live recording released on The Bootleg Series Vol. 6: Bob Dylan Live 1964, Concert at Philharmonic Hall
  - "All I Really Want to Do" – Live recording released on The Bootleg Series Vol. 6: Bob Dylan Live 1964, Concert at Philharmonic Hall

== 1965 ==
=== Bringing It All Back Home sessions ===
==== January 13, 1965 ====
- Studio A, Columbia Recording Studios, New York City (7.00am-10.00 pm)
  - "Love Minus Zero/No Limit" [Takes 1–2]
  - "I'll Keep It with Mine" [Take 1] – Take 1 released on Biograph
  - "It's All Over Now, Baby Blue" [Take 1] – Take 1 released on The Bootleg Series Vol. 7: No Direction Home: The Soundtrack
  - "Bob Dylan's 115th Dream" [Takes 1–2] – the abortive Take 1 was released on Bringing It All Back Home as the introduction to the final version.
  - "She Belongs to Me" [Take 1]
  - "Subterranean Homesick Blues" [Take 1] – Take 1 released on The Bootleg Series Volumes 1-3 (Rare & Unreleased) 1961-1991
  - "Outlaw Blues" [Take 1]
  - "On the Road Again" [Take 1]
  - "Farewell Angelina" [Take 1] – Take 1 released on The Bootleg Series Volumes 1–3 (Rare & Unreleased) 1961–1991
  - "If You Gotta Go, Go Now" [Take 1]
  - "If You Gotta Go, Go Now" [Addition] [Take 1]
  - "You Don't Have to Do That" [Take 1]
  - "Love Minus Zero/No Limit" [Take 3]
  - "She Belongs to Me" [Take 2] released on Bootleg Series vol. 7
  - "California" [Take 1] – Take 1 released on NCIS The Official TV Soundtrack Vol. 2
  - "Outlaw Blues" [Takes 1–2]

==== January 14, 1965 ====
- Studio A, Columbia Recording Studios, New York City (2.30pm-5.30 pm, 7.00pm-10.00 pm)
  - "Love Minus Zero/No Limit" [Remake] [Takes 1–2] – Take 2 released on Bringing It All Back Home
  - "Love Minus Zero/No Limit" [Insert 1] [Take 1]
  - "Subterranean Homesick Blues" [Remake] [Takes 1–3] – Take 3 released on Bringing It All Back Home
  - "Outlaw Blues" [Remake] [Takes 1–3]
  - "Outlaw Blues" [Overdub] [Take 1]
    - Edit of Take 3 and Overdub Take 1 – Released on Bringing It All Back Home
  - "She Belongs to Me" [Remake] [Takes 1–2]
    - Take 2 – Released on Bringing It All Back Home
  - "Bob Dylan's 115th Dream" [Remake] [Takes 1–2] – Edit of Take 1 intro and Take 2 released on Bringing It All Back Home
  - "On the Road Again" [Remake] [Takes 1–4]

==== January 15, 1965 ====
- Studio A, Columbia Recording Studios, New York City (2.30pm-5.30 pm)
  - "Maggie's Farm" [Take 1] – Take 1 released on Bringing It All Back Home
  - "On the Road Again" [Remake 2] [Takes 1–13] – Take 13 released on Bringing It All Back Home
  - "It's Alright, Ma (I'm Only Bleeding)" [Takes 1–2] – Take 2 released on Bringing It All Back Home
  - "Gates of Eden" [Take 1] – Take 1 released on Bringing It All Back Home
  - "Mr. Tambourine Man" [Remake] [Takes 1–6] – Take 6 released on Bringing It All Back Home
  - "It's All Over Now, Baby Blue" [Remake] [Take 1] – Take 1 released on Bringing It All Back Home
  - "If You Gotta Go, Go Now" [Remake] [Takes 1–4]

=== Highway 61 Revisited sessions, part 1 ===
==== June 15, 1965 ====
- Studio A, Columbia Recording Studios, New York City (2.30pm-6.30 pm)
  - "It Takes a Lot to Laugh, It Takes a Train to Cry" [Takes 1–9] – Take 1 released on some editions of The Bootleg Series Vol. 12: The Cutting Edge and on Dylan's Vevo channel; Take 9 released on The Bootleg Series Vol. 7: No Direction Home: The Soundtrack
  - "Sitting on a Barbed Wire Fence" [Takes 1–3]
  - "It Takes a Lot to Laugh, It Takes a Train to Cry" [Remake] [Take 1] – Take 1 released on The Bootleg Series Volumes 1–3 (Rare & Unreleased) 1961–1991
  - "Sitting on a Barbed Wire Fence" [Takes 4–6]
  - "Like a Rolling Stone" [Takes 1–5] – Take 4 released on The Bootleg Series Volumes 1–3 (Rare & Unreleased) 1961–1991; Take 5 released on The Bootleg Series Vol. 12: The Cutting Edge

==== June 16, 1965 ====
- Studio A, Columbia Recording Studios, New York City (2.30pm-5.30 pm)
  - "Like a Rolling Stone" [Remake] [Takes 1–15] – Take 4 released on Highway 61 Revisited

=== Newport Folk Festival 1965 ===
==== July 25, 1965 ====
- Freebody Park, Newport, Rhode Island (time unknown)
  - "Maggie's Farm" – Live recording released on The Bootleg Series Vol. 7: No Direction Home: The Soundtrack
  - "Like a Rolling Stone"
  - "It Takes a Lot to Laugh, It Takes a Train to Cry"
  - "It's All Over Now, Baby Blue"
  - "Mr. Tambourine Man"

=== Highway 61 Revisited sessions, part 2 ===
==== July 29, 1965 ====
- Studio A, Columbia Recording Studios, New York City (10.00am-1.00pm, 2.30pm-6.00pm)
  - "It Takes a Lot to Laugh, It Takes a Train to Cry" [Remake 2] [Takes 1–3]
  - "Tombstone Blues" [Takes 1–7, 9–12]
    - Take 9 – Released on The Bootleg Series Vol. 7: No Direction Home: The Soundtrack
    - Take 12 – Released on Highway 61 Revisited
  - "It Takes a Lot to Laugh, It Takes a Train to Cry" [Remake 3] [Takes 1–4] – Take 4 released on Highway 61 Revisited
  - "Positively 4th Street" [Takes 1–8, 10, 12] – Take 12 released as a single; included on Bob Dylan's Greatest Hits and Biograph
  - "Desolation Row" [Take 1] Released on Bootleg Series vol.7

==== July 30, 1965 ====
- Studio A, Columbia Recording Studios, New York City (2.30am-5.30 pm, 7.00am-10.00 pm)
  - "From a Buick 6" [Takes 1–2, 4–5] – Take 5 released on Highway 61 Revisited
  - "Can You Please Crawl Out Your Window?" [Takes 1–17]

==== August 2, 1965 ====
- Studio A, Columbia Recording Studios, New York City (8.00pm-3.30 am)
  - "Highway 61 Revisited" [Takes 1–5]
  - "Highway 61 Revisited" [Remake] [Takes 5–9]
    - Take 6 – Released on The Bootleg Series Vol. 7: No Direction Home: The Soundtrack
    - Take 9 – Released on Highway 61 Revisited
  - "Just Like Tom Thumb's Blues" [Takes 1–16]
    - Take 5 – Released on The Bootleg Series Vol. 7: No Direction Home: The Soundtrack
    - Take 16 – Released on Highway 61 Revisited
  - "Queen Jane Approximately" [Takes 1–7] – Take 7 released on Highway 61 Revisited
  - "Ballad of a Thin Man" [Takes 1–3] – Take 3 released on Highway 61 Revisited
  - "Ballad of a Thin Man" [Insert 1] [Take 1]
  - "Desolation Row" [Remake] [Takes 1–5]

==== August 4, 1965 ====
- Studio A, Columbia Recording Studios, New York City (1.00pm-4.00 pm)
  - "Desolation Row" [Takes 1–2]
  - "Desolation Row" [Incut] [Take 1]
  - "Desolation Row" [Take 5]
  - "Desolation Row" [Overdub] [Composite 1] [Take 6]
  - "Desolation Row" [Overdub] [Composite 1] [Take 7]
    - Edit of Composite 1 Take 6 and Take 7 – Released on Highway 61 Revisited
  - "Tombstone Blues" [Overdub] [Composite 2] [Take 1]

=== Blonde on Blonde sessions, part 1 ===
==== October 5, 1965 ====
- Studio A, Columbia Recording Studios, New York City (7.00 pm—2.30 am)
  - "Medicine Sunday" [Takes 1–2]
  - "Jet Pilot" [Takes 1] – Take 1 released on Biograph
  - "I Wanna Be Your Lover [rehearsal]
  - "Can You Please Crawl Out Your Window?" [Remake] [Takes 1–2] – Take 2 released on Biograph
  - "I Wanna Be Your Lover" [Takes 1–7] – Take 7 released on Biograph
  - "Instrumental Track" [Takes 1–2]

==== November 30, 1965 ====
- Studio A, Columbia Recording Studios, New York City (2.30pm-5.30 pm, 7.00pm-10.00 pm)
  - "Visions of Johanna" [Takes 1–14] – Take 8 released on The Bootleg Series Vol. 7: No Direction Home: The Soundtrack
  - "Can You Please Crawl Out Your Window?" [Remake 2] [Takes 1–10] – Take 6, 8 or 10 released as a single

== 1966 ==
=== Blonde on Blonde sessions, part 2 ===
==== January 21, 1966 ====
- Studio A, Columbia Recording Studios, New York City (2.30pm-5.30 pm, 7.00pm-10.00 pm, 11.30pm-2.30 am)
  - "She's Your Lover Now" [Takes 1–16] – Take 15 released on The Bootleg Series Volumes 1-3 (Rare & Unreleased) 1961-1991

==== January 25, 1966 ====
- Studio A, Columbia Recording Studios, New York City (2.30pm-5.30 pm, 7.00pm-10.00 pm, 11.30pm-2.30 am)
  - "Leopard-Skin Pill-Box Hat" [Takes 1–2] – Take 1 released on The Bootleg Series Vol. 7: No Direction Home: The Soundtrack
  - "One of Us Must Know (Sooner or Later)" [Takes 1–24] – Take 24 released on Blonde on Blonde

==== January 27, 1966 ====
- Studio A, Columbia Recording Studios, New York City (2.30pm-2.30 am)
  - "Lunatic princess" [take 1]
  - "Leopard-Skin Pill-Box Hat" [Remake] [Take 1]
  - "Leopard-Skin Pill-Box Hat" [Remake] [Insert] [Take 1 and 2 unnumbered takes]
  - "One of Us Must Know (Sooner or Later)" [Insert 1] [Takes 1–3]
  - "I'll Keep It with Mine" [Rehearsal] [Take 1] – Take 1 released on The Bootleg Series Volumes 1–3 (Rare & Unreleased) 1961–1991

==== February 14, 1966 ====
- Columbia Music Row Studios, Nashville, Tennessee (2.00pm-6.00 pm, 6.00pm-9.30 pm)
  - "4th Time Around" [Takes 1–19] – Take 19 released on Blonde on Blonde
  - "Visions of Johanna" [Remake] [Takes 1–4] – Take 4 released on Blonde on Blonde
  - "Leopard-Skin Pill-Box Hat" [Takes 1–13]

==== February 16, 1966 ====
- Columbia Music Row Studios, Nashville, Tennessee (1.00am-4.00 am, 4.00am-5.30 am)
  - "I'll Keep It with Mine" [instrumental] [Takes 1–9]
  - "Sad Eyed Lady of the Lowlands" [Takes 1–4] – Take 4 released on Blonde on Blonde

==== February 17, 1966 ====
- Columbia Music Row Studios, Nashville, Tennessee (4.00am-7.00 am)
  - "Stuck Inside of Mobile with the Memphis Blues Again" [Take 1 + rehearsal]
  - "Stuck Inside of Mobile with the Memphis Blues Again" [Remake] [Takes 1–4]
  - "Stuck Inside of Mobile with the Memphis Blues Again" [Remake 2] [Takes 4–15]
    - Take 5 released on The Bootleg Series Vol. 7: No Direction Home: The Soundtrack
    - Take 15 released on Blonde on Blonde

==== March 8, 1966 ====
- Columbia Music Row Studios, Nashville, Tennessee (1.00am-4.00am, 2.00pm-6.00pm, 6.00pm-9.00pm, 9.00pm-12.00am)
  - "Absolutely Sweet Marie" [Takes 1–3] – Take 3 released on Blonde on Blonde
  - "Just Like a Woman" [Takes 1–4]
  - "Pledging My Time" [Takes 1–3] – Take 3 released on Blonde on Blonde
  - "Just Like a Woman" [Takes 5–18] – Take 18 released on Blonde on Blonde

==== March 9, 1966 ====
- Columbia Recording Studios, Nashville, Tennessee (6.00pm-9.00 pm, 9.00pm-12.00 am)
  - "Most Likely You Go Your Way And I'll Go Mine" [Takes 1–6] – Take 6 released on Blonde on Blonde
  - "Temporary Like Achilles" [Takes 1–4] – Take 4 released on Blonde on Blonde

==== March 10, 1966 ====
- Columbia Music Row Studios, Nashville, Tennessee (12.00am-3.00 am, 3.00am-7.00 am)
  - "Rainy Day Women#12 & 35" [Take 1] – Take 1 released on Blonde on Blonde
  - "Obviously 5 Believers" [Takes 1–4] – Take 4 released on Blonde on Blonde
  - "Leopard-Skin Pill-Box Hat" [Remake 5] [Take 1] – Take 1 released on Blonde on Blonde
  - "I Want You" [Takes 1–5] – Take 5 released on Blonde on Blonde

=== World Tour 1966 ===
==== May 6, 1966 ====
- ABC, Belfast, Northern Ireland (time unknown)
  - "I Don't Believe You (She Acts Like We Never Have Met)" - Live recording released on Biograph

==== May 14, 1966 ====
- Odeon Theatre, Liverpool, England (time unknown)
  - "Tell Me, Momma" - Live recording released on The Band: A Musical History
  - "Just Like Tom Thumb's Blues" - Live recording released as B-side of "I Want You;" included on Masterpieces

==== May 17, 1966 ====
- Free Trade Hall, Manchester, England (time unknown)
  - "She Belongs to Me" - Live recording released on The Bootleg Series Vol. 4: Bob Dylan Live 1966, The "Royal Albert Hall" Concert
  - "4th Time Around" - Live recording released on The Bootleg Series Vol. 4: Bob Dylan Live 1966, The "Royal Albert Hall" Concert
  - "Visions of Johanna" - Live recording released on The Bootleg Series Vol. 4: Bob Dylan Live 1966, The "Royal Albert Hall" Concert
  - "It's All Over Now, Baby Blue" - Live version also released on Biograph; included on The Bootleg Series Vol. 4: Bob Dylan Live 1966, The "Royal Albert Hall" Concert
  - "Desolation Row" - Live recording released on The Bootleg Series Vol. 4: Bob Dylan Live 1966, The "Royal Albert Hall" Concert
  - "Just Like a Woman" - Live recording released on The Bootleg Series Vol. 4: Bob Dylan Live 1966, The "Royal Albert Hall" Concert
  - "Mr. Tambourine Man" - Live recording released on The Bootleg Series Vol. 4: Bob Dylan Live 1966, The "Royal Albert Hall" Concert
  - "Tell Me, Momma" - Live recording released on The Bootleg Series Vol. 4: Bob Dylan Live 1966, The "Royal Albert Hall" Concert
  - "I Don't Believe You (She Acts Like We Never Have Met)" - Live recording released on The Bootleg Series Vol. 4: Bob Dylan Live 1966, The "Royal Albert Hall" Concert
  - "Baby, Let Me Follow You Down" (Eric Von Schmidt) – Live recording released on The Bootleg Series Vol. 4: Bob Dylan Live 1966, The "Royal Albert Hall" Concert
  - "Just Like Tom Thumb's Blues" - Live recording released on The Bootleg Series Vol. 4: Bob Dylan Live 1966, The "Royal Albert Hall" Concert
  - "Leopard-Skin Pill-Box Hat" - Live recording released on The Bootleg Series Vol. 4: Bob Dylan Live 1966, The "Royal Albert Hall" Concert
  - "One Too Many Mornings" - Live recording released on The Bootleg Series Vol. 4: Bob Dylan Live 1966, The "Royal Albert Hall" Concert
  - "Ballad of a Thin Man" - Live recording released on The Bootleg Series Vol. 4: Bob Dylan Live 1966, The "Royal Albert Hall" Concert
  - "Like a Rolling Stone" - Live recording released on The Bootleg Series Vol. 4: Bob Dylan Live 1966, The "Royal Albert Hall" Concert; included on The Bootleg Series Vol. 7: No Direction Home: The Soundtrack

==== May 20, 1966 ====
- ABC Theatre, Edinburgh, Scotland (time unknown)
  - "Ballad of a Thin Man" - Live recording released on The Bootleg Series Vol. 7: No Direction Home: The Soundtrack

==== May 26, 1966 ====
- Royal Albert Hall, London, England (time unknown)
  - "Visions of Johanna" - Live recording released on Biograph

== 1967 ==
=== The Basement Tapes home recordings ===
==== June–October 1967 ====
- "Big Pink" Basement, West Saugerties, New York (times unknown)
  - "Lock Your Door"
  - "Baby, Won't You Be My Baby"
  - "Try Me Little Girl"
  - "Young, But Daily Growin'"
  - "Bonnie Ship the Diamond" (Traditional)
  - "The Hills of Mexico" (Traditional)
  - "Down on Me" (Elmore James)
  - "I Can't Make it Alone"
  - "Don't You Try Me Now"
  - "One For the Road" (Harold Arlen/Johnny Mercer/Bob Dylan)
  - "(Alright) I'm Alright"
  - "One Single River" (Ian Tyson/Silvia Fricker)
  - "People Get Ready" (Curtis Mayfield)
  - "I Don't Hurt Anymore" (Don Robertson/Jack Rollins) [Takes 1–2]
  - "Be Careful of the Stones That You Throw" (Bonnie Todd) [Takes 1–2]
  - "One Man's Loss"
  - "Baby Ain't That Fine" (Dallas Frazier)
  - "Rock, Salt and Nails" (Utah Phillips)
  - "(Now and Then There's) A Fool Such as I" (Bill Trader)
  - "Silhouettes" (Bob Crewe/Frank Slay)
  - "Bring It On Home" (Bo Diddley/Dylan)
  - "King of France"
  - "Nine Hundred Miles" (Traditional)
  - "Going Down the Road Feeling Bad" (Traditional)
  - "Spanish is the Loving Tongue" (Charles Badger Clark)
  - "Po' Lazarus" (Traditional)
  - "Santa-Fe" - Home recording released on The Bootleg Series Volumes 1-3 (Rare & Unreleased) 1961-1991
  - "Instrumental Jam" (Danko/Dylan/Hudson/Manuel/Robertson)
  - "On a Rainy Afternoon"
  - "Come All Ye Fair and Tender Ladies" (Traditional)
  - "Instrumental Blues"
  - "Under Control"
  - "Old Rosin the Beau" (Traditional)
  - "I'm Guilty of Loving You"
  - "Johnny Todd" (Traditional)
  - "Cool Water" (Bob Nolan)
  - "The Auld Triangle (The Royal Canal)" (Dominic Behan)
  - "Belchazaar" (Johnny Cash) [Takes 1–2]
  - "I Forgot to Remember to Forget" (Charlie Feathers/Stan Kesler)
  - "You Win Again" (Hank Williams)
  - "Still in Town, Still Around" (Hank Cochran/Harlan Howard)
  - "Waltzing with Sin" (Red Sovine) [Takes 1–2]
  - "Big River" (Cash) [Takes 1–2]
  - "Folsom Prison Blues" (Cash)
  - "The Bells of Rhymney" (Idris Davies/Pete Seeger)
  - "I Can't Come in with a Broken Heart" [Takes 1–2]
  - "I'm a Fool for You" [Takes 1–2]
  - "Next Time on the Highway"
  - "Tupelo" (John Lee Hooker)
  - "(They) Gotta Quit Kicking My Dog Around" (James A. Bland or Gid Tanner)
  - "See You Later Allen Ginsberg" (Bobby Charles/Dylan) [Takes 1–2]
  - "Tiny Montgomery" - Home recording released on The Basement Tapes
  - "(Big Dog) Won't You Please Come Home"
  - "The Spanish Song (Luisa)" [Takes 1–2]
  - "I'm Your Teenage Prayer" [Takes 1–2]
  - "Four Strong Winds" (Tyson)
  - "The French Girl" (Tyson) [Takes 1–2]
  - "Joshua Gone Barbados" (Eric Von Schmidt)
  - "I'm in the Mood for Love" (Hooker)
  - "All American Boy" (Bill Parsons/Orville Lunsford)
  - "Sign on the Cross"
  - "Silent Weekend"
  - "Pretty Mary"
  - "2 Dollars And 99 Cents"
  - "Jelly Bean"
  - "Don't Ya Tell Henry"
  - "Bourbon Street"
  - "Million Dollar Bash" [Takes 1–2] – Home recording Take 2 released on The Basement Tapes
  - "Yea! Heavy and a Bottle of Bread" [Takes 1–2] – Home recording Take 2 released on The Basement Tapes
  - "I'm Not There (1956)" - Home recording released on I'm Not There (soundtrack)
  - "Please, Mrs. Henry" - Home recording released on The Basement Tapes
  - "Crash on the Levee (Down in the Flood)" [Takes 1–2] – Home recording Take 2 released on The Basement Tapes
  - "Lo and Behold" [Takes 1–2] – Home recording Take 2 released on The Basement Tapes
  - "You Ain't Goin' Nowhere" [Takes 1–2] – Home recording Take 2 (with overdubs) released on The Basement Tapes
  - "Too Much of Nothing" [Takes 1–2] – Home recording Take 1 (with overdubs) released on The Basement Tapes
  - "This Wheel's on Fire" (Danko/Dylan) – Home recording (with overdubs) released on The Basement Tapes
  - "I Shall Be Released" - Home recording released on The Bootleg Series Volumes 1–3 (Rare & Unreleased) 1961–1991
  - "Tears of Rage" (Dylan/Manuel) [Takes 1–3] – Home recording Take 3 released on The Basement Tapes
  - "Quinn the Eskimo (The Mighty Quinn)" [Takes 1–2] – Home recording Take 2 released on Biograph
  - "Open the Door, Homer" [Takes 1–3] – Home recording Take 1 released on The Basement Tapes
  - "Nothing Was Delivered" [Takes 1–3] – Home recording Take 1 released on The Basement Tapes
  - "Goin' to Acapulco" - Home recording released on The Basement Tapes
  - "Gonna Get You Now"
  - "Wildwood Flower" (A. P. Carter)
  - "See That My Grave Is Kept Clean" (Blind Lemon Jefferson)
  - "Coming 'Round the Mountain" (Traditional)
  - "Flight of the Bumblebee"
  - "Confidential" (Dorinda Morgan)
  - "Odds and Ends" [Takes 1–2] – Home recording Take 1 released on The Basement Tapes
  - "Get Your Rocks Off"
  - "Clothes Line Saga (Answer to Ode)" - Home recording released on The Basement Tapes
  - "Apple Suckling Tree" [Takes 1–2] – Home recording Take 2 released on The Basement Tapes
  - "All You Have to Do is Dream" [Takes 1–2]
  - "Minstrel Boy" - Home recording released on The Bootleg Series Vol. 10 – Another Self Portrait (1969–1971)

=== John Wesley Harding sessions ===
==== October 17, 1967 ====
- Studio A, Columbia Recording Studios, Nashville, Tennessee (9.00pm-12.00 pm)
  - "Drifter's Escape" [Takes 1–5] – Take 2 released on John Wesley Harding
  - "I Dreamed I Saw St. Augustine" [Takes 1–4] – Take 4 released on John Wesley Harding
  - "The Ballad of Frankie Lee and Judas Priest" [Take 1] – Take 1 released on John Wesley Harding

==== November 6, 1967 ====
- Studio A, Columbia Recording Studios, Nashville, Tennessee (6.00pm-9.30 pm)
  - "All Along the Watchtower" [Takes 1–3]
  - "All Along the Watchtower" [Insert] [Takes 1–2]
    - Edit of Take 3 and Insert Take 2 – Released on John Wesley Harding
  - "John Wesley Harding" [Takes 1–2] – Take 2 released on John Wesley Harding
  - "As I Went Out One Morning" [Takes 1–5] – Take 5 released on John Wesley Harding
  - "I Pity the Poor Immigrant" [Takes 1–10] – Take 10 released on John Wesley Harding
  - "I Am a Lonesome Hobo" [Takes 1–5] – Take 5 released on John Wesley Harding

==== November 29, 1967 ====
- Studio A, Columbia Recording Studios, Nashville, Tennessee (6.00pm-9.00 pm, 9.00pm-12.00 pm)
  - "The Wicked Messenger" [Takes unknown] – Take unknown released on John Wesley Harding
  - "I'll Be Your Baby Tonight" [Takes unknown] – Take unknown released on John Wesley Harding
  - "Down Along the Cove" [Takes unknown] – Take unknown released on John Wesley Harding
  - "Dear Landlord" [Takes unknown] – Take unknown released on John Wesley Harding

== 1969 ==
=== Nashville Skyline sessions ===
==== February 13, 1969 ====
- Studio A, Columbia Recording Studios, Nashville, Tennessee (6.00pm-9.00 pm, 9.00pm-12.00 am)
  - "To Be Alone with You" [Takes 1–8] – Take 4 released on Nashville Skyline
  - "I Threw It All Away" [Takes 1–4]
    - Take 1 – Released on The Bootleg Series Vol. 10 – Another Self Portrait (1969–1971)
    - Take 4 – Released on Nashville Skyline
  - "Blues" [Take 1]
  - "One More Night" [Takes 1–6] – Take 6 released on Nashville Skyline
  - "Lay Lady Lay" [Takes 1–4]

==== February 14, 1969 ====
- Studio A, Columbia Recording Studios, Nashville, Tennessee (6.00pm-9.00 pm, 9.00pm-12.00 am)
  - "Peggy Day" [Takes 1–3] – Take 3 released on Nashville Skyline
  - "Tell Me That It Isn't True" [Takes 1–8] – Take 3, 6 or 8 released on Nashville Skyline
  - "Country Pie" [Takes 1–2]
    - Take 1 – Released on The Bootleg Series Vol. 10 – Another Self Portrait (1969–1971)
    - Take 2 – Released on Nashville Skyline
  - "Lay Lady Lay" [Remake] [Takes 1–5]

==== February 17, 1969 ====
- Studio A, Columbia Recording Studios, Nashville, Tennessee (2.00pm-5.00 pm)
  - "Nashville Skyline Rag" [Takes 1–2] – Take 2 released on Nashville Skyline
  - "Tonight I'll Be Staying Here with You" [Takes 1–11] – Take 5 released on Nashville Skyline
  - "One Too Many Mornings" [Remake] [Takes 1–5]
  - "One Too Many Mornings" [Remake 2] [Takes 1–6]
  - "I Still Miss Someone" (Johnny Cash/Roy Cash Jr.) [Takes 1–7]
  - "Don't Think Twice, It's All Right/Understand Your Man" (Dylan/Cash) [Takes 1–3]

==== February 18, 1969 ====
- Columbia Recording Studios, Nashville, Tennessee (time unknown)
  - "One Too Many Mornings" [Remake 3] [Takes 1–2]
  - "Mountain Dew" (Bascom Lamar Lunsford/Scott Wiseman) [Takes 1–2]
  - "I Still Miss Someone" [Remake] [Takes 1–4]
  - "Careless Love" (Traditional) [Take 1]
  - "Matchbox" (Carl Perkins) [Takes 1–3]
  - "That's All Right (Mama)" (Arthur Crudup) [Remake 2] [Takes 1–2]
  - "Mystery Train" (Sam Phillips/Herman Parker) [Take 1]
  - "Big River" (Cash) [Takes 1–2]
  - "Girl from the North Country" [Remake] [Takes 1–3] – Take 1 or 3 released on Nashville Skyline
  - "I Walk the Line" (Cash) [Takes 1–2]
  - "How High the Water" [Take 1]
  - "You Are My Sunshine" (Jimmie Davis/Charles Mitchell) [Take 1]
  - "Ring of Fire" (June Carter/Merle Kilgore) [Takes 1–3]
  - "Wanted Man" [Take 1]
  - "Guess Things Happen That Way" (Jack Clement) [Takes 1–5]
  - "Amen" [Takes 1–2]
  - "Just a Closer Walk with Thee" (Traditional) [Take 1]
  - "Blue Yodel No. 1 (T for Texas)" (Jimmie Rodgers) [Take 1]
  - "Blue Yodel No. 5 (It's Raining Here)" (Rodgers) [Take 1]

==== February 20, 1969 ====
- Studio A, Columbia Recording Studios, Nashville, Tennessee (1.45pm-4.45 pm, 6.00pm-10.30 pm)
  - "Lay Lady Lay" [Remake] [Overdub onto Take 5] – Released on Nashville Skyline

=== Self Portrait sessions, part 1 ===
==== April 24, 1969 ====
- Columbia Recording Studios, Nashville, Tennessee (6.00pm-9.00 pm, 10.00pm-1.00 am)
  - "Living the Blues" [Takes 1–3]
  - "Living the Blues" [Remake] [Takes 1–3] – Take 3 (with overdubs) released on Self Portrait
  - "Spanish is the Loving Tongue" (Charles Badger Clark) [Takes 1–7] – Take 7 (with overdubs) released on Dylan

==== April 26, 1969 ====
- Columbia Recording Studios, Nashville, Tennessee (6.00pm-9.00 pm, 10.00pm-1.00 am)
  - "Take Me As I Am (Or Let Me Go)" (Boudleaux Bryant) [Takes unknown] – Take unknown (with overdubs) released on Self Portrait
  - "(Now and Then There's) A Fool Such as I" (Bill Trader) [Takes unknown] – Take unknown (with overdubs) released on Dylan
  - "I Forgot More Than You'll Ever Know" (Cecil Null) [Takes unknown] – Take unknown (with overdubs) released on Self Portrait
  - "Let It Be Me" (Pierre Delanoë/Gilbert Bécaud/Manny Curtis) [Takes unknown] – Take unknown (with overdubs) released on Self Portrait
  - "Running" [Takes unknown]

==== May 3, 1969 ====
- Columbia Recording Studios, Nashville, Tennessee (4.00pm-7.00 pm, 7.00pm-10.00 pm)
  - "Take a Message to Mary" (Felice Bryant/Bryant) [Takes unknown] – Take unknown (with overdubs) released on Self Portrait
  - "Blue Moon" (Lorenz Hart/Richard Rodgers) [Takes unknown] – Take unknown (with overdubs) released on Self Portrait
  - "Ring of Fire" (June Carter/Merle Kilgore) [Remake] [Takes unknown]
  - "Folsom Prison Blues" (Johnny Cash) [Takes unknown]

=== Isle of Wight Festival concert ===
==== August 31, 1969 ====
- Woodside Bay, Isle of Wight, England (time unknown)
  - "She Belongs to Me" - Live recording released on Self Portrait; included on The Bootleg Series Vol. 10 – Another Self Portrait (1969–1971)
  - "I Threw It All Away" - Live recording released on The Bootleg Series Vol. 10 – Another Self Portrait (1969–1971)
  - "Maggie's Farm" - Live recording released on The Bootleg Series Vol. 10 – Another Self Portrait (1969–1971)
  - "Wild Mountain Thyme" (Traditional) – Live recording released on The Bootleg Series Vol. 10 – Another Self Portrait (1969–1971)
  - "It Ain't Me, Babe" - Live recording released on The Bootleg Series Vol. 10 – Another Self Portrait (1969–1971)
  - "To Ramona" - Live recording released on The Bootleg Series Vol. 10 – Another Self Portrait (1969–1971)
  - "Mr. Tambourine Man" - Live recording released on The Bootleg Series Vol. 10 – Another Self Portrait (1969–1971)
  - "I Dreamed I Saw St. Augustine" - Live recording released on The Bootleg Series Vol. 10 – Another Self Portrait (1969–1971)
  - "Lay Lady Lay" - Live recording released on The Bootleg Series Vol. 10 – Another Self Portrait (1969–1971)
  - "Highway 61 Revisited" - Live recording released on The Bootleg Series Vol. 10 – Another Self Portrait (1969–1971)
  - "One Too Many Mornings" - Live recording released on The Bootleg Series Vol. 10 – Another Self Portrait (1969–1971)
  - "I Pity the Poor Immigrant" - Live recording released on The Bootleg Series Vol. 10 – Another Self Portrait (1969–1971)
  - "Like a Rolling Stone" - Live recording released on Self Portrait; included on The Bootleg Series Vol. 10 – Another Self Portrait (1969–1971)
  - "I'll Be Your Baby Tonight" - Live recording released on The Bootleg Series Vol. 10 – Another Self Portrait (1969–1971)
  - "Quinn the Eskimo (The Mighty Quinn)" - Live recording released on Self Portrait; included on The Bootleg Series Vol. 10 – Another Self Portrait (1969–1971)
  - "Minstrel Boy" - Live recording released on Self Portrait; included on The Bootleg Series Vol. 10 – Another Self Portrait (1969–1971)
  - "Rainy Day Women#12 & 35" - Live recording released on The Bootleg Series Vol. 10 – Another Self Portrait (1969–1971)

== 1970 ==
=== Self Portrait sessions ===
==== March 3, 1970 ====
- Studio B, Columbia Recording Studios, New York City (2.30pm-6.30 pm)
  - "Pretty Saro" [Takes 1–6] – Take 1 or 4 released on The Bootleg Series Vol. 10 – Another Self Portrait (1969–1971)
  - "Little Sadie" (Traditional) [Take 1]
    - Take 1 – Released on The Bootleg Series Vol. 10 – Another Self Portrait (1969–1971)
    - Take 1 (with overdubs) – Released on Self Portrait
  - "Dock of the Bay" [Take 1]
  - "Went to See the Gypsy"
    - [Take 1] – Take 1 released on The Bootleg Series Vol. 10 – Another Self Portrait (1969–1971)
    - Takes 2 & 3 released on Bob Dylan 1970
  - "Little Sadie" (re-titled "In Search of Little Sadie") (Traditional) [Take 2]
    - Take 2 – Released on The Bootleg Series Vol. 10 – Another Self Portrait (1969–1971)
    - Take 2 (with overdubs) – Released on Self Portrait
  - "Belle Isle" (Traditional) [Take 1]
    - Take 1 – Released on The Bootleg Series Vol. 10 – Another Self Portrait (1969–1971)
    - Take 1 (with overdubs) – Released on Self Portrait
  - "Universal Soldier" [Take 1] [Take 1] – Take 1 released on Bob Dyl1n 1970
  - "Copper Kettle" (Alfred Frank Beddoe) [Take 1]
    - Take 1 – Released on The Bootleg Series Vol. 10 – Another Self Portrait (1969–1971)
    - Take 1 (with overdubs) – Released on Self Portrait
  - "When a Fellow's Out of a Job" [Take 1]
  - "These Hands" [Take 1] – Take 1 released on The Bootleg Series Vol. 10 – Another Self Portrait (1969–1971)
  - "It Hurts Me Too" (Tampa Red) [Take 1] – Take 1 (with overdubs) released on Self Portrait
  - "The Boxer" (Paul Simon) [Take 1] – Take 1 (with overdubs) released on Self Portrait
  - "Spanish is the Loving Tongue" (Charles Badger Clark) [Remake] [Take 1] – Take 1 released on Bob Dylan 1970
  - "Unknown" [Take 1]
  - "Woogie Boogie"
    - Take 1 – Released on Bob Dylan 1970
    - Take 1 (with overdubs) released on Self Portrait

==== March 4, 1970 ====
- Studio B, Columbia Recording Studios, New York City (2.30pm-5.30 pm, 7.00pm-10.00 pm, 11.30pm-2.30 am)
  - "Went to See the Gyspy" [Remake] [Takes 1–5]
  - "Thirsty Boots" (Eric Andersen) [Takes 1–4] – Take 2 or 4 released on The Bootleg Series Vol. 10 – Another Self Portrait (1969–1971)
  - "Tattle O-Day" [Take 1] – Take 1 released on The Bootleg Series Vol. 10 – Another Self Portrait (1969–1971)
  - "Railroad Bill" (Traditional) [Take 1] – Take 1 released on The Bootleg Series Vol. 10 – Another Self Portrait (1969–1971)
  - "House Carpenter" (Traditional) [Remake] [Take 1] – Take 1 released on The Bootleg Series Vol. 10 – Another Self Portrait (1969–1971)
  - "This Evening So Soon" [Take 1] – Take 1 released on The Bootleg Series Vol. 10 – Another Self Portrait (1969–1971)
  - "Days of 49" (Alan Lomax/John Lomax/Frank Warner) [Take 1]
    - Take 1 – Released on The Bootleg Series Vol. 10 – Another Self Portrait (1969–1971)
    - Take 1 (with overdubs) – Released on Self Portrait
  - "Annie's Going to Sing Her Song" (Tom Paxton) [Take 1] – Take 1 released on The Bootleg Series Vol. 10 – Another Self Portrait (1969–1971)
  - "Early Morning Rain" (Gordon Lightfoot) [Take 1] – Take 1 (with overdubs) released on Self Portrait
  - "Wigwam" [Take 1]
    - Take 1 – Released on The Bootleg Series Vol. 10 – Another Self Portrait (1969–1971)
    - Take 1 (with overdubs) – Released on Self Portrait
  - "Time Passes Slowly" [Take 1]

==== March 5, 1970 ====
- Columbia Recording Studios, New York City (4.30pm-8.00 pm)
  - "Alberta" (Traditional) [Takes 1–2] – Take 2 (re-titled "Alberta #2") (with overdubs) released on Self Portrait
  - "Little Moses" (Bert Williams/Earle C. Jones) [Take 1]
  - "Alberta" (Traditional) [Takes 3–4]
    - Take 3 (re-titled "Alberta #3") – Released on The Bootleg Series Vol. 10 – Another Self Portrait (1969–1971)
    - Take 4 (re-titled "Alberta #1") (with overdubs) – Released on Self Portrait
  - "Come a Little Bit Closer" [Take unnumbered]
  - "Come All Ye Fair and Tender Ladies" (Traditional) [Take 1]
  - "My Previous Life" [Takes 1–2 and Take unnumbered)
  - "Gotta Travel On" (Paul Clayton/Larry Ehrlich/David Lazar/Tom Six) [Take 1] – Take 1 (with overdubs) released on Self Portrait
  - "Went to See the Gyspy" [Remake] [Take 6]
  - "Time Passes Slowly" [2 Takes unnumbered and Take 2]
  - "Come a Little Bit Closer" [Take unnumbered and Take 1]
  - "All the Tired Horses" [Take 1]
    - Take 1 – Released on The Bootleg Series Vol. 10 – Another Self Portrait (1969–1971)
    - Take 1 (with overdubs) – Released on Self Portrait

==== March 11, 1970 ====
- Columbia Recording Studios, Nashville, Tennessee (10.00am-1.30 pm, 2.00pm-5.00 pm)
  - "Alberta #2" or "Alberta #1"(Traditional) [Overdub onto Take unknown]
  - "All the Tired Horses" [Overdub onto Take 1]
  - "Days of 49" (Lomax/Lomax/Warner) [Overdub onto Take 1] – Released on Self Portrait
  - "Little Sadie" or "In Search of Little Sadie" (Traditional) [Overdub onto Take unknown]

==== March 12, 1970 ====
- Columbia Recording Studios, Nashville, Tennessee (10.00am-1.00 pm)
  - "Bellie Isle" (Traditional) [Overdub onto Take 1]
  - "The Boxer" (Simon) [Overdub onto Take 1]

==== March 13, 1970 ====
- Columbia Recording Studios, Nashville, Tennessee (10.00am-2.00 pm, 2.00pm-5.00 pm)
  - "Early Morning Rain" (Lightfoot) [Overdub onto Take 1]
  - "Woogie Boogie" [Overdub onto Take 1]
  - "Copper Kettle" (Beddoe) [Overdub onto Take 1]
  - "Gotta Travel On" (Clayton/Ehrlich/Lazar/Six) [Overdub onto Take 1] – Released on Self Portrait

==== March 17, 1970 ====
- Columbia Recording Studios, Nashville, Tennessee (9.00am-1.00 pm, 10.00pm-1.30 am)
  - "Early Morning Rain" (Lightfoot) [Overdub onto Take 1] – Released on Self Portrait
  - "Woogie Boogie" [Overdub onto Take 1] – Released on Self Portrait
  - "Copper Kettle" (Beddoe) [Overdub onto Take 1]
  - "Belle Isle" (Traditional) [Overdub onto Take 1]
  - "All the Tired Horses" [Overdub onto Take 1]

==== March 30, 1970 ====
- Columbia Recording Studios, Nashville, Tennessee (7.00am-10.00 am)
  - "Copper Kettle" (Beddoe) [Overdub onto Take 1] – Released on Self Portrait
  - "Belle Isle" (Traditional) [Overdub onto Take 1] – Released on Self Portrait
  - "All the Tired Horses" [Overdub onto Take 1] – Released on Self Portrait

==== April 2, 1970 ====
- Columbia Recording Studios, Nashville, Tennessee (6.00pm-9.00 pm, 10.00pm-1.00 am)
  - "The Boxer" (Simon) [Overdub onto Take 1] – released on Self Portrait
  - "Little Sadie" or "In Search of Little Sadie" (Traditional) [Overdub onto Take unknown] – Released on Self Portrait

==== April 3, 1970 ====
- Columbia Recording Studios, Nashville, Tennessee (10.00am-1.00 pm)
  - "Alberta #2" or "Alberta #1"(Traditional) [Overdub onto Take unknown] – Released on Self Portrait

=== New Morning sessions ===
==== May 1, 1970 ====
- Columbia Studio B, New York City
  - "Sign on the Window" [Takes 1–5] – Take 5 released on New Morning
  - "If Not for You" [Takes 1–2]
  - "Time Passes Slowly" [Remake] [Takes 1–4] – Take 2 released on The Bootleg Series Vol. 10 – Another Self Portrait (1969–1971)
  - "Working on a Guru" [Take 1] – Take 1 released on The Bootleg Series Vol. 10 – Another Self Portrait (1969–1971)
  - "Went to See the Gypsy" [Remake 2] [Take 1]
  - "If Not for You" [Takes 3–5] – Take 4 released on The Bootleg Series Volumes 1-3 (Rare & Unreleased) 1961–1991
  - "Song to Woody" [Remake] [Take 1]
  - "Mama, You Been on My Mind" [Remake] [Take 1]
  - "Don't Think Twice, It's All Right" [Remake] [Take 1]
  - "Yesterday" (John Lennon/Paul McCartney) [Take 1]
  - "Just Like Tom Thumb's Blues" [Remake] [Take 1]
  - "Da Doo Ron Ron" (Jeff Barry/Ellie Greenwich/Phil Spector) [Take 1]
  - "One Too Many Mornings" [Remake 4] [Takes 1–2]
  - "Ghost Riders in the Sky" (Stan Jones) [Take 1]
  - "Cupid" (Sam Cooke) [Take 1]
  - "All I Have to Do Is Dream" (Felice Bryant/Boudleaux Bryant) [Take 1]
  - "Gates of Eden" [Remake] [Take 1]
  - "I Threw It All Away" [Remake] [Take 1]
  - "I Don't Believe You (She Acts Like We Never Have Met)" [Remake] [Take 1]
  - "Matchbox" (Carl Perkins) [Remake] [Take 1]
  - "Your True Love" (Perkins) [Take 1]
  - "Las Vegas Blues" [Take 1]
  - "Fishing Blues" (Henry Thomas) [Take 1]
  - "Honey, Just Allow Me One More Chance" (Dylan/Thomas) [Remake] [Take 1]
  - "Rainy Day Women#12 & 35" [Remake] [Take 1]
  - "It Ain't Me, Babe" [Remake] [Take 1]

==== June 1, 1970 ====
- Studio E, Columbia Recording Studios, New York City
  - "Alligator Man" [Takes 1–5]
  - "The Ballad of Ira Hayes" (Peter LaFarge) [Take 1] – Take 1 (with overdubs) released on Dylan
  - "Oh Lonesome Me" (Don Gibson) [Takes 1–3]
  - "Alligator Man" [Remake] [Take 1]
  - "Mary Ann" (Traditional) [Takes 1–7]
  - "Sarah Jane" (Traditional) [Takes 1–7] – Take 4 or 7 (with overdubs) released on Dylan

==== June 2, 1970 ====
- Studio E, Columbia Recording Studios, New York City
  - "Spanish is the Loving Tongue" (Clark) [Remake 2] [Takes 1–2] – Take 2 released as B-side to "Watching the River Flow" single; included on Masterpieces
  - "Mary Ann" (Traditional) [Remake] [Take 1]
  - "Mr. Bojangles" (Jerry Jeff Walker) [Take 1]
  - "If Not for You" [Remake] [Take 1]
  - "Mr. Bojangles" (Walker) [Takes 2–6] – Take 6 (with overdubs) released on Dylan
  - "If Not for You" [Remake] [Take 2] – Take 2 released on The Bootleg Series Vol. 10 – Another Self Portrait (1969–1971)
  - "Mary Ann" (Traditional) [Remake 2] [Takes 1–8] – Take 6 (with overdubs) released on Dylan
  - "Time Passes Slowly" [Remake 2] [Takes 1–14] – Take 14 released on The Bootleg Series Vol. 10 – Another Self Portrait (1969–1971)

==== June 3, 1970 ====
- Studio E, Columbia Recording Studios, New York City
  - "Jamaica Farewell" (Lord Burgess) [Take 1]
  - "Can't Help Falling in Love" (George Weiss/Hugo Peretti/Luigi Creatore) [Takes 1–3] – Take 3 (with overdubs) released on Dylan
  - "Long Black Veil" (Danny Dill/Marijohn Wilkin [Take 1]
  - "Lily of the West" (Traditional) [Takes 1–2] – Take 2 (with overdubs) released on Dylan
  - "One More Weekend" [Takes 1–2] – Take 2 released on New Morning

==== June 4, 1970 ====
- Studio E, Columbia Recording Studios, New York City
  - "Bring Me a Little Water" [Takes 1–2] – Take 1 or 2 released on The Bootleg Series Vol. 10 – Another Self Portrait (1969–1971)
  - "Three Angels" [Takes 1–3] – Take 3 released on New Morning
  - "Tomorrow Is a Long Time" [Takes 1–3]
  - "Big Yellow Taxi" (Joni Mitchell) [Takes 1–3]
  - "Big Yellow Taxi" (Mitchell) [Insert] [Takes 1–2, 4–5]
    - Edit of Takes 2 and 4 (with overdubs) – Released on Dylan
  - "New Morning" [Takes 1–3]
    - Take 3 – Released on New Morning
    - Take 3 (with overdubs) – Released on The Bootleg Series Vol. 10 – Another Self Portrait (1969–1971)

==== June 5, 1970 ====
- Studio E, Columbia Recording Studios, New York City
  - "If Dogs Run Free" [Takes 1–3]
    - Take 1 – Released on The Bootleg Series Vol. 10 – Another Self Portrait (1969–1971)
    - Take 3 – Released on New Morning
  - "Went to See the Gypsy" [Remake 3] [Takes 1–4]
    - Take 1 or 2 – Released on The Bootleg Series Vol. 10 – Another Self Portrait (1969–1971)
    - Take 4 – Released on New Morning
  - "What It's All About" [Takes 1–8]
  - "Winterlude" [Takes 1–5] – Take 4 released on New Morning
  - "I Forgot to Remember" [Takes 1–2]
  - "The Man in Me" [Takes 1–2] – Take 1 or 2 released on New Morning
  - "Ahooah (Owau)" [Take 1]
  - "Father of Night" [Takes 1–11] – Take 11 released on New Morning
  - "Lily of the West" (Traditional) [Remake] [Takes 1–4]

==== June 30, 1970 ====
- Studio E, Columbia Recording Studios, New York City
  - "Blowin' in the Wind" [Remake] [Takes 1–15]

==== July 13, 1970 ====
- Studio E, Columbia Recording Studios, New York City
  - "New Morning" [Overdubs] [Takes unknown] – Released on The Bootleg Series Vol. 10 – Another Self Portrait (1969–1971)
  - "Sign on the Window" [Overdubs] [Takes unknown] – Released on The Bootleg Series Vol. 10 – Another Self Portrait (1969–1971)

==== July 23, 1970 ====
- Studio E, Columbia Recording Studios, New York City
  - "Went to See the Gypsy" [Overdubs] [Takes unknown]
  - "Spanish is the Loving Tongue" (Clark) [Overdubs] [Takes unknown]
  - "If Not for You" [Remake] [Overdubs] [Takes unknown]

==== August 12, 1970 ====
- Studio E, Columbia Recording Studios, New York City
  - "If Not for You" [Remake 2] [Takes 1–5] – Take 5 released on New Morning
  - "Time Passes Slowly" [Remake 3] [Takes 1–5] – Take 3 released on New Morning
  - "Day of the Locusts" [Takes 1–7] – Take 7 released on New Morning

== 1971 ==
=== "Watching the River Flow" sessions ===
==== March 16–19, 1971 ====
- Blue Rock Studios, New York City (time unknown)
  - "When I Paint My Masterpiece" [Takes 1–11]
    - Take 4 (probably) – Released on The Bootleg Series Vol. 10 – Another Self Portrait (1969–1971)
    - Take 11 (probably) – Released on Bob Dylan's Greatest Hits Vol. II
  - "Watching the River Flow" [Takes unknown] – Take unknown released as a single, included on Bob Dylan's Greatest Hits Vol. II

=== Bob Dylan's Greatest Hits, Vol. II session ===
==== September 24, 1971 ====
- Studio B, Columbia Recording Studios, New York City (time unknown)
  - "Only a Hobo" [Remake] [Takes 1–5] – Take 2, 3, 4 or 5 released on The Bootleg Series Vol. 10 – Another Self Portrait (1969–1971)
  - "You Ain't Goin' Nowhere" [Takes 1–6] – Take 6 released on Bob Dylan's Greatest Hits Vol. II
  - "Down in the Flood" [Takes 1–2] – Take 1 or 2 released on Bob Dylan's Greatest Hits Vol. II
  - "I Shall Be Released" [Takes 1–4] – Take 4 released on Bob Dylan's Greatest Hits Vol. II

=== "George Jackson" session ===
==== November 4, 1971 ====
- Studio B, Columbia Recording Studios, New York City (10.00am-1.00 pm, 2.00pm-6.00 pm)
  - "Wallflower" [Take 4]
    - Take 1, 2 or 3 – Released on Bootleg Series 10
    - Take 4 – Released on The Bootleg Series Volumes 1–3 (Rare & Unreleased) 1961–1991
  - "George Jackson (Acoustic version)" [Take 9] – Take 9 released as the B-side to "George Jackson (Big Band version)"
  - "George Jackson (Big Band version)" [Take 13] – Take 12 released as a single; included on Masterpieces

== 1973 ==
=== Pat Garrett and Billy the Kid sessions ===
==== January 20, 1973 ====
- CBS Discos Studios, Mexico City, Mexico (time unknown)
  - "Billy" [Takes 1–5] – Take 5 (re-titled "Billy 4") released on Pat Garrett & Billy the Kid
  - "Turkey #1" [Take 1]
  - "Turkey #2" [Takes 1–2]
  - "Billy" [Take 6]
  - "Billy Surrenders" [Takes 1–2] – Take 2 included in the film Pat Garrett and Billy the Kid
  - "And He's Killing Me Too" [Takes 1–4]
  - "Goodbye Holly" [Take 1]
  - "Peco's Blues" [Takes 1–2]

==== February 1973 (1st session) ====
- Burbank Studios, Burbank, California (time unknown)
  - "Billy" [Take 7]
  - "Knockin' on Heaven's Door" [Takes 1–3] – Take 1 released on Pat Garrett & Billy the Kid
  - "Sweet Amarillo" (Donna Weiss) [Take 1]
  - "Knockin' on Heaven's Door" [Take 4]
  - "Final Theme" [Take 1]
  - "Rock Me, Mama" [Takes 1–2]
  - "Billy" [Takes 8–10] – Take 10 released on Pat Garrett & Billy the Kid
  - "Instrumental" [Takes 1–2]
  - "Final Theme" [Takes 2–3]
  - "Ride Billy" [Take 1]
  - "Final Theme" [Take 4] – Take 4 released on Pat Garrett & Billy the Kid
  - "Bunkhouse Theme" [Take 1] – Take 1 released on Pat Garrett & Billy the Kid

==== February 1973 (2nd session) ====
- Burbank Studios, Burbank, California (time unknown)
  - "Main Title Theme (Billy)" [Take 1] – Take 1 released on Pat Garrett & Billy the Kid
  - "Cantina Theme (Workin' for the Law)" [Takes 1–2] – Take 2 released on Pat Garrett & Billy the Kid
  - "Billy" [Takes 11–14] – Take 11 released on Pat Garrett & Billy the Kid
  - "River Theme" [Takes 1–3] – Take 1 released on Pat Garrett & Billy the Kid
  - "Turkey Chase" [Take 1] – Take 1 released on Pat Garrett & Billy the Kid

=== Planet Waves demo recordings ===
==== June 1973 ====
- Ram's Horn Music Publisher's Office, New York City (time unknown)
  - "Forever Young" - Demo recording released on Biograph
  - "Nobody 'Cept You"
  - "Never Say Goodbye"

=== Planet Waves sessions ===
==== November 2, 1973 ====
- Village Recorded, Santa Monica, California (12.00pm-3.00 pm, 3.30pm-6.30 pm, 7.00pm-10.00 pm)
  - "Instrumental" [Take 1]
  - "Never Say Goodbye" [Takes 1–7] – Take 7 released on Planet Waves
  - "Crosswind Jamboree" [Take 1]
  - "House of the Risin' Sun" (Traditional) [Remake] [Takes 1–2]
  - "Nobody 'Cept You" [Take 1] – Take 1 released on The Bootleg Series Volumes 1-3 (Rare & Unreleased) 1961-1991
  - "Crosswind Jamboree" [Remake] [Take 1]
  - "Forever Young" [Take 1]

==== November 5, 1973 ====
- Village Recorded, Santa Monica, California (1.00pm-4.00 pm, 5.00pm-8.00 pm, 8.30pm-11.30 pm)
  - "You Angel You" [Takes 1–4] – Take 4 released on Planet Waves
  - "Going, Going, Gone" [Takes 1–5] – Take 5 released on Planet Waves
  - "Forever Young" [Remake] [Takes 1–2]
  - "Nobody 'Cept You" [Remake] [Take 1]
  - "Something There Is About You" [Take 1]
  - "Tough Mama" [Takes 1–2]
  - "Hazel" [Take 1]

==== November 6, 1973 ====
- Village Recorded, Santa Monica, California (12.00pm-5.00 pm, 5.30pm-10.30 pm)
  - "On a Night Like This" [Takes 1–7]
  - "Hazel" [Remake] [Takes 1–5]
  - "Short Jam" [Take 1]
  - "Hazel" [Remake] [Takes 6–8] – Take 8 released on Planet Waves
  - "Tough Mama" [Remake] [Takes 1–7] – Take 5 released on Planet Waves
  - "Something There Is About You" [Remake] [Takes 1–3] – Take 3 released on Planet Waves

==== November 8, 1973 ====
- Village Recorded, Santa Monica, California (1.00pm-6.00 pm, 7.00pm-10.00 pm)
  - "Going, Going, Gone" [Remake] [Takes 1–3]
  - "On a Night Like This" [Remake] [Take 1]
  - "On a Night Like This" [Remake 2] [Takes 1–2] – Take 2 released on Planet Waves
  - "Forever Young" [Remake 2] [Takes 1–3]
  - "Forever Young" [Remake 3] [Take 3]
  - "Forever Young" [Remake 4] [Take 3] – Take 3 released on Planet Waves

==== November 9, 1973 ====
- Village Recorded, Santa Monica, California (time unknown)
  - "Wedding Song" [Take 1] – Take 1 released on Planet Waves
  - "Adalita" [Takes 1–2]
  - "Wedding Song" [Remake] [Take 1]

==== November 13, 1973 ====
- Village Recorded, Santa Monica, California (time unknown)
  - "Forever Young" [Remake 5] [Takes 1–5] – Take 2 released on Planet Waves
  - "Dirge" [Take 1] – Take 1 released on Planet Waves

== 1974 ==
=== Tour '74 ===
==== January 30, 1974 ====
- Madison Square Garden, New York City (time unknown)
  - "Knockin' on Heaven's Door" - Live recording released on Before the Flood

==== January 31, 1974 ====
- Madison Square Garden, New York City (evening)
  - "Highway 61 Revisited" - Live recording released on The Band: A Musical History

==== February 13, 1974 ====
- The Forum, Los Angeles, California (time unknown)
  - "Lay Lady Lay" - Live recording released on Before the Flood
  - "Rainy Day Women#12 & 35" - Live recording released on Before the Flood; included on The Band: A Musical History
  - "The Weight" (Robbie Robertson) – Live recording (without Bob Dylan) released on Before the Flood
  - "Like a Rolling Stone" - Live recording released on Before the Flood
  - "Blowin' in the Wind" - Live recording (partly) released on Before the Flood

==== February 14, 1974 ====
- The Forum, Los Angeles, California (afternoon)
  - "Ballad of a Thin Man" - Live recording released on Before the Flood
  - "All Along the Watchtower" - Live recording released on Before the Flood; included on Biograph
  - "Blowin' in the Wind" - Live recording (partly) released on Before the Flood
- The Forum, Los Angeles, California (evening)
  - "Most Likely You Go Your Way (And I'll Go Mine)" - Live recording released on Before the Flood; included on Biograph
  - "It Ain't Me, Babe" - Live recording released on Before the Flood
  - "Stage Fright" (Robertson) – Live recording (without Bob Dylan) released on Before the Flood
  - "The Night They Drove Old Dixie Down" (Robertson) – Live recording (without Bob Dylan) released on Before the Flood
  - "When You Awake" (Richard Manuel/Robertson) – Live recording (without Bob Dylan) released on Before the Flood
  - "Up on Cripple Creek" (Robertson) – Live recording (without Bob Dylan) released on Before the Flood
  - "Just Like a Woman" - Live recording released on Before the Flood
  - "Don't Think Twice, It's All Right" - Live recording released on Before the Flood
  - "It's Alright, Ma (I'm Only Bleeding)" - Live recording released on Before the Flood
  - "Endless Highway" (Robertson) – Live recording (without Bob Dylan) released on Before the Flood
  - "The Shape I'm In" (Robertson) – Live recording (without Bob Dylan) released on Before the Flood
  - "Highway 61 Revisited" - Live recording released on Before the Flood

=== Blood on the Tracks sessions ===
==== September 16, 1974 ====
- Studio A, A & R Recording, New York City (6.00pm-12.00 am)
  - "If You See Her, Say Hello" [Takes 1–2] – Take 2 released on The Bootleg Series Volumes 1–3 (Rare & Unreleased) 1961–1991
  - "You're a Big Girl Now" [Takes 1–2]
  - "Simple Twist of Fate" [Takes 1–2]
  - "You're a Big Girl Now" [Take 3]
  - "Up to Me" [Take 1]
  - "Lily, Rosemary and the Jack of Hearts" [Take 1]
  - "Simple Twist of Fate" [Remake] [Takes 1–3]
  - "Call Letter Blues" [Takes 1–3] – Take 3 released on The Bootleg Series Volumes 1–3 (Rare & Unreleased) 1961–1991
  - "Idiot Wind" [Takes 1–6]
  - "You're Gonna Make Me Lonesome When You Go" [Takes 1–8]
  - "Tangled Up in Blue" [Take 1] – Take 1 released on The Bootleg Series Volumes 1–3 (Rare & Unreleased) 1961–1991

==== September 17, 1974 ====
- Studio A, A & R Recording, New York City (7.00pm-1.00 am)
  - "You're a Big Girl Now" [Remake] [Takes 1–2] – Take 2 released on Biograph
  - "Tangled Up in Blue" [Remake] [Take 1]
  - "Unidentified Song" [Take 1]
  - "Blues" [Take 1]
  - "You're Gonna Make Me Lonesome When You Go" [Remake] [Take 1]
  - "Shelter from the Storm" [Takes 1–2]
  - "Buckets of Rain" [Take 1]
  - "Tangled Up in Blue" [Remake] [Take 2]
  - "Buckets of Rain" [Take 2]
  - "Shelter from the Storm" [Takes 2–4] – Take 4 released on Blood on the Tracks
  - "You're Gonna Make Me Lonesome When You Go" [Remake 2] [Takes 1–2] – Take 2 released on Blood on the Tracks

==== September 18, 1974 ====
- Studio A, A & R Recording, New York City (4.00pm-8.00 pm)
  - "Buckets of Rain" [Remake] [Takes 1–2]

==== September 19, 1974 ====
- Studio A, A & R Recording, New York City (7.00pm-3.00 am)
  - "Up to Me" [Remake] [Takes 1–2]
  - "Buckets of Rain" [Remake 2] [Takes 1–4] – Take 4 released on Blood on the Tracks
  - "If You See Her, Say Hello" [Remake] [Take 1]
  - "Up to Me" [Remake 2] [Takes 1–3]
  - "Meet Me in the Morning" [Takes 1–2]
  - "Buckets of Rain" [Remake 2] [Take unnumbered]
  - "Tangled Up in Blue" [Remake 2] [Takes 1–3]
  - "Simple Twist of Fate" [Remake] [Takes 1–3] – Take 3 released on Blood on the Tracks
  - "Up to Me" [Remake 3] [Takes 1–2] – Take 2 released on Biograph
  - "Idiot Wind" [Remake] [Takes 1–4] – Take 4 released on The Bootleg Series Volumes 1–3 (Rare & Unreleased) 1961–1991

==== October 8, 1974 ====
- Studio A, A & R Recording, New York City (10.00am-2.30 pm)
  - "Idiot Wind" [Remake] [Overdub onto Take 4]

==== December 27, 1974 ====
- Sound 80, Minneapolis, Minnesota (time unknown)
  - "Idiot Wind" [Remake 2] [Takes unknown] – Take unknown released on Blood on the Tracks
  - "You're a Big Girl Now" [Remake 2] [Takes unknown] – Take unknown released on Blood on the Tracks

==== December 30, 1974 ====
- Sound 80, Minneapolis, Minnesota (time unknown)
  - "Tangled Up in Blue" [Remake 3] [Takes unknown] – Take unknown released on Blood on the Tracks
  - "Lily, Rosemary and the Jack of Hearts" [Remake] [Takes unknown] – Take unknown released on Blood on the Tracks
  - "If You See Her, Say Hello" [Remake 2] [Takes unknown] – Take unknown released on Blood on the Tracks

== 1975 ==
=== The Basement Tapes sessions ===
==== Winter-Spring 1975 ====
- Shangri-La Studios, Malibu, California (time unknown)
  - "Too Much of Nothing" [Overdubs onto Home recording Take 1] – Released on The Basement Tapes
  - "You Ain't Goin' Nowhere" [Overdubs onto Home recording Take 2] – Released on The Basement Tapes
  - "This Wheel's on Fire" (Rick Danko/Bob Dylan) [Overdubs onto Home recording] – Released on The Basement Tapes

=== Desire sessions ===
==== July 14, 1975 ====
- Studio E, Columbia Recording Studios, New York City (6.00pm-12.00 am)
  - "Rita Mae" (Bob Dylan/Jacques Levy) [Takes 1–3]
  - "Rita Mae" (Dylan/Levy) [Remake] [Take 3]
  - "Rita Mae" (Dylan/Levy) [Remake 2] [Take 3–4]
  - "Rita Mae" (Dylan/Levy) [Remake 3] [Takes 4–5]
  - "Joey" (Dylan/Levy) [Takes 1–2]
  - "Joey" (Dylan/Levy) [Insert] [Takes unnumbered]
  - "Joey" (Dylan/Levy) [Insert] [Takes 1–2]
  - "Joey" (Dylan/Levy) [Remake] [Takes 3–7]

==== July 28, 1975 ====
- Studio E, Columbia Recording Studios, New York City (7.00pm-4.00 am)
  - "Romance in Durango" (Dylan/Levy) [Take 1]
  - "Money Blues" (Dylan/Levy) [Take 1]
  - "One More Cup of Coffee (Valley Below)" [Take 1]
  - "Romance in Durango" (Dylan/Levy) [Take 2] – Take 2 released on Desire
  - "Oh, Sister" (Dylan/Levy) [Take 1]
  - "Catfish" (Dylan/Levy) [Takes 1–2]
  - "Romance in Durango" (Dylan/Levy) [Takes 3–6]
  - "Catfish" (Dylan/Levy) [Take 3]
  - "Hurricane" (Dylan/Levy) [Takes 1–3]

==== July 29, 1975 ====
- Studio E, Columbia Recording Studios, New York City (7.00pm-3.00 am)
  - "Black Diamond Bay" (Dylan/Levy) [Take 1]
  - "Money Blues" (Dylan/Levy) [Remake] [Take 1]
  - "Black Diamond Bay" (Dylan/Levy) [Takes 2–12]
  - "Oh, Sister" (Dylan/Levy) [Remake] [Takes 1–8]
  - "Mozambique" (Dylan/Levy) [Takes 1–7]
  - "Catfish" (Dylan/Levy) [Remake] [Takes 1–2] – Take 1 or 2 released on The Bootleg Series Volumes 1-3 (Rare & Unreleased) 1961–1991

==== July 30, 1975 ====
- Studio E, Columbia Recording Studios, New York City (8.00pm-8.00 am)
  - "Golden Loom" [Takes 1–4] – Take 2 released on The Bootleg Series Volumes 1-3 (Rare & Unreleased) 1961–1991
  - "Oh, Sister" (Dylan/Levy) [Remake 2] [Takes 1–2] – Take 2 released on Desire
  - "Oh, Sister" (Dylan/Levy) [Remake 3] [Takes 2, 4–5]
  - "Isis" (Dylan/Levy) [Takes 1–2]
  - "Rita Mae" (Dylan/Levy) [Remake 4] [Take 1]
  - "One More Cup of Coffee (Valley Below)" [Remake] [Take 1] – Take 1 released on Desire
  - "One More Cup of Coffee (Valley Below)" [Reference] [Takes 1–2]
  - "Black Diamond Bay" (Dylan/Levy) [Remake] [Takes 1–5] – Take 4 released on Desire
  - "Mozambique" (Dylan/Levy) [Takes 1–4] – Take 4 released on Desire
  - "Hurricane" (Dylan/Levy) [Remake] [Take 1]
  - "Rita Mae" (Dylan/Levy) [Remake 5] [Takes 1–3] – Take 3 released as a single
  - "Joey" (Dylan/Levy) [Remake 2] [Take 1] – Take 1 (with overdubs) released on Desire
  - "Joey" (Dylan/Levy) [Insert] [Take 1]

==== July 31, 1975 ====
- Studio E, Columbia Recording Studios, New York City (8.00pm-4.00 am)
  - "Golden Loom" [Test] [Take unnumbered]
  - "Abandoned Love" [Takes 1–2] – Take 1 released on Biograph
  - "Town" [reference] [Takes 1–2]
  - "Sara" [Take 1]
  - "Sara" [Remake] [Takes 1–5] – Take 5 released on Desire
  - "Isis" (Dylan/Levy) [Remake] [Takes 1–2] – Take 2 released on Desire

==== August 11, 1975 ====
- Studio E, Columbia Recording Studios, New York City (7.00pm-3.00 am)
  - "Joey" (Dylan/Levy) [Remake 2] [Overdub onto Take 1] – Released on Desire

==== October 24, 1975 ====
- Studio E, Columbia Recording Studios, New York City (10.00pm-4.30 am)
  - "Hurricane" (Dylan/Levy) [Remake 2] [Takes 1–10]
    - Splice of Take 2 and 6 – Released on Desire

=== Rolling Thunder Revue ===
==== November 19, 1975 ====
- Memorial Auditorium, Worcester, Massachusetts (time unknown)
  - "Hurricane" (Dylan/Levy) – Live recording released on The Bootleg Series Vol. 5: Bob Dylan Live 1975, The Rolling Thunder Revue

==== November 20, 1975 ====
- Harvard Square Theatre, Cambridge, Massachusetts (time unknown)
  - "It Ain't Me, Babe" - Live recording released on The Bootleg Series Vol. 5: Bob Dylan Live 1975, The Rolling Thunder Revue
  - "Romance in Durango" (Dylan/Levy) – Live recording released on The Bootleg Series Vol. 5: Bob Dylan Live 1975, The Rolling Thunder Revue
  - "Mama, You Been on My Mind" - Live recording released on The Bootleg Series Vol. 5: Bob Dylan Live 1975, The Rolling Thunder Revue
  - "Simple Twist of Fate" - Live recording released on The Bootleg Series Vol. 5: Bob Dylan Live 1975, The Rolling Thunder Revue
  - "Knockin' on Heaven's Door" - Live recording released on The Bootleg Series Vol. 5: Bob Dylan Live 1975, The Rolling Thunder Revue

==== November 21, 1975 ====
- Boston Music Hall, Boston, Massachusetts (afternoon)
  - "I Shall Be Released" - Live recording released on The Bootleg Series Vol. 5: Bob Dylan Live 1975, The Rolling Thunder Revue
  - "Mr. Tambourine Man" - Live recording released on The Bootleg Series Vol. 5: Bob Dylan Live 1975, The Rolling Thunder Revue
- Boston Music Hall, Boston, Massachusetts (evening)
  - "The Lonesome Death of Hattie Carroll" - Live recording released on The Bootleg Series Vol. 5: Bob Dylan Live 1975, The Rolling Thunder Revue
  - "It Takes a Lot to Laugh, It Takes a Train to Cry" - Live recording released on The Bootleg Series Vol. 5: Bob Dylan Live 1975, The Rolling Thunder Revue
  - "Isis" (Dylan/Levy) – Live recording released on The Bootleg Series Vol. 5: Bob Dylan Live 1975, The Rolling Thunder Revue
  - "Blowin' in the Wind" - Live recording released on The Bootleg Series Vol. 5: Bob Dylan Live 1975, The Rolling Thunder Revue
  - "The Water is Wide" (Traditional) – Live recording released on The Bootleg Series Vol. 5: Bob Dylan Live 1975, The Rolling Thunder Revue
  - "Tangled Up in Blue" - Live recording released on The Bootleg Series Vol. 5: Bob Dylan Live 1975, The Rolling Thunder Revue
  - "Oh, Sister" (Dylan/Levy) – Live recording released on The Bootleg Series Vol. 5: Bob Dylan Live 1975, The Rolling Thunder Revue
  - "One More Cup of Coffee (Valley Below)" - Live recording released on The Bootleg Series Vol. 5: Bob Dylan Live 1975, The Rolling Thunder Revue
  - "Sara" - Live recording released on The Bootleg Series Vol. 5: Bob Dylan Live 1975, The Rolling Thunder Revue
  - "Just Like a Woman" - Live recording released on The Bootleg Series Vol. 5: Bob Dylan Live 1975, The Rolling Thunder Revue

==== December 4, 1975 ====
- Forum de Montreal, Montreal, Quebec (unknown)
  - "Tonight I'll Be Staying Here with You" - Live recording released on The Bootleg Series Vol. 5: Bob Dylan Live 1975, The Rolling Thunder Revue
  - "A Hard Rain's a-Gonna Fall" - Live recording released on The Bootleg Series Vol. 5: Bob Dylan Live 1975, The Rolling Thunder Revue
  - "Romance in Durango" (Dylan/Levy) – Live recording released on Biograph
  - "Isis" (Dylan/Levy) – Live recording released on Biograph
  - "It's All Over Now, Baby Blue" - Live recording released on The Bootleg Series Vol. 5: Bob Dylan Live 1975, The Rolling Thunder Revue
  - "Love Minus Zero/No Limit" - Live recording released on The Bootleg Series Vol. 5: Bob Dylan Live 1975, The Rolling Thunder Revue

== 1976 ==
=== Rolling Thunder Revue II ===
==== April 21, 1976 ====
- Curtis Hixon Convention Center, Tampa, Florida (time unknown)
  - "Seven Days" - Live recording released on The Bootleg Series Volumes 1-3 (Rare & Unreleased) 1961–1991

==== May 16, 1976 ====
- Tarrant County Convention Center Arena, Fort Worth, Texas (time unknown)
  - "I Threw It All Away" - Live recording released on Hard Rain
  - "Stuck Inside of Mobile with the Memphis Blues Again" - Live recording released on Hard Rain
  - "Oh, Sister" (Dylan/Jacques Levy) – Live recording released on Hard Rain
  - "Lay Lady Lay" - Live recording released on Hard Rain; included on Masterpieces

==== May 23, 1976 ====
- Hughes Stadium, Fort Collins, Colorado (time unknown)
  - "Maggie's Farm" - Live recording released on Hard Rain
  - "One Too Many Mornings" - Live recording released on Hard Rain
  - "Shelter from the Storm" - Live recording released on Hard Rain
  - "You're a Big Girl Now" - Live recording released on Hard Rain
  - "Idiot Wind" - Live recording released on Hard Rain; included on Masterpieces

=== The Last Waltz ===
==== November 25, 1976 ====
- Winterland, San Francisco, California (time unknown)
  - "Baby, Let Me Follow You Down" (Traditional) – Live recording released on The Last Waltz; included on The Last Waltz (2002 Rerelease)
  - "Hazel" - Live recording released on The Last Waltz (2002 Rerelease)
  - "I Don't Believe You (She Acts Like We Never Have Met)" - Live recording released on The Last Waltz; included on The Last Waltz (2002 Rerelease)
  - "Forever Young" - Live recording released on The Last Waltz; included on The Last Waltz (2002 Rerelease)
  - "Baby, Let Me Follow You Down" (Traditional) – Live recording released on The Last Waltz; included on The Last Waltz (2002 Rerelease)
  - "I Shall Be Released" - Live recording released on The Last Waltz; included on The Last Waltz (2002 Rerelease)

== 1978 ==
=== World Tour 1978 ===
==== February 28, 1978 ====
- Nippon Budokan Hall, Tokyo, Japan (time unknown)
  - "Shelter from the Storm" - Live recording released on Bob Dylan at Budokan
  - "Love Minus Zero/No Limit" - Live recording released on Bob Dylan at Budokan
  - "Simple Twist of Fate" - Live recording released on Bob Dylan at Budokan
  - "Don't Think Twice, It's All Right" - Live recording released on Bob Dylan at Budokan
  - "It's Alright, Ma (I'm Only Bleeding)" - Live recording released on Bob Dylan at Budokan
  - "Forever Young" - Live recording released on Bob Dylan at Budokan
  - "The Times They Are a-Changin'" - Live recording released on Bob Dylan at Budokan

==== March 1, 1978 ====
- Nippon Budokan Hall, Tokyo, Japan (time unknown)
  - "Mr. Tambourine Man" - Live recording released on Bob Dylan at Budokan
  - "Ballad of a Thin Man" - Live recording released on Bob Dylan at Budokan
  - "Maggie's Farm" - Live recording released on Bob Dylan at Budokan
  - "One More Cup of Coffee (Valley Below)" - Live recording released on Bob Dylan at Budokan
  - "Like a Rolling Stone" - Live recording released on Bob Dylan at Budokan
  - "I Shall Be Released" - Live recording released on Bob Dylan at Budokan
  - "Is Your Love in Vain?" - Live recording released on Bob Dylan at Budokan
  - "Going, Going, Gone" - Live recording released on Bob Dylan at Budokan
  - "Blowin' in the Wind" - Live recording released on Bob Dylan at Budokan
  - "Just Like a Woman" - Live recording released on Bob Dylan at Budokan
  - "Oh, Sister" (Bob Dylan/Jacques Levy)- Live recording released on Bob Dylan at Budokan
  - "All Along the Watchtower" - Live recording released on Bob Dylan at Budokan
  - "I Want You" - Live recording released on Bob Dylan at Budokan
  - "All I Really Want to Do" - Live recording released on Bob Dylan at Budokan
  - "Knockin' on Heaven's Door" - Live recording released on Bob Dylan at Budokan

=== Street-Legal sessions ===
==== April 25, 1978 ====
- Rundown Studios, Santa Monica, California (6.00pm-7.45 pm, 8.30pm-10.30 pm)
  - "Changing of the Guards" [Takes unknown]

==== April 26, 1978 ====
- Rundown Studios, Santa Monica, California (4.00pm-11.10 pm)
  - "Señor (Tales of Yankee Power)" [Takes unknown]
  - "Is Your Love in Vain?" [Takes unknown]
  - "New Pony" [Takes unknown]
  - "We Better Talk This Over" [Takes 1–3] – Take 6 (probably) released on Street-Legal
  - "Where Are You Tonight? (Journey Through Dark Heat)" [Takes 1–3]
  - "True Love Tends to Forget" [Takes 1–4]

==== April 27, 1978 ====
- Rundown Studios, Santa Monica, California (10.00pm-1.00 am)
  - "No Time to Think" [Takes unknown] – Take unknown (probably) released on Street-Legal
  - "Where Are You Tonight? (Journey Through Dark Heat)" [Takes unknown] – Take unknown (probably) released on Street-Legal
  - "True Love Tends to Forget" [Takes unknown] – Take unknown (probably) released on Street-Legal
  - "Changing of the Guards" [Takes unknown] – Take unknown (probably) released on Street-Legal

==== April 28, 1978 ====
- Rundown Studios, Santa Monica, California (5.30pm-7.30 pm, 7.30pm-8.00 pm, 8.45pm-9.05 pm, 9.10pm-?)
  - "Baby, Stop Crying" Takes unknown] – Take unknown (probably) (with overdubs) released on Street-Legal
  - "Is Your Love in Vain?" [Takes unknown] – Take unknown (probably) released on Street-Legal
  - "New Pony" [Takes unknown]
  - "Señor (Tales of Yankee Power)" [Takes unknown] – Take unknown (probably) released on Street-Legal

==== May 1, 1978 ====
- Rundown Studios, Santa Monica, California (7.00pm-?, 7.30pm-?, 7.45pm-?, 7.50pm-?)
  - "Walk Out in the Rain" (Bob Dylan/Helena Springs) [Takes unknown]
  - "Coming from the Heart (The Road is Long)" (Dylan/Springs) [Takes unknown]
  - "Stop Now" (Dylan/Springs) [Takes unknown]
  - "New Pony" [Takes unknown] – Take unknown (probably) (with overdubs) released on Street-Legal

==== May 2, 1978 ====
- Rundown Studios, Santa Monica, California (4.00pm-6.00 pm)
  - "Baby, Stop Crying" [Overdub onto Take unknown] – Released on Street-Legal

==== May 3, 1978 ====
- Rundown Studios, Santa Monica, California (time unknown)
  - "New Pony" [Overdub onto Take unknown] – Released on Street-Legal

== 1979 ==
=== Slow Train Coming sessions ===
==== April 30, 1979 ====
- Music Shoals Sound Studio, Sheffield, Alabama (12.00pm-3.00 pm, 4.00pm-7.00 pm)
  - "Trouble in Mind" [Take unnumbered]
  - "Trouble in Mind" [Take 1]
  - "Trouble in Mind" [Remake] [Takes 1–6] – Take 5 (with overdubs) released as the B-side to "Gotta Serve Somebody"

==== May 1, 1979 ====
- Music Shoals Sound Studio, Sheffield, Alabama (12.00pm-3.00 pm, 4.00pm-7.00 pm)
  - "Precious Angel" [Take unnumbered] – Take unnumbered (with overdubs) released on Slow Train Coming
  - "He Ain't No Man Righteous, No Not One" [Takes 1–5]
  - "He Ain't No Man Righteous, No Not One" [Take unnumbered]
  - "He Ain't No Man Righteous, No Not One" [Takes 6–7]
  - "He Ain't No Man Righteous, No Not One" [Take unnumbered]
  - "He Ain't No Man Righteous, No Not One" [Take 8]

==== May 2, 1979 ====
- Music Shoals Sound Studio, Sheffield, Alabama (12.00pm-3.00 pm, 4.00pm-7.00 pm)
  - "When You Gonna Wake Up" [3 Takes unnumbered] – Take unnumbered 3 (with overdubs) released on Slow Train Coming
  - "Gonna Change My Way of Thinking" [Take 1] – Take 1 (with overdubs) released on Slow Train Coming
  - "Ye Shall Be Changed" [Take unnumbered] – Take unnumbered (with overdubs) released on The Bootleg Series Volumes 1-3 (Rare & Unreleased) 1961–1991

==== May 3, 1979 ====
- Music Shoals Sound Studio, Sheffield, Alabama (12.00pm-3.00 pm, 4.00pm-7.00 pm)
  - "He Ain't No Man Righteous, No Not One" [Take unnumbered]
  - "I Believe in You" [Take 1] – Take 1 (with overdubs) released on Slow Train Coming
  - "I Believe in You" [Take unnumbered]
  - "Slow Train" [Take unnumbered] – Take unnumbered (with overdubs) released on Slow Train Coming
  - "He Ain't No Man Righteous, No Not One" [Overdubs onto Take 6]

==== May 4, 1979 ====
- Music Shoals Sound Studio, Sheffield, Alabama (12.00pm-3.00 pm, 4.00pm-7.00 pm, 8.00pm-11.00 pm)
  - "Gotta Serve Somebody" [Takes 1–4] – Take 3 (with overdubs) released on Slow Train Coming
  - "Do Right to Me Baby (Do Unto Others)" [Takes 1–4] – Take 4 released on Slow Train Coming
  - "When He Returns" [Takes 1–9] – Take 9 released on Slow Train Coming
  - "Man Gave Names to All the Animals" [Takes 1–4]
  - "Man Gave Names to All the Animals" [Take unnumbered]
  - "Man Gave Names to All the Animals" [Take 5] – Take 5 (with overdubs) released on Slow Train Coming
  - "I Believe in You" [Overdub onto Take 1]
  - "Slow Train" [Overdub onto Take unnumbered]
  - "Gotta Serve Somebody" [Overdub onto Take 3]
  - "Ye Shall Be Changed" [Overdub onto Take unnumbered] – Released on The Bootleg Series Volumes 1–3 (Rare & Unreleased) 1961–1991
  - "When You Gonna Wake Up" [Overdub onto Take unnumbered 3]

==== May 5, 1979 ====
- Music Shoals Sound Studio, Sheffield, Alabama (time unknown)
  - "Trouble in Mind" [Remake] [Overdub onto Take 5]
  - "Precious Angel" [Overdub onto Take unnumbered]
  - "Gonna Change My Way of Thinking" [Overdub onto Take 1]
  - "Slow Train" [Overdub onto Take unnumbered]

==== May 6, 1979 ====
- Music Shoals Sound Studio, Sheffield, Alabama (time unknown
  - "Trouble in Mind" [Remake] [Overdub onto Take 5] – Released as the B-side to "Gotta Serve Somebody"
  - "When You Gonna Wake Up" [Overdub onto Rake unnumbered 3]
  - "Slow Train" [Overdub onto Take unnumbered]

==== May 7, 1979 ====
- Music Shoals Sound Studio, Sheffield, Alabama (time unknown)
  - "Precious Angel" [Overdub onto Take unnumbered]
  - "Man Gave Names to All the Animals" [Overdub onto Take 5] – Released on Slow Train Coming

==== May 10, 1979 ====
- Music Shoals Sound Studio, Sheffield, Alabama (time unknown)
  - "Precious Angel" [Overdub onto Take unnumbered]
  - "When You Gonna Wake Up" [Overdubs onto Take unnumbered 3]
  - "Slow Train" [Overdub onto Take unnumbered]

==== May 11, 1979 ====
- Music Shoals Sound Studio, Sheffield, Alabama (9.00pm-12.00 pm)
  - "Gonna Change My Way of Thinking" [Overdub onto Take 1] – Released on Slow Train Coming
  - "Precious Angel" [Overdub onto Take unnumbered] – Released on Slow Train Coming
  - "When You Gonna Wake Up" [Overdub onto Take unnumbered 3] – Released on Slow Train Coming
  - "I Believe in You" [Overdub onto Take 1] – Released on Slow Train Coming
  - "Slow Train" [Overdub onto Take unnumbered] – Released on Slow Train Coming
  - "Gotta Serve Somebody" [Overdub onto Take 3] – Released on Slow Train Coming

== 1980 ==
=== Saved sessions ===
==== February 11, 1980 ====
- Music Shoals Sound Studio, Sheffield, Alabama (1.00pm-4.00 pm, 5.00pm-8.00 pm, 9.00pm-12.00 pm)
  - "Covenant Woman" [Takes 1–4]
  - "Covenant Woman" [Remake] [Takes 1–5]

==== February 12, 1980 ====
- Music Shoals Sound Studio, Sheffield, Alabama (1.00pm-4.00 pm, 5.00pm-8.00 pm, 9.00pm-12.00 pm)
  - "Solid Rock" [Takes 1–3] – Take 3 (with overdubs) released on Saved
  - "What Can I Do for You?" [Take 1] – Take 1 released on Saved
  - "Saved" (Tim Drummond/Bob Dylan) [Take 1]
  - "A Satisfied Mind" (Red Hayes/Jack Rhodes) [Take 1] – Take 1 released on Saved
  - "Saved" (Drummond/Dylan) [Take 2] – Take 2 (with overdubs) released on Saved

==== February 13, 1980 ====
- Music Shoals Sound Studio, Sheffield, Alabama (1.00pm-4.00 pm, 5.00pm-8.00 pm, 9.00pm-12.00 pm)
  - "Saving Grace" [Takes 1–2] – Take 1 or 2 released on Saved
  - "Pressing On" [Takes 1–2]
  - "Pressing On" [Remake] [Takes 1–5] – Take 5 released on Saved
  - "Unidentified song" [Take 1]
  - "Solid Rock" [Overdubs onto Take 3] – Released on Saved

==== February 14, 1980 ====
- Music Shoals Sound Studio, Sheffield, Alabama (1.00pm-4.00 pm, 5.00pm-8.00 pm, 9.00pm-12.00 pm)
  - "In the Garden" [Take 1]
  - "In the Garden" [Remake] [Takes 1–3] – Take 3 released on Saved
  - "Are You Ready?" [Takes 1–2]
  - "Are You Ready?" [Remake] [Takes 1–3] – Take 3 released on Saved
  - "Saved" (Drummond/Dylan) [Overdubs onto Take 2] – Released on Saved

==== February 15, 1980 ====
- Music Shoals Sound Studio, Sheffield, Alabama (1.00pm-4.00 pm, 5.00pm-8.00 pm, 9.00pm-12.00 pm)
  - "Covenant Woman" [Takes unknown] – Take unknown released on Saved

== See also ==
- Bob Dylan discography
- Bob Dylan bootleg recordings
- List of Bob Dylan songs based on earlier tunes
