= Guthrie Green =

Urban public park in Tulsa, Oklahoma

- Interactive map of Guthrie Green
- Type: Urban park
- Location: Tulsa, Oklahoma, U.S.
- Coordinates: 36°09′33″N 95°59′32″W
- Area: 2.6 acres
- Created: 2012
- Operator: George Kaiser Family Foundation
- Status: Open year-round
- Website: www.guthriegreen.com

Guthrie Green is an urban public park in the Tulsa Arts District of downtown Tulsa, Oklahoma, opened in September 2012. The 2.6-acre brownfield-to-park project was developed and is managed by the George Kaiser Family Foundation and is known for free, frequent public programming and a ground-source energy system integrated into the landscape. The American Planning Association named Guthrie Green one of its Great Places in America (Public Spaces) in 2016.

== History ==
The park occupies a former freight and truck-loading yard that underwent environmental remediation before redevelopment. The Oklahoma Department of Environmental Quality awarded a $200,000 petroleum brownfields subgrant used to remove 12 underground storage tanks at the site as part of broader neighborhood revitalization efforts led by the George Kaiser Family Foundation. Named after Oklahoma native and folk legend Woody Guthrie, the park was dedicated and opened to the public on September 7, 2012.

The surrounding district formally adopted the name Tulsa Arts District in 2017 following a business association vote to replace the previous "Brady" name. The district was formerly named after W. Tate Brady, a member of the Ku Klux Klan who was implicated in the Tulsa race massacre.

== Design and features ==
SWA Group served as landscape architect for the park, with John L. Wong as design lead. The 2.6-acre park includes a lawn amphitheater, covered stage, interactive fountains, gardens, tree-lined paths, and the Dock pavilion with café and restrooms. A geo-exchange system of 120 wells drilled to 500 feet supplies roughly 600 tons of heating and cooling capacity to adjacent arts facilities, with photovoltaic panels on the pavilion roof powering pumps and other systems.

== Programming and use ==
The park has regular public programming such as Food Truck Wednesdays, fitness classes, outdoor films, markets, and concerts that draw consistent crowds. The park has also functioned as a gathering space for high-profile broadcasts and community events, including a 2025 live appearance by NBC's Today that brought large crowds to the venue.

Music performances have featured national artists including Lucinda Williams, Kurt Vile, The Pharcyde, Los Lobos, and more.

== Reception and recognition ==
The project has been credited with catalyzing significant private and public investment in the surrounding downtown district. Guthrie Green was named one of the American Planning Association's Great Places in America (Public Spaces) in 2016. The park was a finalist for the Urban Land Institute's Urban Open Space Award in 2014. It received the Brownfield Renewal Award for Brownfields for Energy in 2013. World Architecture News recognized the project with its WAN Urban Design Award in 2013.
