= The Rambling Gambler =

Traditional folk song of the American West

"The Rambling Gambler" is a traditional folk song of the American West. It was first recorded in print by John A. & Alan Lomax in their jointly authored 1938 edition of Cowboy Songs and Other Frontier Ballads. Like many folk songs, it is known by a variety of titles, such as "Rambler, Gambler," and "I'm a Rambler, I'm a Gambler"

The song begins with the lines "I'm a rambler, I'm a gambler, I'm a long way from home / And the people who don't like me, they can leave me alone." Its lyrics mention two towns in Texas, Belton and Saline, as well as the state of Wyoming.

== History ==
John Lomax did not include the song in his original 1910 edition of Cowboy Songs and Other Frontier Ballads, but it appears in the 1938 edition, co-authored with his son Alan. The younger Lomax recorded that they learned the song from one Alec Moore, whom he described as a "retired cowpuncher … whose present occupation is riding herd on an ice-cream wagon on the streets of Austin, Texas."

Alan Lomax recorded his own rendition for his 1958 LP Texas Folksongs (Tradition Records, TLP1029).

In September 1960, 19-year-old Bob Dylan recorded the song — his second-earliest known solo recording session. The recording can be found (titled "Rambler, Gambler") on The Bootleg Series Vol. 7: No Direction Home: The Soundtrack.

Joan Baez performed the song live in the early 1960s; a 1963 recording is included in some editions of Joan Baez in Concert, Part 2; her 1989 album Speaking of Dreams included a medley of the song, paired with The Del-Vikings' "Whispering Bells", performed with Paul Simon.

Other notable performers to have recorded the song include Odetta (as "Rambler-Gambler"), Simon & Garfunkel (as "Rose of Aberdeen"), Flatt & Scruggs, Gordon Bok (as "I'm a Rambler, I'm a Gambler"), Ian & Sylvia (as "Rambler Gambler"), and Sandy & Caroline Paton (as "I'm a Rambler and a Gambler"). The Clancy Brothers' song "The Moonshiner" incorporates significant elements of the song, including the chorus.
