= George Kaiser Family Foundation =

American philanthropic organization

- Formation: 1999
- Founder: George Kaiser
- Founded at: Tulsa, Oklahoma
- Type: Nonprofit
- Tax ID no.: 73-1574370
- Legal status: Supporting organization
- Headquarters: Tulsa, Oklahoma, United States of America
- Region served: Oklahoma
- Key people: Ken Levit (executive director)
- Funding: private
- Endowment: $5 billion (2024)
- Website: www.gkff.org

George Kaiser Family Foundation is an American philanthropic organization based in Tulsa, Oklahoma. It was established by George Kaiser in 1999 and is known for funding early childhood education, economic and community development, maternal and child health, public and charter schools, and criminal justice programs. As of 2024, the GKFF's assets totaled approximately $5 billion.

== Overview ==
George Kaiser established the George Kaiser Family Foundation (GKFF) in 1999 as a supporting organization of Tulsa Community Foundation. The foundation primarily supports causes in Tulsa, Oklahoma, and was initially focused on improving access to, and quality of early childhood education. The foundation's focus has since broadened to include: community-based initiatives that work to reduce poverty and improve quality of life for low income families and neighborhoods, early learning and public education programs, re-entry programs for justice-involved individuals, maternal and child wellness, arts and culture, and economic and neighborhood development. The New York Times described the foundation as guided by the philosophy that "no newborn child should bear responsibility for the circumstances of her birth."

Kaiser developed his philosophy of charitable giving "around the concept of providing the greatest opportunity for self fulfillment for each child, focusing on those who arrive in the least advantaged circumstances." Kaiser funds GKFF through monetary donations, ownership in companies, and public or privately traded stocks. He signed The Giving Pledge in 2010.

Ken Levit is the foundation's executive director. GKFF's board is made up of ten individuals, including Kaiser's three children. The foundation's board is structured to give the majority control to local community leaders. As of 2024, GKFF had approximately $5 billion in assets, supported 50 partner programs, and gave $200 million annually to programs in Tulsa.

== Programs and focus areas ==
=== Early childhood development and education ===
Kaiser opened the first Educare center, part of an early-childhood development program for low-income children in 2006. GKFF spent $18 million to build the first two Tulsa Educare centers. By 2019, the program had four centers. A 2022 study from the University of Oklahoma followed academic progress of children who had been randomly assigned to Tulsa Educare centers for early childhood education. Results showed increased academic performance in kindergarten through third-grade for children in the group assigned to Tulsa Educare. GKFF was among funders of the study.

GKFF funded the Birth through Eight Strategy for Tulsa (BEST) in 2017, a program to support early childhood development through early engagement, caregiver training, and the expansion of social services for low-income children beyond center-based care.

=== Healthcare and social justice ===
Kaiser became interested in healthcare after he learned that poverty has a major effect on life and that there was a 14-year difference in life expectancy between people living in Tulsa's richest and poorest ZIP codes. GKFF donated $62 million to establish the School of Community Medicine at the University of Oklahoma's Tulsa campus in 2008. Students work in clinics where poverty is above average, and receive training in handling patients with limited resources. The program reimburses all tuition for students who graduate as doctors and who work for five years in a low-income community providing primary care.

GKFF and Tulsa's Family & Children's Services established the Women in Recovery program in 2009. Aimed at mothers facing prison sentences, the 18-month diversion program includes drug rehabilitation, therapy, and career training. The state of Oklahoma later partnered with the program to reimburse it for each woman it rehabilitated.

=== Community development ===
GKFF is the primary funder of the Tulsa Community Foundation, which Kaiser established along with other philanthropists from the area in 1998. The foundation also funded the National Energy Policy Institute, a non-profit energy policy organization located at the University of Tulsa whose president at its inception was former Alaska governor Tony Knowles.

In 2011, GKFF bought the Woody Guthrie archives and relocated them from New York City to Tulsa. The Woody Guthrie Center opened in 2013. GKFF has also purchased and renovated buildings, such as the Archer Building, to house retail, living, and artist studio space. The foundation later purchased The Bob Dylan Archive for $20 million in 2016, and later established the The Bob Dylan Center in 2022.

GKFF supported the arts through its Tulsa Art Fellowship program, which provided a stipend for living and work space, as well as a cash stipend.

GKFF invested $340 million in the Solyndra Corporation, which subsequently gave preferential consideration to a plant site proposed for an economically depressed area of North Tulsa. Solyndra declared bankruptcy in 2011 and the plant was never built.

==== Gathering Place ====
Gathering Place is a 66-acre public park in Tulsa. GKFF provided $200 million in property and funds to design and operate the park. The park, which opened on September 8, 2018, was designed by Michael Van Valkenburgh and includes a children's museum. At the time, it was one of the largest public parks created with private funds, according to The New York Times. The park has been on USA Today's list of top 10 public parks five times as of 2025.

==== Tulsa Innovation Labs ====
Tulsa Innovation Labs (TIL) is a subsidiary of GKFF. The foundation launched it in 2020 with a $50 million initial investment. TIL is focused on developing Tulsa into a tech hub. When it launched in 2020, TIL was focused on funding companies in virtual health, energy tech, drones, cybersecurity and analytics.

In 2024, Tulsa received $51 million in funding from the federal government, as part of the CHIPS and Science Act to develop designated tech hubs outside of Silicon Valley. The funds went to the Tulsa Hub for Equitable & Trustworthy Autonomy, which is a consortium led by TIL. Projects to be supported by the funding included building an "artificial intelligence center of excellence" and facilities to support expanding capacity for small businesses, and developing workforce training programs. The funding was expected to support 56,000 jobs over ten years.

==== Tulsa Remote ====
GKFF launched Tulsa Remote in 2018. The program pays remote workers $10,000 to relocate to Tulsa. As of 2026 more than 4,000 people relocated to Tulsa through the program. Tulsa World reported that as of 2024, participants in Tulsa Remote had created 1,400 jobs, generated $30.5 million in state and county taxes, and together contributed more than $622 million to Tulsa's economy. In 2021, the Oklahoma legislature passed a bill to provide tax incentives for creation of programs based on Tulsa Remote. The program is also supported by the Oklahoma Department of Commerce.

According to a study by the W.E. Upjohn Institute for Employment Research, 96% of people enrolled in Tulsa Remote stayed for the full year of the program and 70% remained as of May 2025; the program generated $4 in benefits to the local economy for every dollar spent; and each new job created by the program cost approximately $36,000, compared to the average of $218,000.
