= Sweet Amarillo =

"Sweet Amarillo" is a song written by Donna Weiss. Brenda Patterson released the song on her 1974 album "Like Good Wine".

Bob Dylan sang a brief version of the song during a 1973 recording sessions for the Pat Garrett & Billy The Kid soundtrack. Donna Weiss and Brenda Patterson were also singing at the session.

Donna Weiss performed the song several occasions on the second leg of Bob Dylan's Rolling Thunder Revue concert tour.

The Old Crow Medicine Show (OCMS) released a version on July 1, 2014 on their Remedy album. Bob Dylan asked Ketch Secor of OCMS to finish the song, and after OCMS sent their demo to Bob, Ketch recalls "…So I finished the song with Old Crow, and we sent it back to Bob and he said, ‘Hey, that sounds great, but I think Ketch should play the fiddle, not the harmonica, and I think the chorus needs to come in at the eighth bar, not the 16th.’ We did exactly what Bob said, and it's like the song sprouted wings and flew."
