= Pat Garrett & Billy the Kid (album) =

1973 studio album by Bob Dylan

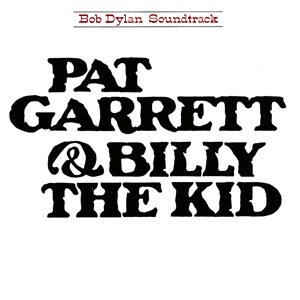

Studio album / soundtrack album by Bob Dylan
- Released: July 13, 1973
- Recorded: January–February 1973
- Genres: Country rock; folk rock; film score
- Length: 35:23
- Label: Columbia
- Producer: Gordon Carroll

Bob Dylan chronology
Bob Dylan's Greatest Hits Vol. II (1971)	Pat Garrett & Billy the Kid (1973)	Dylan (1973)

Bob Dylan studio album chronology
New Morning (1970)	Billy Garrett & Billy the Kid (1973)	Dylan (1973)

Singles from Pat Garrett & Billy the Kid
- 1. "Knockin' on Heaven's Door" Released: 13 July 1973

Pat Garrett & Billy the Kid is the twelfth studio album and first soundtrack album by American singer-songwriter Bob Dylan, released on July 13, 1973, by Columbia Records for the Sam Peckinpah film Pat Garrett and Billy the Kid. Dylan himself appeared in the film as the character "Alias". The soundtrack consists mainly of instrumental music and was inspired by the movie itself. The album includes "Knockin' on Heaven's Door", which became a trans-Atlantic Top 20 hit.

Certified gold by RIAA, Pat Garrett & Billy the Kid reached No. 16 in the US and No. 29 in the UK.

== Filming of Pat Garrett and Billy the Kid ==
Pat Garrett and Billy the Kid scriptwriter Rudy Wurlitzer was a previous acquaintance of Dylan's, and asked him to provide a couple of songs for the movie. Dylan performed "Billy" for director Peckinpah, who found the performance very moving and offered Dylan an acting part on the spot. The role he ended up getting was a character named Alias. In November 1972, Dylan and his family moved to Durango, Mexico, where filming took place. Filming lasted from late 1972 to early 1973.

== Recording ==
Dylan's first session for the Pat Garrett and Billy the Kid soundtrack was on January 20, 1973 at CBS Discos Studios in Mexico City. The only song from that day that was included on the album was "Billy 7"; also recorded were multiple other takes of "Billy", and the outtakes "Under Turkey", "Billy Surrenders", "And He's Killed Me Too", "Goodbye Holly" and "Pecos Blues". The following month, Dylan recorded two days at Burbank Studios in Burbank, California. The rest of the album's songs were recorded, as well as the outtakes "Sweet Amarillo" and "Rock Me, Mama".

== Outtakes ==
The Mexico City session produced three notable outtakes: "Peco's Blues", an instrumental based on the traditional "What Does The Deep Sea Say?", the song "Goodbye Holly" and "Billy Surrenders". All three tracks were rejected but eventually bootlegged and unofficially released as Peco's Blues Pat Garrett & Billy the Kid Outtakes in 1994. Of the 24 tracks written and performed by Bob Dylan on the bootleg album, only 10 were released on the final studio album. The remaining 14 songs have not been officially released.

=== Legacy ===
In February 1973, during the second of the Burbank sessions, Bob Dylan recorded 19 songs for the album. Among them were "Sweet Amarillo" and "Rock Me, Mama". According to Ketch Secor of the Nashville band Old Crow Medicine Show, Bob Dylan attributed the lyrics of "Rock Me, Mama" to Arthur "Big Boy" Crudup who in turn attributed them to Big Bill Broonzy.

Both "Rock Me, Mama" and "Sweet Amarillo" were eventually completed and recorded by the Nashville band Old Crow Medicine Show, who credited Bob Dylan as co-writer. "Wagon Wheel" was released in 2004 (and subsequently covered by many other artists, including Darius Rucker) and "Sweet Amarillo" was released in 2014.

== Critical reception ==
Professional ratings
Review scores
Source	Rating
AllMusic	3.5/5 stars
Christgau's Record Guide	C+
The Encyclopedia of Popular Music	2/5 stars
Entertainment Weekly	C+
MusicHound Rock	1/5
The Rolling Stone Album Guide	2/5 stars

Most critics at the time responded unfavorably. Robert Christgau graded it a "C" in Creem, described the album as "two middling Dylan songs, four good original Bobby voices, and a lot of Schmylan music". Jon Landau wrote in Rolling Stone that "it is every bit as inept, amateurish and embarrassing as Self Portrait. And it has all the earmarks of a deliberate courting of commercial disaster, a flirtation that is apparently part of an attempt to free himself from previously imposed obligations derived from his audience."

The album spawned a significant hit in "Knockin' on Heaven's Door", which would be covered by acts such as Eric Clapton, Guns N' Roses and Warren Zevon.

== Legacy ==
After Peckinpah completed his own cut of Pat Garrett and Billy the Kid, MGM re-cut the film without his input, removing several significant scenes and re-shuffling most of Dylan's music in the process. Peckinpah's film was released to mixed reviews. Years later, critical re-evaluation of Peckinpah's film would lead many to regard it as one of his major works, a revisionist view aided by the restoration of Peckinpah's original cut in 1984.

After witnessing firsthand Peckinpah's battles with MGM, Dylan had his own problems with Columbia Records. After years of minimal activity, Dylan had lost Columbia's patience, and when negotiations for a renewed contract began in 1972, the label (except for Clive Davis) had little interest in being generous. "Early in 1973 I finally did conclude negotiations for a new contract with Bob," wrote Clive Davis in his autobiography. Davis had been a longtime supporter of Dylan's, but he had been the victim of a corporate coup. While finalizing the details of Dylan's contract, Davis was fired by CBS president Arthur Taylor on May 29. Dylan testified on Davis's behalf in a well-publicized civil trial held in July 1975. In the meantime, the incident soured Dylan's relationship with CBS, convincing him to sign with David Geffen's fledgling Los Angeles-based label Asylum Records.

== Track listing ==
All tracks are written by Bob Dylan.

Side one
No.	Title	Length
1.	"Main Title Theme (Billy)" (instrumental)	6:07
2.	"Cantina Theme (Workin' for the Law)" (instrumental)	2:57
3.	"Billy 1"	3:57
4.	"Bunkhouse Theme" (instrumental)	2:17
5.	"River Theme" (instrumental)	1:30
Total length:		16:48

Side two
No.	Title	Length
1.	"Turkey Chase" (instrumental)	3:34
2.	"Knockin' on Heaven's Door"	2:32
3.	"Final Theme" (instrumental)	5:23
4.	"Billy 4"	5:04
5.	"Billy 7"	2:10
Total length:		18:43

== Personnel ==
- Bob Dylan – guitar, vocals, harmonica
- Byron Berline – backing vocals, fiddle
- Fred Katz, Ted Michel – cello
- Gary Foster – recorder, flute
- Carl Fortina – harmonium
- Jolly Roger – banjo
- Bruce Langhorne – acoustic guitar
- Roger McGuinn – guitar
- Carol Hunter – twelve-string guitar, backing vocals
- Booker T. Jones – bass guitar
- Terry Paul – bass guitar, backing vocals
- Jim Keltner – drums
- Russ Kunkel – tambourine, bongos
- Priscilla Jones, Brenda Patterson, Donna Weiss – backing vocals

== Charts ==
Chart (1973)	Peak position
Australian Albums (Kent Music Report)	28
Spanish Albums Chart	8
UK Albums (Official Charts Company)	29
US Billboard 200	16
