= Alis Lesley =

American singer (born 1938)

- Born: Alice Lesley or Alice Leslie; April 20, 1938 (age 87); Chicago, Illinois, U.S.
- Genres: rockabilly
- Instruments: Vocals; guitar
- Years active: 1956–1959
- Labels: Era Records
- Formerly of: Arizona Stringdusters

Alis Lesley (born Alice Lesley or Alice Leslie; April 20, 1938) is an American former rockabilly singer, once billed as "the female Elvis Presley."

== Early life ==
Lesley was born in Chicago, Illinois, United States. Her family later moved to Phoenix, Arizona, where she attended Phoenix Junior College. She majored in television and radio, and began singing rockabilly while a student. She was discovered by Kathryn Godfrey, a popular Phoenix television personality and the sister of Arthur Godfrey. With Kathryn Godfrey's help, Lesley became a local favorite following her appearances on television station KTVK and in local night clubs.

== Career ==
Early on, Lesley formed her own western band, the Arizona Stringdusters, and were a night club act in Phoenix. She then joined bandleader Buddy Morrow's band and relocated to Hollywood, Los Angeles. "I wore sheath dresses and high heels while I was with the band. But when I really started singing, the heels seemed to hold me back." From then on, Lesley adopted the barefoot look when performing live and was known for kicking off her heels.

Lesley's stage persona as the "Female Elvis Presley" included a guitar slung around her neck, greased-back hair, and combed-down sideburns. She met Elvis Presley at the Silver Slipper Casino in Las Vegas, Nevada, on November 13, 1956. Presley had attended the show to watch Lesley perform and praised her afterwards, meeting her backstage.

In 1957, Lesley released her debut and only single, "He Will Come Back to Me" backed with "Heartbreak Harry" (Era Records 45-1034).

She toured Australia in October 1957, with Little Richard, Eddie Cochran, Gene Vincent, and local rocker Johnny O'Keefe. The tour was cut short when Richard underwent a "religious experience" and he retired from rock and roll for several years.

== Legacy ==
A picture of Lesley between Little Richard and Eddie Cochran appears on the cover of The Philosophy of Modern Song written by Bob Dylan.

== Discography ==
=== Single ===
- "He Will Come Back to Me" b/w "Heartbreak Harry" (Era Records, 1957)

=== Compilations ===
- Barefoot Rockabilly Angel (K-Tel, 2008)
- He Will Come Back to Me (Sleazy Records, 2016)
