= The Philosophy of Modern Song =

2022 book by Bob Dylan

- Cover of the book, showing Little Richard, Alis Lesley, and Eddie Cochran on September 28, 1957
- Author: Bob Dylan
- Publisher: Simon & Schuster
- Publication date: November 1, 2022
- Pages: 352
- ISBN: 978-1398519411

The Philosophy of Modern Song is a book by American singer-songwriter Bob Dylan, published on November 1, 2022, by Simon & Schuster. The book contains Dylan's commentary on 66 songs by other artists. It is the first book Dylan has published since he was awarded the Nobel Prize in Literature.

== Summary ==
The Philosophy of Modern Song consists of 66 short essays on popular songs, the earliest of which are Uncle Dave Macon's 1924 recording of "Keep My Skillet Good and Greasy" and Alvin Youngblood Hart's 2004 recording of Stephen Foster's 1846 "Nelly Was a Lady". The most recently composed song included in the book is Warren Zevon's 2003 song "Dirty Life and Times". Most of the chapters are divided into two parts, a poetic introductory segment in which Dylan uses a second-person point-of-view to inhabit the narrator of the song (what Simon & Schuster referred to as "dreamlike riffs" in pre-release publicity) followed by a more conventionally written essay portion.

== Chapters ==
Song	Artist	Songwriter(s)
"Detroit City"	Bobby Bare	Danny Dill and Mel Tillis
"Pump It Up"	Elvis Costello & the Attractions	Elvis Costello
"Without a Song"	Perry Como	Vincent Youmans, Billy Rose and Edward Eliscu
"Take Me from This Garden of Evil"	Jimmy Wages	Jimmy Wages
"There Stands the Glass"	Webb Pierce	Russ Hull, Mary Jean Shurtz and Autry Greisham
"Willy the Wandering Gypsy and Me"	Billy Joe Shaver	Billy Joe Shaver
"Tutti Frutti"	Little Richard	Little Richard and Dorothy LaBostrie
"Money Honey"	Elvis Presley	Jesse Stone
"My Generation"	The Who	Pete Townshend
"Jesse James"	Harry McClintock	Traditional
"Poor Little Fool"	Ricky Nelson	Sharon Sheeley
"Pancho and Lefty"	Willie Nelson and Merle Haggard	Townes Van Zandt
"The Pretender"	Jackson Browne	Jackson Browne
"Mack the Knife"	Bobby Darin	Kurt Weill and Bertolt Brecht
"The Whiffenpoof Song"	Bing Crosby	Tod B. Galloway, Meade Minnigerode and George S. Pomeroy
"You Don't Know Me"	Eddy Arnold	Eddy Arnold and Cindy Walker
"Ball of Confusion"	The Temptations	Norman Whitfield and Barrett Strong
"Poison Love"	Johnnie and Jack	Mrs. Elmer Laird
"Beyond the Sea"	Bobby Darin	Jack Lawrence and Charles Trenet
"On the Road Again"	Willie Nelson	Willie Nelson
"If You Don't Know Me by Now"	Harold Melvin & the Blue Notes	Kenny Gamble and Leon Huff
"The Little White Cloud That Cried"	Johnnie Ray	Johnnie Ray
"El Paso"	Marty Robbins	Marty Robbins
"Nelly Was a Lady"	Alvin Youngblood Hart	Stephen Foster
"Cheaper to Keep Her"	Johnnie Taylor	Mack Rice
"I Got a Woman"	Ray Charles	Ray Charles and Renald Richard
"CIA Man"	The Fugs	Tuli Kupferberg
"On the Street Where You Live"	Vic Damone	Frederick Loewe and Alan Jay Lerner
"Truckin'"	Grateful Dead	Jerry Garcia, Bob Weir, Phil Lesh and Robert Hunter
"Ruby, Are You Mad?"	Osborne Brothers	Cousin Emmy
"Old Violin"	Johnny Paycheck	Johnny Paycheck
"Volare"	Domenico Modugno	Domenico Modugno and Franco Migliacci
"London Calling"	The Clash	Joe Strummer and Mick Jones
"Your Cheatin' Heart"	Hank Williams	Hank Williams
"Blue Bayou"	Roy Orbison	Roy Orbison and Joe Melson
"Midnight Rider"	The Allman Brothers Band	Gregg Allman and Robert Kim Payne
"Blue Suede Shoes"	Carl Perkins	Carl Perkins
"My Prayer"	The Platters	Georges Boulanger, Carlos Gómez Barrera and Jimmy Kennedy
"Dirty Life and Times"	Warren Zevon	Warren Zevon
"Doesn't Hurt Anymore"	John Trudell	John Trudell
"Key to the Highway"	Little Walter	Big Bill Broonzy and Charlie Segar
"Everybody Cryin' Mercy"	Mose Allison	Mose Allison
"War"	Edwin Starr	Norman Whitfield and Barrett Strong
"Big River"	Johnny Cash	Johnny Cash
"Feel So Good"	Sonny Burgess	Herman Parker
"Blue Moon"	Dean Martin	Richard Rodgers and Lorenz Hart
"Gypsies, Tramps & Thieves"	Cher	Bob Stone
"Keep My Skillet Good and Greasy"	Uncle Dave Macon	Uncle Dave Macon
"It's All in the Game"	Tommy Edwards	Charles G. Dawes and Carl Sigman
"A Certain Girl"	Ernie K-Doe	Allen Toussaint
"I've Always Been Crazy"	Waylon Jennings	Waylon Jennings
"Witchy Woman"	Eagles	Don Henley and Bernie Leadon
"Big Boss Man"	Jimmy Reed	Luther Dixon and Al Smith
"Long Tall Sally"	Little Richard	Enotris Johnson, Robert Blackwell and Richard Penniman
"Old and Only in the Way"	Charlie Poole	Charlie Poole and Norman Woodlief
"Black Magic Woman"	Santana	Peter Green
"By the Time I Get to Phoenix"	Jimmy Webb	Jimmy Webb
"Come On-a My House"	Rosemary Clooney	Ross Bagdasarian and William Saroyan
"Don't Take Your Guns to Town"	Johnny Cash	Johnny Cash
"Come Rain or Come Shine"	Judy Garland	Harold Arlen and Johnny Mercer
"Don't Let Me Be Misunderstood"	Nina Simone	Bennie Benjamin, Horace Ott and Sol Marcus
"Strangers in the Night"	Frank Sinatra	Bert Kaempfert, Charles Singleton and Eddie Snyder
"Viva Las Vegas"	Elvis Presley	Doc Pomus and Mort Shuman
"Saturday Night at the Movies"	The Drifters	Barry Mann and Cynthia Weil
"Waist Deep in the Big Muddy"	Pete Seeger	Pete Seeger
"Where or When"	Dion and the Belmonts	Richard Rodgers and Lorenz Hart

== Release and promotion ==
The book's publication was announced on March 8, 2022. According to Simon & Schuster, Dylan had begun working on the book in 2010.

Prior to its release, on October 13, 2022, excerpts from the book (from the chapters on "My Generation" and "Strangers in the Night") appeared in The New York Times. The hardcover edition of The Philosophy of Modern Song was published on November 1, 2022. To promote the book, Dylan only consented to one interview, which appeared in The Wall Street Journal on December 19, 2022. In a discussion with critic and musician Jeff Slate, Dylan talked about songwriting, streaming music technology, life during the COVID-19 pandemic-induced lockdown and why the book included a thank you to the "crew at Dunkin' Donuts" ("because they were compassionate, supportive and they went the extra mile"). Later that same day, an extended version of the interview appeared on Dylan's official website.

A theatrical event based on the book was held at the 92nd Street Y in New York City on the evening of July 17, 2023. Directed by filmmaker Michael Almereyda, the event featured readings from the book by actors André De Shields and Odessa Young and musical performances by Meshell Ndegeocello.

== Reception ==
Neil McCormick of The Daily Telegraph awarded the book a full five stars, and described it as "an excuse for the great man to write with joyful zest, piercing profundity and flamboyant imagination about whatever crosses his mind". David Remnick, writing in The New Yorker, praised it as "a rich, riffy, funny, and completely engaging book of essays". The book was described as "absolutely one of the best books about popular music ever written" by Chris Willman in Variety. Rolling Stone included it in a list of the "best music books of 2022". The Chicago Tribune named it one of the "10 best books of 2022" and the Sydney Morning Herald named it one of 10 books that "made their mark in 2022". The Buffalo News cited it as "one of the great books... of the past decade".

Jody Rosen of the Los Angeles Times and Ludovic Hunter-Tilney of The Financial Times both noted that only four of the songs included were by women, which they interpreted as a "misogynist" oversight on the part of the author. Anne Margaret Daniel, writing in The Spectator, however, cautioned against looking at Dylan's choice of songs as representing any sort of canon or even list of "favorites", noting that Dylan actually seems to "dislike" some of the selections (e.g., Bing Crosby's "The Whiffenpoof Song" and the Eagles' "Witchy Woman"). Daniel noted that Dylan appears to be using this particular set of songs "to illustrate points, to instruct and to entertain, not to...tell us what he likes best".

The book debuted at number three on The New York Times nonfiction best-seller list for the week ending November 5, 2022. It spent 10 consecutive weeks on the list.

== Images ==
The book features hundreds of photographs and illustrations, licensed from many different sources, the overall design of which is credited to Coco Shinomiya (who also designed several of Dylan's 21st century albums). When asked to discuss the "significance" of the images by Jeff Slate, Dylan responded, "They’re running mates to the text, involved in the same way, share the same outcome. They portray ideas and associations that you might not notice otherwise, visual interaction". Anne Margaret Daniel wrote that the illustrations "deserve both mention and praise. They are copious, and they comment on, enrich and complicate every song". Daniel cites a film still of Richard Burton and Elizabeth Taylor from Who's Afraid of Virginia Woolf? used to illustrate the divorce song "Cheaper to Keep Her" as "the perfect gimme" while noting that her favorites are the images of a flat sea, a whale hunt gone wrong and a still of Burt Lancaster and Deborah Kerr kissing on the beach in From Here to Eternity, which more obliquely comment on Bobby Darin's "Beyond the Sea".

== Audiobook ==
An audiobook version of The Philosophy of Modern Song was released concurrently with the book. The audiobook was narrated by Dylan, with actors Jeff Bridges, Oscar Isaac, Rita Moreno, Jeffrey Wright, Sissy Spacek, John Goodman, Alfre Woodard, Steve Buscemi, Helen Mirren, and Renée Zellweger as guest narrators.

Audiophile Magazine referred to Dylan's narration as "raspy and compelling" and wrote of the all-star cast: "Almost as one voice, the narrators create a flow of energy that adds immeasurably to the impact of Dylan’s poetic writing".

== Autograph controversy ==
900 limited edition hand-signed autograph versions of the book were offered for sale online through Simon & Schuster for a price of $599 in the U.S. but it was soon discovered that they were not actually hand-signed by Dylan. The books in question appeared to be machine signed by an autopen or signing device, using at least 17 different signature variations. The publisher apologized in a tweet and provided refunds.
