= Bob Dylan =

American singer-songwriter (born 1941)

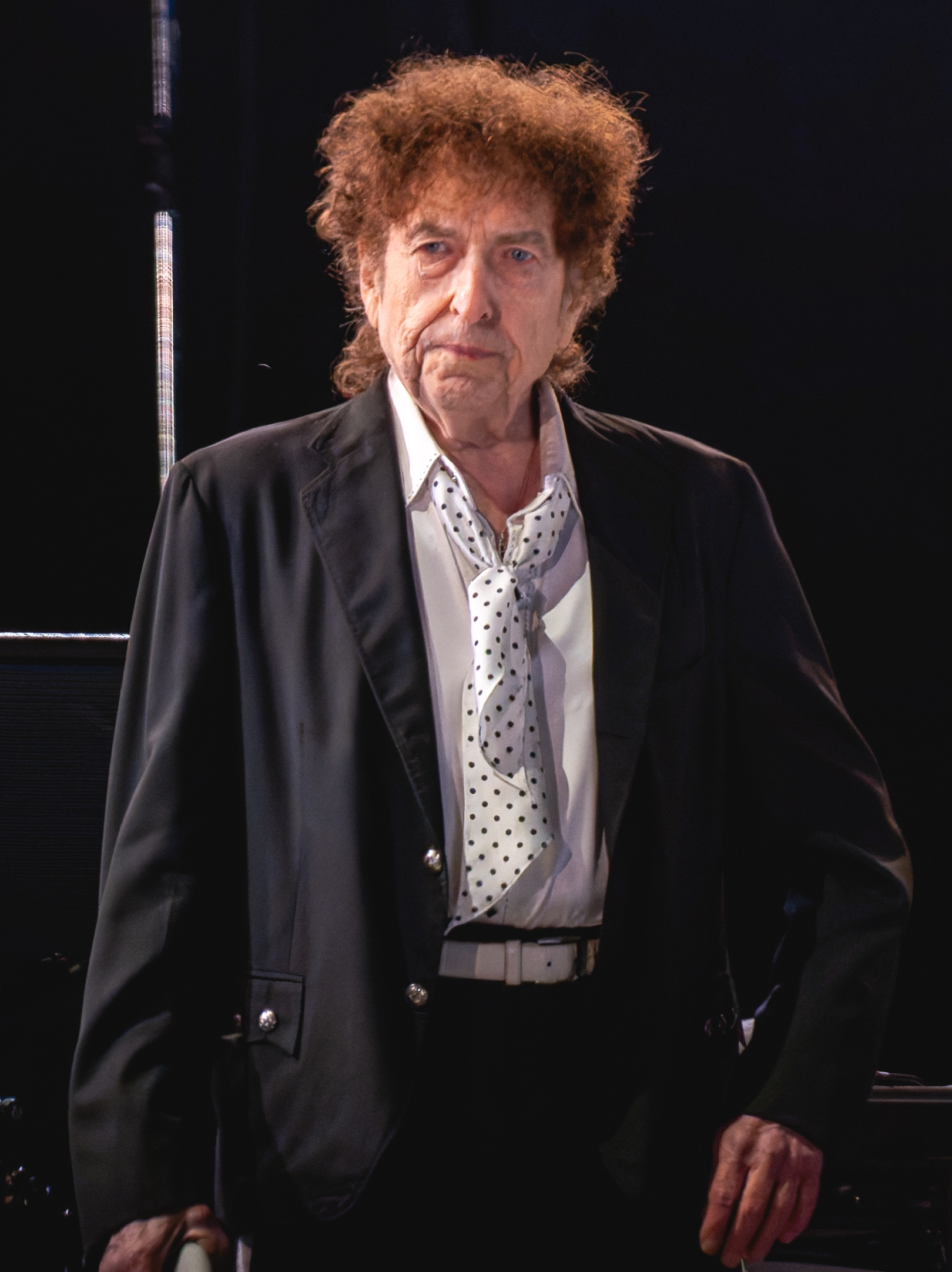
- Dylan in 2019
- Born: Robert Allen Zimmerman; May 24, 1941 (age 85); Duluth, Minnesota, U.S.
- Other names: Shabtai Zisel ben Avraham (Hebrew name); Elston Gunnn; Blind Boy Grunt; Bob Landy; Robert Milkwood Thomas; Tedham Porterhouse; Lucky Wilbury; Boo Wilbury; Jack Frost; Sergei Petrov; Zimmy
- Occupations: Singer–songwriter; painter; writer
- Years active: 1957–present
- Spouses: Sara Lownds (m. 1965; div. 1977) Carolyn Dennis (m. 1986; div. 1992)
- Children: 6, including Jesse and Jakob
- Awards: 2016 Nobel Prize in Literature; (for others, see list)
- Musical career
- Genres: Folk; folk rock; blues; rock; gospel; country; traditional pop
- Instruments: Vocals; guitar; harmonica; keyboards
- Works: Albums and singles; songs; bootleg recordings
- Labels: Columbia; Asylum
- Formerly of: Traveling Wilburys
- Website: bobdylan.com

Bob Dylan (legally Robert Dylan; born Robert Allen Zimmerman, May 24, 1941) is an American singer-songwriter. Described as one of the greatest songwriters of all time, Dylan has been a major figure in popular culture over his 69-year career. Dylan added increasingly sophisticated lyrical techniques to the folk music of the early 1960s, infusing it "with the intellectualism of classic literature and poetry". His lyrics incorporated political, social, and philosophical influences, defying pop music conventions and appealing to the burgeoning counterculture.

Born and raised in Minnesota, Dylan moved to New York City in 1961 to pursue a music career. His eponymous debut, containing traditional folk and blues material, was followed by his breakthrough album, The Freewheelin' Bob Dylan (1963), which included "A Hard Rain's a-Gonna Fall". His "Blowin' in the Wind" (1963) and "The Times They Are a-Changin' (1964) became anthems for the civil rights and antiwar movements. Dylan sparked controversy when he used electrically amplified rock instrumentation on Bringing It All Back Home, Highway 61 Revisited (both 1965), and Blonde on Blonde (1966). His six-minute single "Like a Rolling Stone" (1965) expanded commercial and creative boundaries in popular music.

After a motorcycle crash in 1966, Dylan ceased touring for seven years. During this period, he recorded a large body of songs with the Band, released as The Basement Tapes (1975). Dylan explored country music and rural themes on John Wesley Harding (1967), Nashville Skyline (1969), and New Morning (1970). He acted in Pat Garrett and Billy the Kid (1973) and provided its soundtrack, which included "Knockin' on Heaven's Door". He contined the Western themes on Blood on the Tracks (1975), featuring "Tangled Up in Blue". In the late 1970s, he converted to Christianity and recorded gospel music. Time Out of Mind (1997) won the Grammy Award for Album of the Year. Dylan has toured since the late 1980s on the Never Ending Tour. He has published ten books of paintings and drawings and a memoir, Chronicles: Volume One (2004). His career has been chronicled in films, including the documentary No Direction Home (2005) and the biopic A Complete Unknown (2024).

With an estimated 125 million records sold worldwide, Dylan is one of the best-selling musicians of all time. His accolades include an Academy Award and ten Grammy Awards. He was honored with Kennedy Center Honors in 1997 and the Presidential Medal of Freedom in 2012. Dylan has been inducted into the Rock and Roll Hall of Fame and the Songwriters Hall of Fame. He was awarded a 2008 Pulitzer Prize special citation and the 2016 Nobel Prize in Literature "for having created new poetic expressions within the great American song tradition".

== Early life and education ==
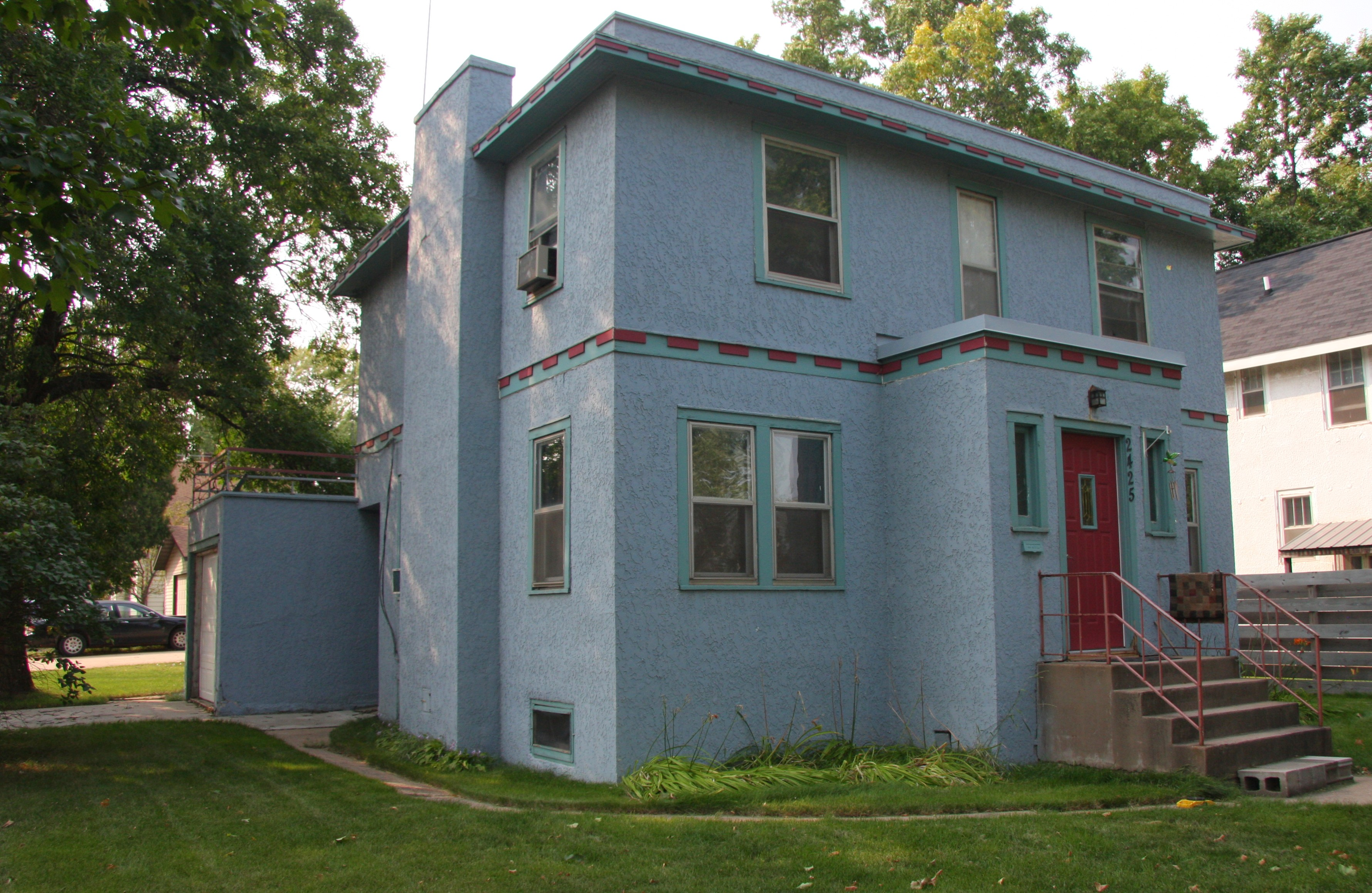
The Bob Dylan Childhood Home in Hibbing, Minnesota

Bob Dylan was born Robert Allen Zimmerman (his Hebrew name being Shabtai Zisl ben Avraham; שבתאי-זיסל בן אברהם) on May 24, 1941, at St. Mary's Hospital, in Duluth, Minnesota. Dylan's paternal grandparents, Anna Kirghiz and Zigman Zimmerman, emigrated from Odessa in the Russian Empire (now Ukraine) to the United States after the 1905 pogroms against Jews. His maternal grandparents, Florence and Ben Stone, were Lithuanian Jews who had arrived in the US in 1902. Dylan wrote that his paternal grandmother's family was originally from the Kağızman District of Kars Province, northeastern Turkey.

Dylan's father Abram Zimmerman and his mother Beatrice "Beatty" Stone were part of a small, close-knit Jewish community. They lived in Duluth until Dylan was six, when his father contracted polio and the family returned to his mother's hometown of Hibbing, where they lived for the rest of Dylan's childhood, and his father and paternal uncles ran a furniture and appliance store.

As a teenager, Dylan heard rock and roll on radio stations broadcasting from Shreveport and Little Rock. Dylan formed several bands while at Hibbing High School: the Golden Chords performed covers of Little Richard and Elvis Presley. Their performance of Danny & the Juniors's "Rock and Roll Is Here to Stay" at their high school talent show was so loud that the principal cut the microphone. On January 31, 1959, Dylan saw Buddy Holly play at the Duluth Armory, four days before Holly's fatal plane crash. Dylan was electrified: "Buddy wrote songs – songs that had beautiful melodies and imaginative verses. And he sang great – sang in more than a few voices. He was the archetype. Everything I wasn't and wanted to be."

In 1959, Dylan's high school yearbook carried the caption "Robert Zimmerman: to join 'Little Richard'". That year, as Elston Gunnn, he performed twice with Bobby Vee, playing piano and clapping. In September, Dylan enrolled at the University of Minnesota. and began to perform at the Ten O'Clock Scholar, a coffeehouse near campus, becoming part of the Dinkytown folk music circuit. His focus on rock and roll gave way to American folk music, as he explained in 1985:

The thing about rock'n'roll is that for me anyway it wasn't enough.... There were great catch-phrases and driving pulse rhythms ... but the songs weren't serious or didn't reflect life in a realistic way. I knew that when I got into folk music, it was more of a serious type of thing. The songs are filled with more despair, more sadness, more triumph, more faith in the supernatural, much deeper feelings.

During this period, he began to introduce himself as "Bob Dylan". (Note: According to Robert Shelton, Dylan first confided his change of name to his high school girlfriend, Echo Helstrom, in 1958, telling her that he had found a "great name, Bob Dillon". Shelton surmises that Dillon had two sources: Marshal Matt Dillon was the hero of the TV western Gunsmoke; Dillon was also the name of one of Hibbing's principal families. While Shelton was writing Dylan's biography in the 1960s, Dylan told him, "Straighten out in your book that I did not take my name from Dylan Thomas. Dylan Thomas's poetry is for people that aren't really satisfied in their bed, for people who dig masculine romance." At the University of Minnesota, Dylan told a few friends that Dillon was his mother's maiden name, which was untrue. He later told reporters that he had an uncle named Dillon. Shelton added that only when he reached New York in 1961 did he begin to spell his name "Dylan", by which time he was acquainted with the life and work of Dylan Thomas. Shelton (2011), pp. 44–45.) In a 2004 interview, he said, "You're born, you know, the wrong names, wrong parents. I mean, that happens. You call yourself what you want to call yourself. This is the land of the free." Dylan's readings influenced him, notably Moby-Dick, All Quiet on the Western Front and the Odyssey.

== Career ==
=== 1960–1962: Move to New York and stardom ===
Bob Dylan, 1963 promo photo by Don Hunstein for The Times They Are a-Changin' in a recording studio

Dylan dropped out of college in May 1960 at the end of his first year. In January 1961, he traveled to New York City to perform and to visit his hero Woody Guthrie at Greystone Park Psychiatric Hospital in New Jersey. Guthrie had been a revelation: "The songs themselves had the infinite sweep of humanity in them. ... I said to myself I was going to be Guthrie's greatest disciple." His songwriting was also shaped by Robert Johnson's blues and the "architectural forms" of Hank Williams's country songs.

From February 1961, Dylan played at Greenwich Village clubs, befriending and borrowing material from folk singers, including Dave Van Ronk, Fred Neil, Odetta, the New Lost City Ramblers and the Clancy Brothers. In September, Robert Shelton boosted Dylan's career with an enthusiastic review of his performance at Gerde's Folk City. That month, Dylan played harmonica on Carolyn Hester's third album, bringing him to the attention of producer John Hammond, who signed Dylan to Columbia Records. Dylan's debut album, Bob Dylan, (1962), consisted of traditional folk, blues and gospel material with just two original compositions, "Talkin' New York" and "Song to Woody". The album sold 5,000 copies in its first year, just breaking even.

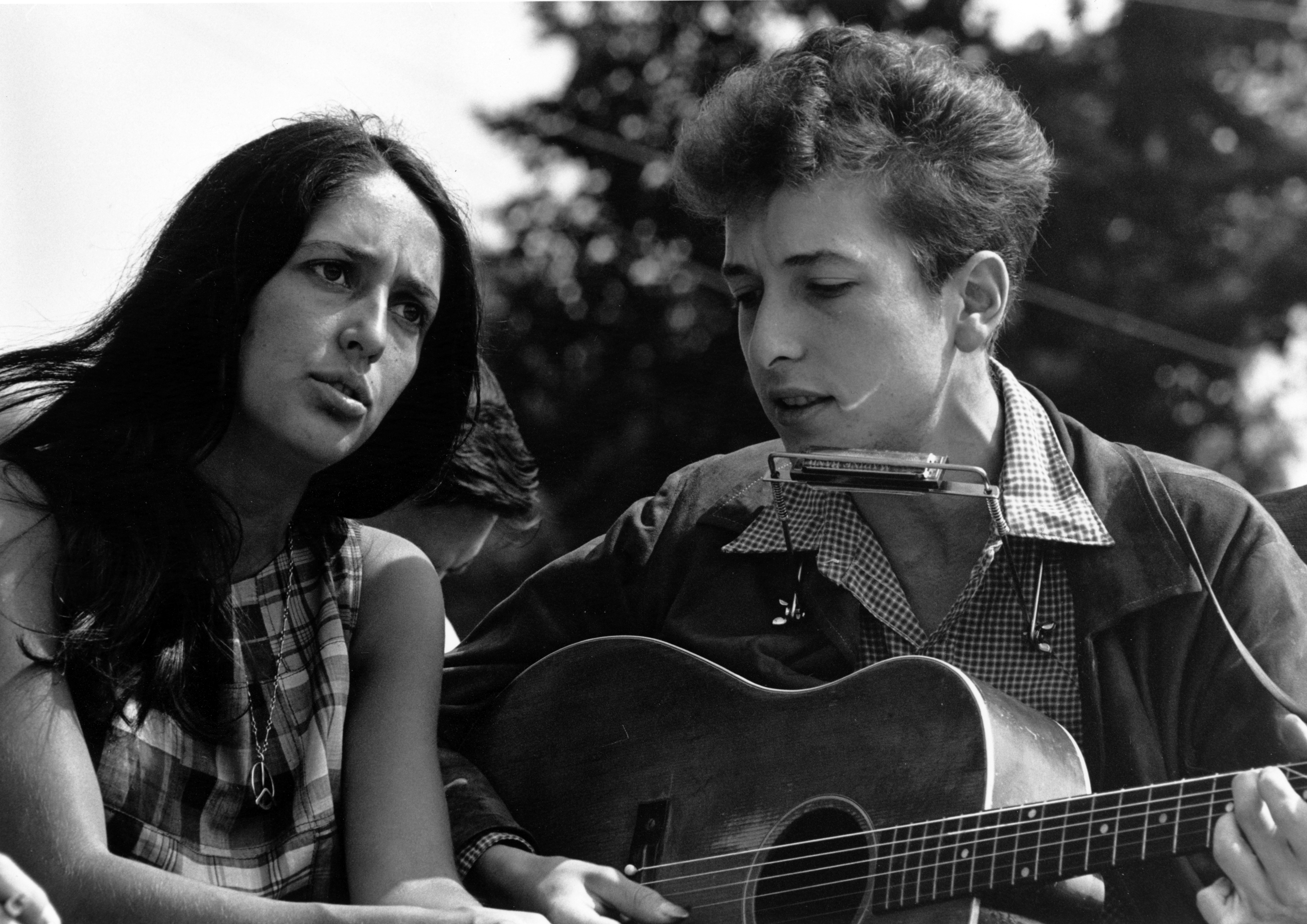
Joan Baez and Dylan during the civil rights "March on Washington for Jobs and Freedom", August 28, 1963

On August 9, 1962, Dylan legally changed his name to Robert Dylan in the St. Louis County Court, Hibbing. His father, Abraham Zimmerman, was the witness. That month, Dylan signed a management contract with Albert Grossman. Grossman remained Dylan's manager until 1970, and was known for his sometimes confrontational personality and protective loyalty. Dylan said, "He was kind of like a Colonel Tom Parker figure ... you could smell him coming." Tension between Grossman and John Hammond led to Hammond's suggesting that Dylan work with the jazz producer Tom Wilson, who produced several tracks for Dylan's second album and went on to produce Dylan's next three albums.

Dylan made his first visit to England from December 1962 to January 1963. He was invited to perform in Philip Saville's production of Madhouse on Castle Street on BBC Television. While in London, Dylan performed at several folk clubs, including the Troubadour, Les Cousins, and Bunjies. He also learned material from UK performers, including Martin Carthy.

The Freewheelin' Bob Dylan (1963) established him as a significant singer-songwriter. It featured many protest songs, inspired by Guthrie and Pete Seeger's passion for contemporary songs. "Oxford Town" was an oblique account of James Meredith's ordeal as the first Black student at the University of Mississippi. The album's first song, "Blowin' in the Wind", partly derived its melody from the traditional slave song "No More Auction Block", while its lyrics wondered whether war and injustice would ever end. The song was widely recorded, becoming a hit for Peter, Paul, and Mary. With its apocalyptic premonitions, "A Hard Rain's a-Gonna Fall" gained resonance with the Cuban Missile Crisis which commenced a month after the song's first performance. (Note: In a May 1963 interview with Studs Terkel, Dylan broadened the meaning of the song, saying "the pellets of poison flooding the waters" refers to "the lies people are told on their radios and in their newspapers." Cott (2006), p. 8.) Richard Corliss called it a "Chartres of apocalyptic imagery. Upon hearing it, Allen Ginsberg "wept. 'Cause it seemed that the torch had been passed to another generation."

Dylan's topical songs led to him being seen as more than just a songwriter. Janet Maslin wrote of Freewheelin':

These were the songs that established [Dylan] as the voice of his generation —someone who implicitly understood how concerned young Americans felt about nuclear disarmament and the growing civil rights movement: his mixture of moral authority and nonconformity was perhaps the most timely of his attributes. (Note: The title "Spokesman of a Generation" was viewed by Dylan with disgust in later years; in his memoir, Chronicles, he wrote: "The press never let up. Once in a while I would have to rise up and offer myself for an interview so they wouldn't beat the door down. Later an article would hit the streets with the headline 'Spokesman Denies That He's A Spokesman.' I felt like a piece of meat that someone had thrown to the dogs." Dylan (2004), p.119)

Freewheelin' also included love songs and surreal talking blues. Humor was an important part of Dylan's persona, and the range of material on the album impressed listeners, including the Beatles. George Harrison said: "We just played it, just wore it out. The content of the song lyrics and just the attitude—it was incredibly original and wonderful."

The rough edge of Dylan's voice unsettled some and attracted others. Joyce Carol Oates wrote: "When we first heard this raw, very young, and seemingly untrained voice, frankly nasal, as if sandpaper could sing, the effect was dramatic and electrifying." Many early Dylan songs reached the public through more palatable versions by other performers, such as Joan Baez, who became Dylan's advocate and lover. Baez was influential in bringing Dylan to prominence by recording several of his early songs and inviting him on stage during her concerts.

=== 1963–1965: Protest music and Another Side ===
"The Times They Are a-Changin'"
Dylan said of "The Times They Are a-Changin'": "This was definitely a song with a purpose. I wanted to write a big song, some kind of theme song, with short concise verses that piled up on each other in a hypnotic way. The civil rights movement and the folk music movement were pretty close and allied together at that time."

In May 1963, Dylan's political profile rose when he walked out of The Ed Sullivan Show. During rehearsals, Dylan had been told by CBS television's head of program practices that "Talkin' John Birch Paranoid Blues" was potentially libelous to the John Birch Society. Rather than comply with censorship, Dylan refused to appear. Dylan and Baez were prominent in the civil rights movement, singing together at the March on Washington on August 28, 1963. Dylan performed "Only a Pawn in Their Game" and "When the Ship Comes In".

The Times They Are a-Changin' (1964) reflected a politicized Dylan. The songs often took on curent events, with "Only a Pawn in Their Game" addressing the murder of civil rights worker Medgar Evers, and "The Lonesome Death of Hattie Carroll" the death of Black hotel barmaid Hattie Carroll at the hands of young White socialite William Zantzinger. "Ballad of Hollis Brown" and "North Country Blues" addressed despair engendered by the breakdown of farming and mining communities. The final track was Dylan's angry response to a hostile profile published in Newsweek. Per Clinton Heylin, the profile wrote about "the way the Bar Mitzvah boy from Hibbing, Minnesota, had reinvented himself as the prince of protest", emphasising his birth name, his attendance at the University of Minnesota, and his close relationship with his parents from whom he claimed to be estranged. "Restless Farewell" ends with his vow to "make my stand/ And remain as I am/ And bid farewell and not give a damn".

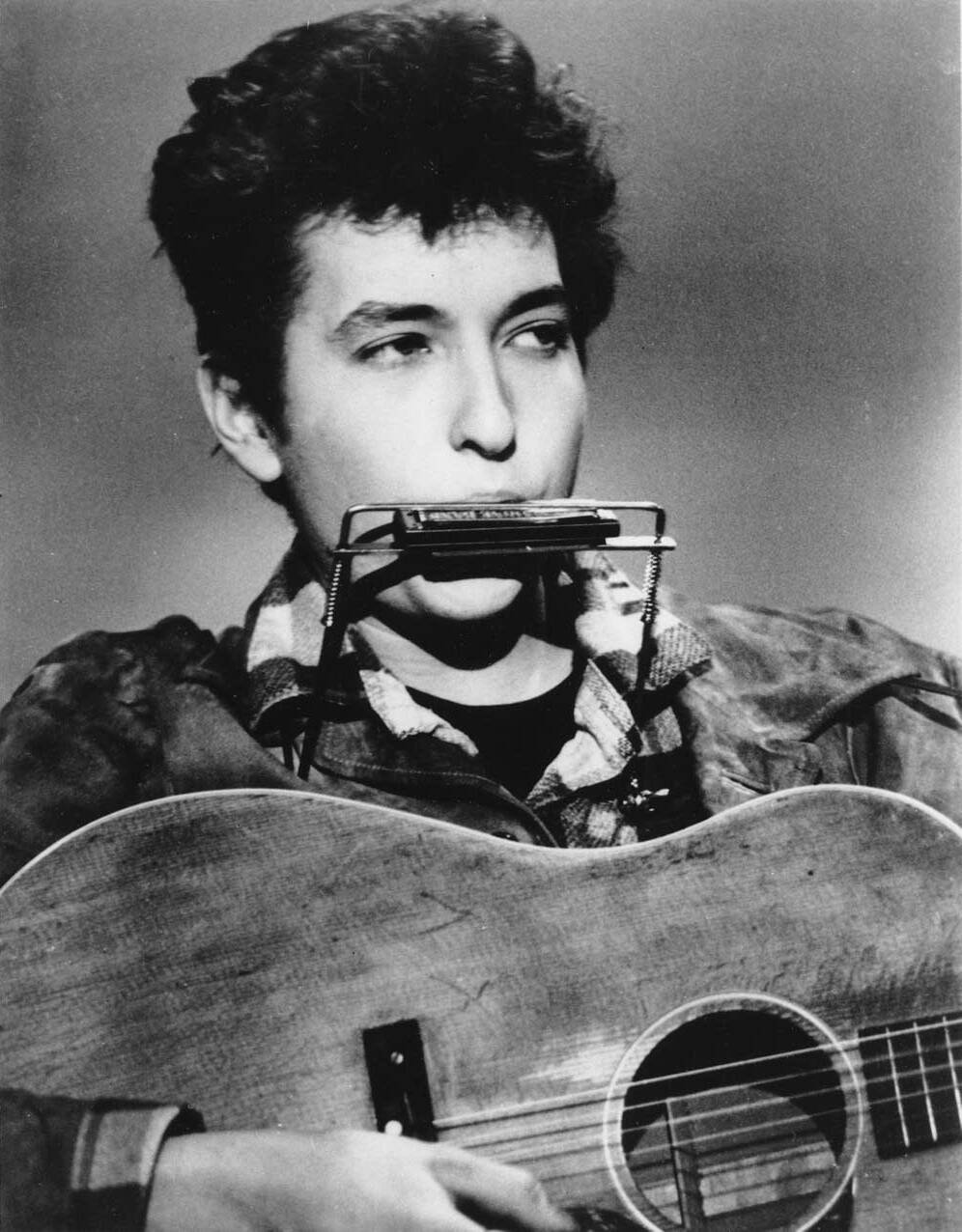
Bob Dylan performing in 1963

By the end of 1963, Dylan felt manipulated and artistically constrained by the folk and protest movements. Accepting the "Tom Paine Award" from the Emergency Civil Liberties Committee three weeks after the assassination of John F. Kennedy, an intoxicated Dylan questioned the role of the committee, characterized the members as old and balding, and claimed to see something of himself and of every man in Kennedy's assassin, Lee Harvey Oswald.

Johnny Cash defended Dylan in a letter to Broadside in March 1964, ending with the injunction: "Don’t bad-mouth him 'till you hear him, let him start by continuing / He’s almost brand new, SHUT UP! … AND LET HIM SING!" Dylan recallered "the letter meant the world to me." Cash and Dylan met for the first time at the Newport Folk Festival in July 1964 and became friends.

Another Side of Bob Dylan (1964) had a lighter mood. The humorous Dylan reemerged on "I Shall Be Free No. 10" and "Motorpsycho Nightmare". "Spanish Harlem Incident" and "To Ramona" are passionate love songs, while "Black Crow Blues" and "I Don't Believe You (She Acts Like We Never Have Met)" suggest the rock and roll soon to dominate Dylan's music. "It Ain't Me Babe", on the surface a song about spurned love, has been described as a rejection of the role of political spokesman thrust upon him. His new direction was signaled by two lengthy songs: the impressionistic "Chimes of Freedom", which sets social commentary against a metaphorical landscape in a style characterized by Ginsberg as "chains of flashing images," (Note: In an interview with Seth Goddard for Life (July 5, 2001) Ginsberg said Dylan's technique had been inspired by Jack Kerouac: "(Dylan) pulled Mexico City Blues from my hand and started reading it and I said, 'What do you know about that?' He said, 'Somebody handed it to me in '59 in St. Paul and it blew my mind.' So I said 'Why?' He said, 'It was the first poetry that spoke to me in my own language.' So those chains of flashing images you get in Dylan, like 'the motorcycle black Madonna two-wheeled gypsy queen and her silver- studded phantom lover,' they're influenced by Kerouac's chains of flashing images and spontaneous writing, and that spreads out into the people". Schumacher, Michael, ed. (2017). First Thought: Conversations with Allen Ginsberg. U of Minnesota Press. pp. 322–. ISBN 978-1-4529-4995-6.) and "My Back Pages", which attacks the simplistic seriousness of his own topical songs and seems to predict the backlash he was about to encounter from his former champions.

In late 1964 and early 1965, Dylan moved from folk songwriter to folk-rock pop-music star. His jeans and work shirts were replaced by a Carnaby Street wardrobe, sunglasses day and night, and pointed "Beatle boots". A London reporter noted "Hair that would set the teeth of a comb on edge. A loud shirt that would dim the neon lights of Leicester Square. He looks like an undernourished cockatoo." Dylan began to spar with interviewers. While on Les Crane's television show, asked about a movie he planned, he told Crane it would be a "cowboy horror movie". Asked if he played the cowboy, Dylan replied, "No, I play my mother."

=== 1965–1969: Going electric and motorcycle accident ===
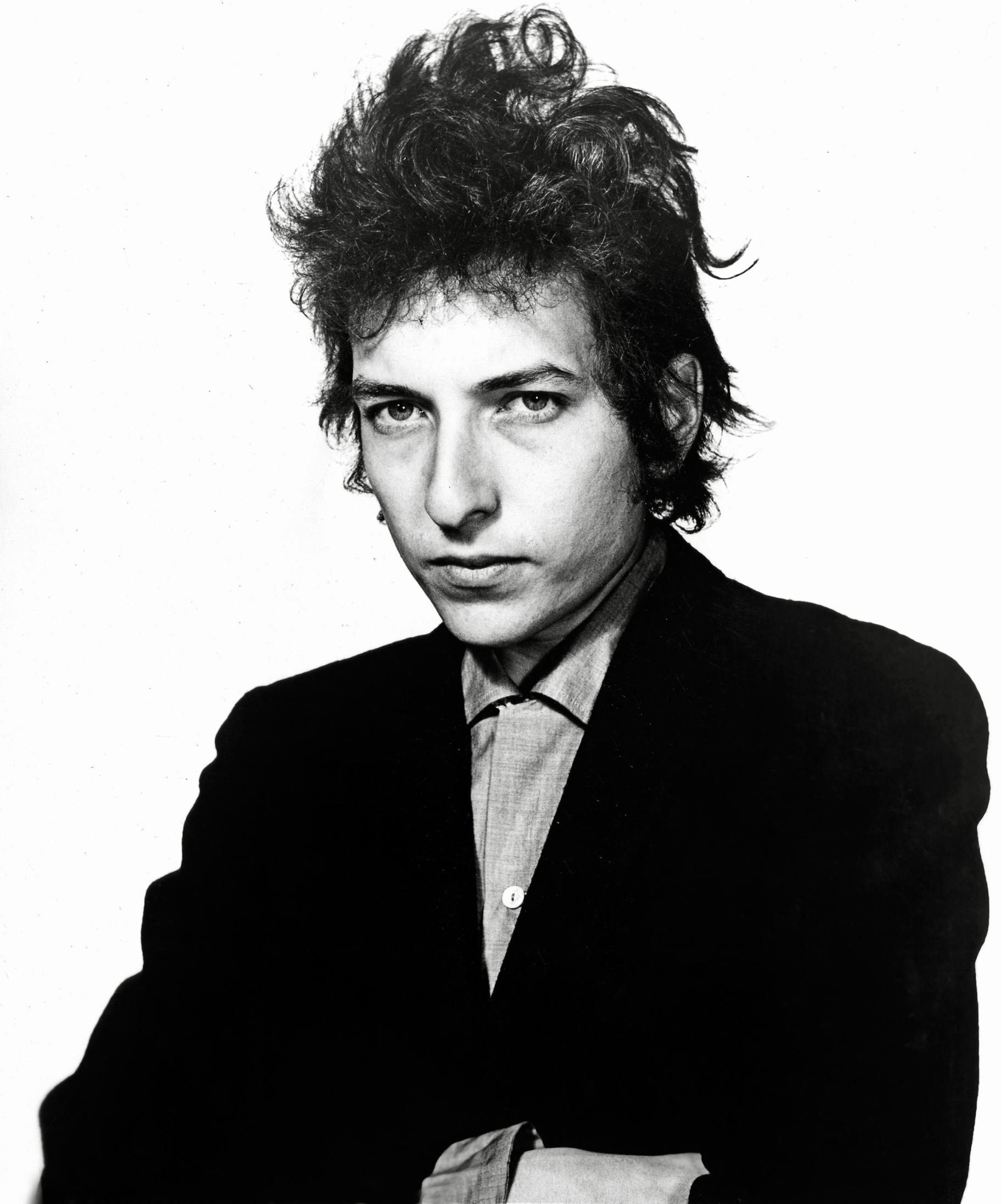
Dylan in 1965

Bringing It All Back Home (1965) featured his first recordings with electric instruments, under producer Tom Wilson's guidance. The first single, "Subterranean Homesick Blues", owed much to Chuck Berry's "Too Much Monkey Business", its free-association lyrics described as harking back to the energy of beat poetry and as a forerunner of rap and hip-hop. The album's second side contained four long songs on which Dylan accompanied himself on acoustic guitar and harmonica. "Mr. Tambourine Man" became one of his best-known songs when the Byrds recorded an electric version that reached number one in the US and UK. The album's final songs, "It's All Over Now, Baby Blue" and "It's Alright, Ma (I'm Only Bleeding)", are among Dylan's most important compositions.

In May 1965, Dylan played an eight-concert tour in England, immortalized in D. A. Pennebaker's documentary Dont Look Back (1967). The movie opens with an early music video for "Subterranean Homesick Blues" in which Dylan, instead of lipsynching the lyrics, dropped cue cards containing key words to the ground. Pennebaker said the sequence was Dylan's idea; it has been imitated in music videos and advertisements.

On July 25, 1965, headlining the Newport Folk Festival, Dylan performed his first electric set since high school with a pickup group featuring Mike Bloomfield on guitar and Al Kooper on organ. Dylan had appeared at Newport in 1963 and 1964, but in 1965 he was met with cheering and booing and left the stage after three songs. One version has it that the boos were from folk fans whom Dylan had alienated by appearing, unexpectedly, with an electric guitar. Murray Lerner, who filmed the performance, said: "I absolutely think that they were booing Dylan going electric." Others claim audience members were upset by poor sound and a short set.

Dylan's performance provoked a hostile response from the folk music establishment. In the September issue of Sing Out!, Ewan MacColl wrote: "Our traditional songs and ballads are the creations of extraordinarily talented artists working inside disciplines formulated over time.... 'But what of Bobby Dylan?' scream the outraged teenagers.... Only a completely non-critical audience, nourished on the watery pap of pop music, could have fallen for such tenth-rate drivel". On July 29, four days after Newport, Dylan was back in the studio in New York, recording "Positively 4th Street". The lyrics contained images of vengeance and paranoia, and have been interpreted as Dylan's put-down of former friends from the folk community he had known in clubs along West 4th Street.

Highway 61 Revisited and Blonde on Blonde

"Like a Rolling Stone"
Dylan's 1965 hit single, which appeared on the album Highway 61 Revisited. In 2004, it was chosen as the greatest song of all time by Rolling Stone magazine.

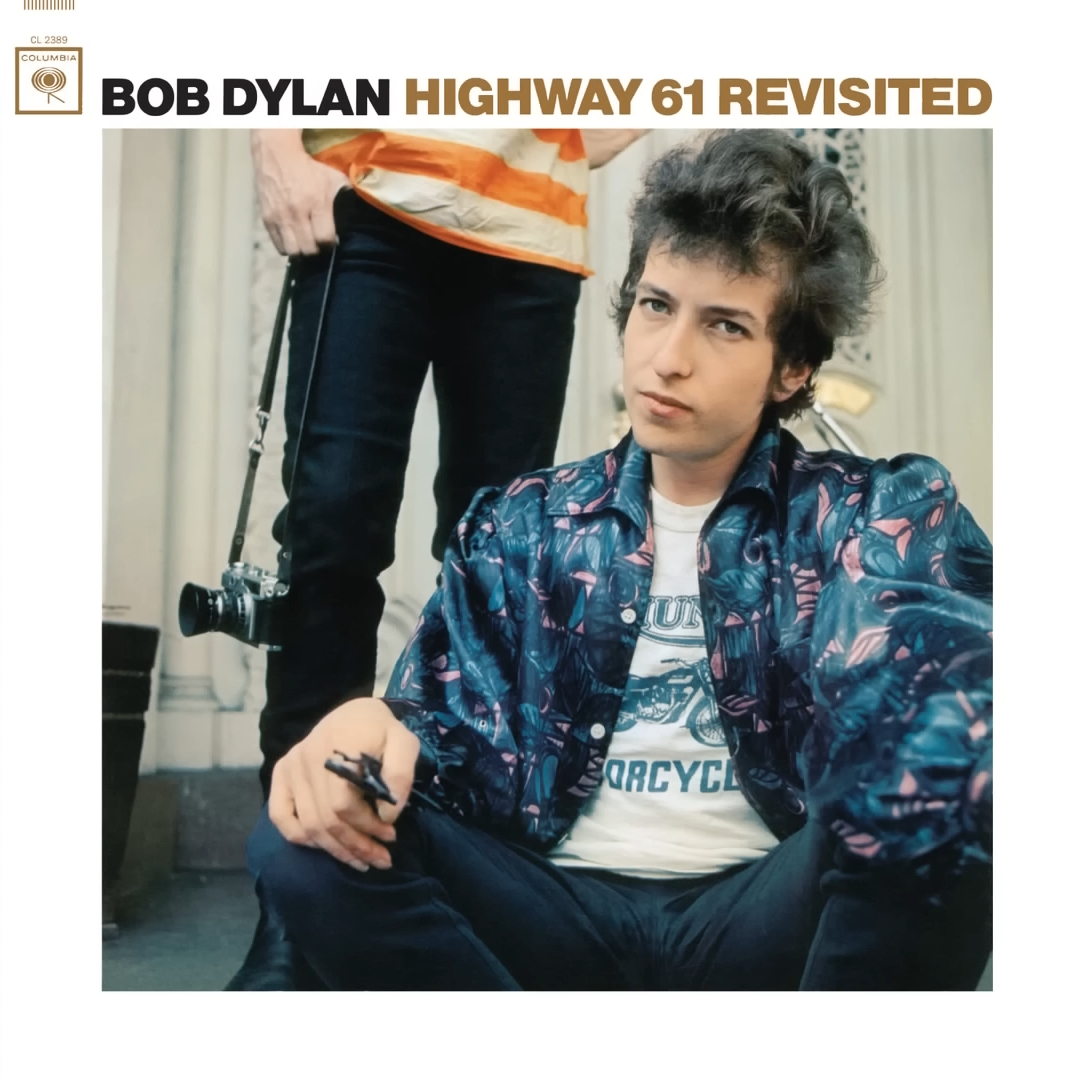
The album cover of Highway 61 Revisited, an iconic image of Dylan

Dylan's six-minute single "Like a Rolling Stone" peaked at number two in the US chart in July 1965. Bruce Springsteen recalled hearing it for the first time: "that snare shot sounded like somebody'd kicked open the door to your mind." The song opened Highway 61 Revisited, named after the road that led from Dylan's Minnesota to the musical hotbed of New Orleans. The songs were in the same vein as the single, flavored by Mike Bloomfield's blues guitar and Al Kooper's organ riffs. "Desolation Row", backed by acoustic guitar and understated bass, offers the sole exception, with Dylan alluding to figures in Western culture in a song described by Andy Gill as "an 11-minute epic of entropy, which takes the form of a Fellini-esque parade of grotesques and oddities featuring a huge cast of celebrated characters". The poet Philip Larkin praised the album: "Dylan's cawing, derisive voice is probably well suited to his material ... and his guitar adapts itself to rock ('Highway 61') and ballad ('Queen Jane'). There is a marathon 'Desolation Row' which has an enchanting tune and mysterious, possibly half-baked words."

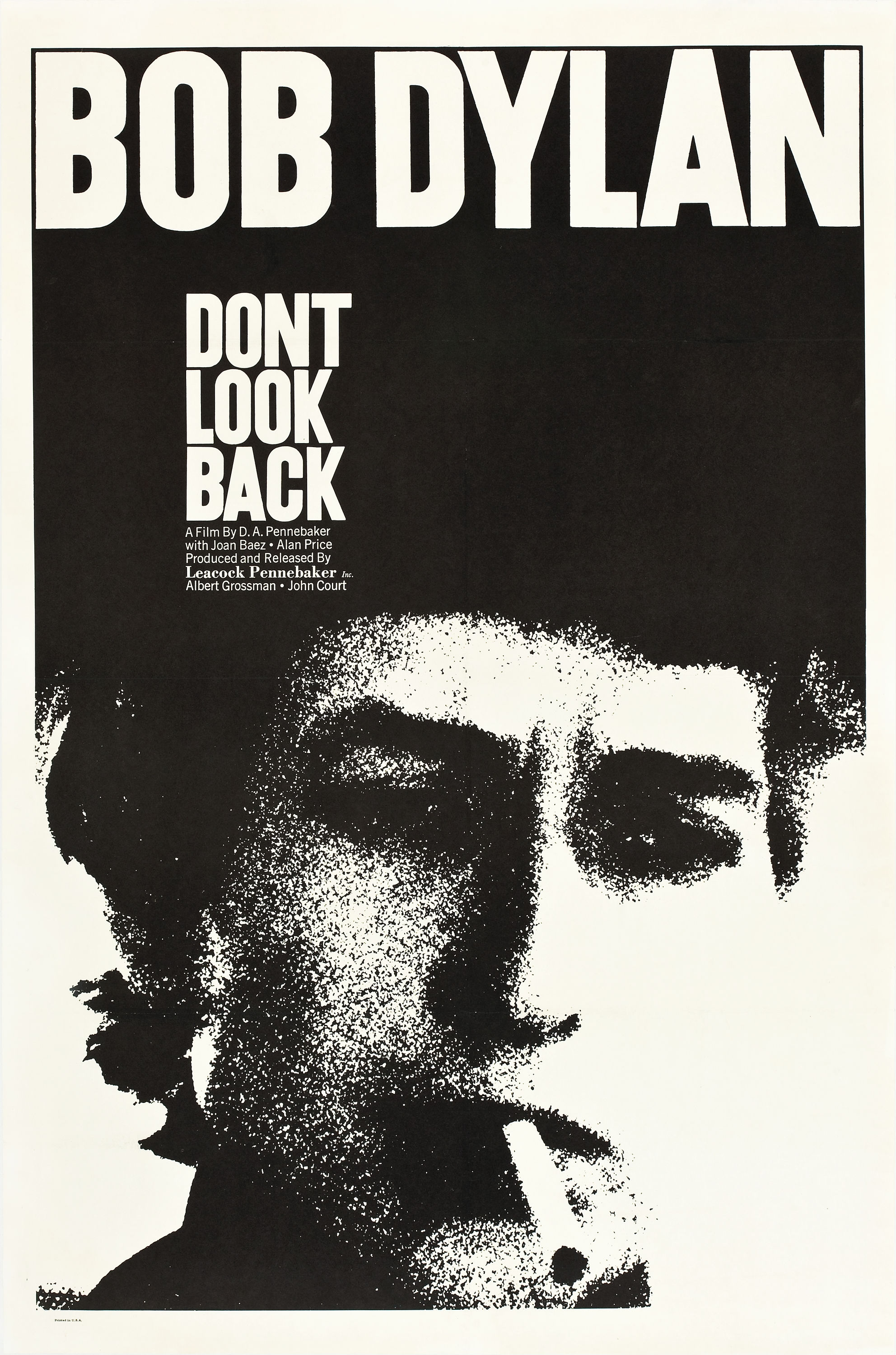
The cinéma vérité documentary Dont Look Back (1967) follows Dylan on his 1965 tour of England. An early music video for "Subterranean Homesick Blues" was used as the film's opening segment.

From September 24, 1965, in Austin Texas, Dylan toured the US and Canada for six months, backed by the five musicians from the Hawks who became the Band. While Dylan and the Hawks met increasingly receptive audiences, their studio efforts floundered. Producer Bob Johnston persuaded Dylan to record in Nashville in February 1966, and surrounded him with top-notch session men. At Dylan's insistence, Robertson and Kooper came from New York City to play on the sessions. The Nashville sessions produced the double album Blonde on Blonde (1966), featuring what Dylan called "that thin wild mercury sound". Kooper described it as "taking two cultures and smashing them together with a huge explosion": the musical worlds of Nashville and of the "quintessential New York hipster" Bob Dylan.

On November 22, 1965, Dylan quietly married 25-year-old former model Sara Lownds. During a break from his tour in early 1966, Dylan's friend Barbara Rubin arranged for him to sit for one of Andy Warhol's Screen Tests at the Factory. During the visit, Warhol gave Dylan the painting Double Elvis, which Dylan later traded for a sofa.

Dylan toured Australia and Europe in April and May 1966. Each show was split in two. Dylan performed solo during the first half, accompanying himself on acoustic guitar and harmonica. In the second, backed by the Hawks, he played electrically amplified music. This contrast provoked many fans, who jeered and slow clapped. The tour culminated in a raucous confrontation between Dylan and his audience at the Manchester Free Trade Hall in England on May 17, 1966. A recording of this concert was released in 1998: The Bootleg Series Vol. 4: Bob Dylan Live 1966. At the climax of the evening, a member of the audience, angered by Dylan's electric backing, shouted: "Judas!" to which Dylan responded, "I don't believe you ... You're a liar!" Dylan turned to his band and said, "Play it fucking loud!"

Dylan was described as exhausted and behaving as if "he was on some kind of death trip" during his 1966 tour. D. A. Pennebaker described Dylan as "taking a lot of amphetamine and who-knows-what-else". In an interview with Jann Wenner, Dylan said, "I was on the road for almost five years. It wore me down. I was on drugs, a lot of things ... just to keep going, you know?"

On July 29, 1966, Dylan crashed his Triumph Tiger 100 motorcycle near his home in Woodstock, New York. Dylan said he broke several vertebrae in his neck. The accident remains mysterious since no ambulance was called to the scene and Dylan was not hospitalized. Dylan's biographers have written that the crash offered him the chance to escape the pressures around him. Dylan concurred: "I had been in a motorcycle accident and I'd been hurt, but I recovered. Truth was that I wanted to get out of the rat race."

He made very few public appearances, and did not tour again for almost eight years. Secluded from public gaze, Dylan recorded over 100 songs during 1967 at his Woodstock home and in the basement of the Hawks' nearby house, "Big Pink". These songs were initially offered as demos for other artists to record and were hits for Julie Driscoll, Manfred Mann and the Byrds. The public heard these recordings when Great White Wonder, the first "bootleg recording", appeared in West Coast shops in July 1969, containing Dylan material recorded in Minneapolis in 1961 and seven Basement Tapes songs. This record gave birth to a minor industry in the illicit release of recordings by Dylan and other major rock artists. Columbia released a Basement selection in 1975 as The Basement Tapes.

In late 1967, Dylan returned to the studio in Nashville, accompanied by acoustic musicians on bass, drums and steel guitar. The result was John Wesley Harding, a record of short songs drawing on the American West and the Bible. The sparse structure and instrumentation, with lyrics that took the Judeo-Christian tradition seriously, was a departure from Dylan's previous work. It included "All Along the Watchtower", famously covered by Jimi Hendrix. (Note: Later recorded by Jimi Hendrix, whose version Dylan acknowledged as definitive.) Woody Guthrie died in October 1967, and Dylan made his first live appearance in twenty months at a memorial concert held at Carnegie Hall on January 20, 1968, backed by the Band.

"Lay Lady Lay"
"Lay Lady Lay", on the country album Nashville Skyline, has been one of Dylan's biggest hits, reaching No. 7 in the US.

Nashville Skyline (1969) featured Nashville musicians, a mellow-voiced Dylan, a duet with Johnny Cash on "Girl from the North Country" and the single "Lay Lady Lay". Variety wrote, "Dylan is definitely doing something that can be called singing. Somehow he has managed to add an octave to his range." It influenced the nascent genre of country rock. In August 1969, Dylan traveled to England to top the bill at the Isle of Wight Festival, after rejecting overtures to appear at the Woodstock Festival closer to home.

=== 1970–1979: Return to touring and Christian music ===
Greil Marcus, upon hearing Self Portrait, (1970), asked "What is this shit?" It was a double LP including few original songs and was poorly received. The poet Archibald MacLeish asked Dylan to write songs for a musical based on "The Devil and Daniel Webster". Creative differences led to Dylan's departure, but much of the material made its way onto New Morning (1970). It included "Day of the Locusts", an account of receiving an honorary degree from Princeton on June 9, 1970. Olivia Newton-John covered "If Not For You" on her debut album.

Tarantula, a book of freeform prose-poems, was written by Dylan in a creative burst in 1964–65. Dylan shelved his book for several years, apparently uncertain of its status, until he suddenly informed Macmillan at the end of 1970 that the time had come to publish it. The book attracted negative reviews but later critics have suggested its affinities with Finnegans Wake and A Season in Hell.

Between March 16 and 19, 1971, Dylan recorded with Leon Russell at Blue Rock, a small studio in Greenwich Village. The sessions resulted in "Watching the River Flow" and a new recording of "When I Paint My Masterpiece". On November 4, 1971, Dylan recorded "George Jackson", which he released a week later. For many, the single was a surprising return to protest material, mourning the killing of Black Panther George Jackson in San Quentin State Prison. Dylan's surprise appearance at George Harrison's Concert for Bangladesh on August 1, 1971, attracted attention.

Dylan joined Sam Peckinpah's film Pat Garrett and Billy the Kid (1973), providing the soundtrack and playing "Alias", a member of Billy's gang. Despite the film's failure at the box office, "Knockin' on Heaven's Door" became one of Dylan's most covered songs.

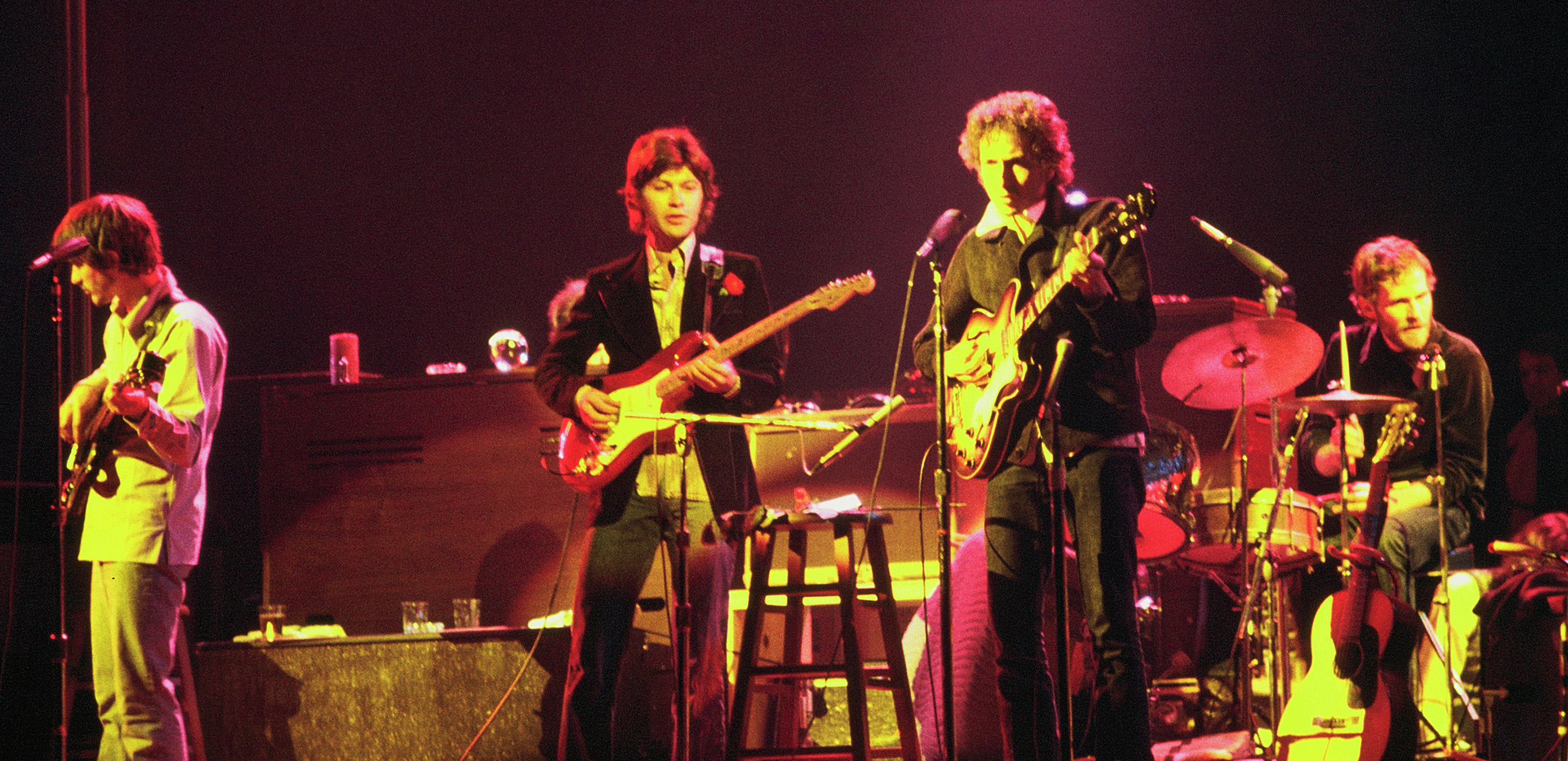
Bob Dylan and the Band commenced their 1974 tour in Chicago on January 3, 1974.

Dylan began 1973 by signing with a new label, David Geffen's Asylum Records, when his contract with Columbia Records expired. Planet Waves (1974) was recorded with the Band as his backing group as they rehearsed for a major tour. It included two versions of "Forever Young", which became one of his most popular songs. As one critic described it, the song projected "something hymnal and heartfelt that spoke of the father in Dylan", and Dylan said "I wrote it thinking about one of my boys and not wanting to be too sentimental". Columbia Records simultaneously released Dylan, a collection of studio outtakes, widely interpreted as a churlish response to Dylan's signing with a rival record label.

In January 1974, Dylan, backed by the Band, embarked on a North American tour of 40 concerts—his first tour for seven years. A live double album, Before the Flood, was released on Asylum Records. Soon, according to Clive Davis, Columbia Records sent word they "will spare nothing to bring Dylan back into the fold". Dylan had second thoughts about Asylum, unhappy that Geffen had sold only 600,000 copies of Planet Waves despite millions of unfulfilled ticket requests for the 1974 tour; he returned to Columbia Records, which reissued his two Asylum albums.

"Tangled Up in Blue"
Dylan said of the opening song from Blood on the Tracks: "I was trying to deal with the concept of time, and the way the characters change from the first person to the third person, and you're never sure if the first person is talking or the third person. But as you look at the whole thing it really doesn't matter."

After the tour, Dylan and Sara became estranged. He filled three small notebooks with songs about relationships and ruptures, and recorded Blood on the Tracks in September 1974. Dylan delayed the album's release and re-recorded half the songs at Sound 80 Studios in Minneapolis with production assistance from his brother, David Zimmerman. Blood on the Tracks (1975) was released to mixed reviews. 'Jon Landau wrote that "the record has been made with typical shoddiness". Critics came to see it as one of Dylan's masterpieces. Bill Wyman wrote:

Blood on the Tracks is his only flawless album and his best produced; the songs, each of them, are constructed in disciplined fashion. It is his kindest album and most dismayed, and seems in hindsight to have achieved a sublime balance between the logorrhea-plagued excesses of his mid-1960s output and the self-consciously simple compositions of his post-accident years.

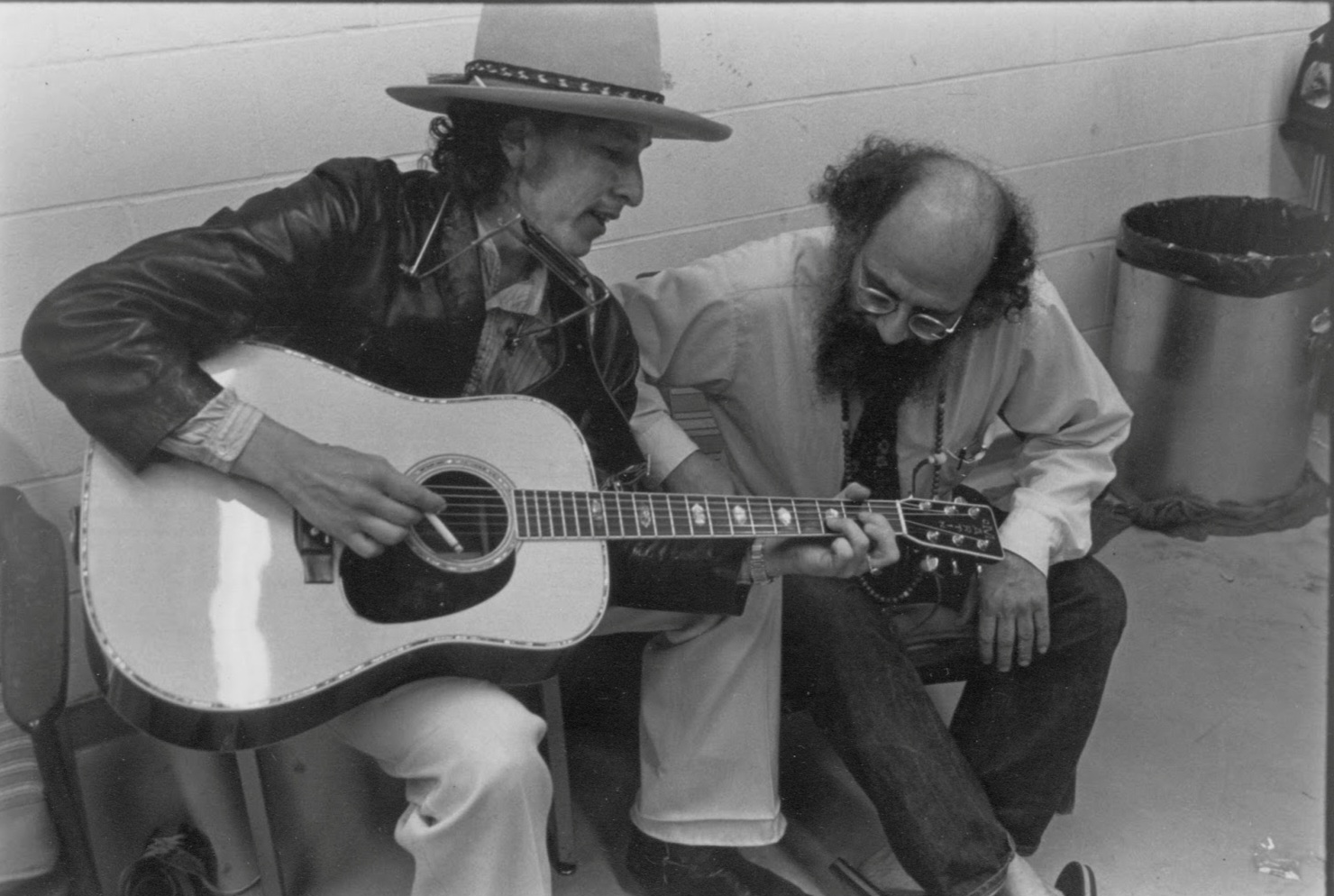
Bob Dylan with Allen Ginsberg on the Rolling Thunder Revue in 1975

In the middle of 1975, Dylan championed boxer Rubin "Hurricane" Carter, imprisoned for triple murder, with his ballad "Hurricane" making the case for Carter's innocence. Despite its length—over eight minutes—the song was released as a single, peaking at 33 on the US Billboard chart, and performed at every 1975 date of Dylan's next tour, the Rolling Thunder Revue. Running through late 1975 and again through early 1976, the tour featured about one hundred friends from the Greenwich Village folk scene, among them Joan Baez, Ramblin' Jack Elliott, T-Bone Burnett, Joni Mitchell, David Mansfield, Roger McGuinn, Mick Ronson, Ronee Blakely and Scarlet Rivera, whom Dylan discovered walking down the street, her violin case on her back. The tour encompassed the release of Desire (1976 ). Many of Desire's songs featured a travelogue-like narrative style, influenced by Dylan's new collaborator, playwright Jacques Levy. The 1976 half of the tour was documented by a TV concert special, Hard Rain, and the LP Hard Rain.

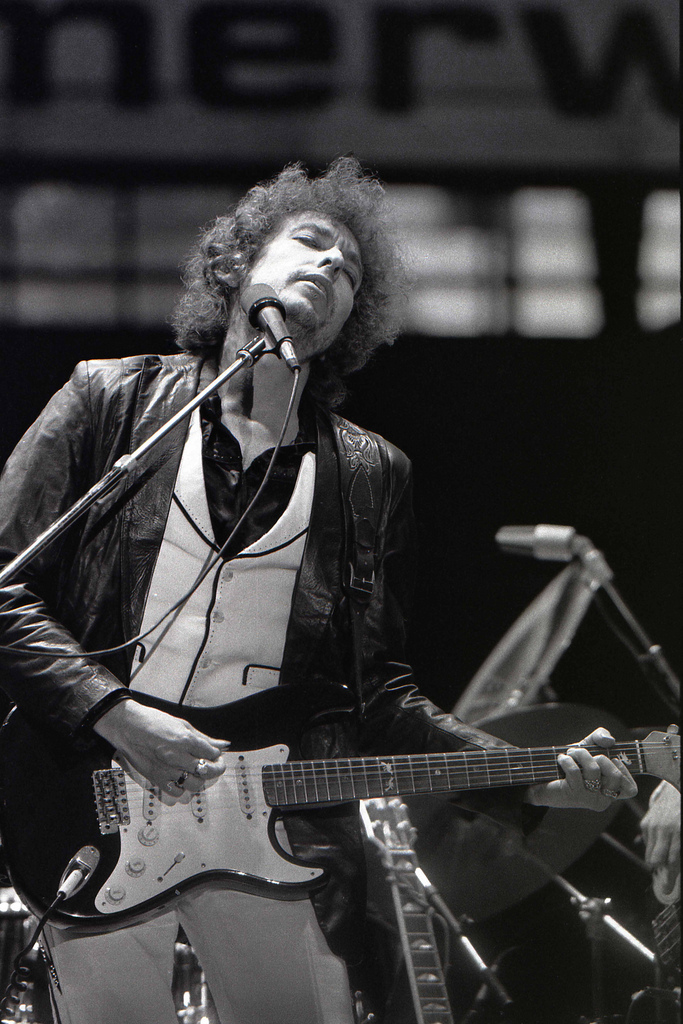
Dylan performing in the De Kuip Stadium, Rotterdam, June 23, 1978

The 1975 Rolling Thunder Revue also provided the backdrop to Dylan's film Renaldo and Clara, a sprawling narrative mixed with concert footage. Actor and playwright Sam Shepard accompanied the Revue to serve as screenwriter, but most of the film was improvised. Released in 1978, it received negative, sometimes scathing, reviews. Later in the year, a two-hour edit, dominated by the concert performances, was more widely released. In November 1976, Dylan appeared at the Band's farewell concert with Muddy Waters, Van Morrison, Eric Clapton, Neil Young and Joni Mitchell. Martin Scorsese's concert film The Last Waltz (1978) included most of Dylan's set.

Dylan embarked on the 1978 Tour, performing 114 shows in Japan, the Far East, Europe and North America, to a total audience of two million. Dylan assembled an eight-piece band and three backing singers. When Dylan brought the tour to the US in September 1978, the press described the look and sound as a "Las Vegas Tour". The 1978 tour grossed more than $20 million, and Dylan told the Los Angeles Times that he had debts because "I had a couple of bad years. I put a lot of money into the movie, built a big house ... and it costs a lot to get divorced in California." Dylan took the same band into Rundown Studios in Santa Monica, California, to record Street-Legal (1978). Critic Michael Gray wrote Street-Legal was "after Blood On The Tracks, arguably Dylan's best record of the 1970s, a crucial album documenting a crucial period in Dylan's own life". However, it had poor sound and mixing (attributed to Dylan's studio practices), muddying the instrumental detail until a remastered release in 1999 restored some of the songs' strengths.

"Gotta Serve Somebody"
Dylan took five months off at the beginning of 1979 to attend Bible school. His subsequent album Slow Train Coming reached No. 3 on the US Billboard 200 chart and included this Grammy-winning song.

In the late 1970s, Dylan converted to Evangelical Christianity, undertaking a three-month discipleship course run by the Association of Vineyard Churches. He released three albums of contemporary gospel music. Slow Train Coming (1979) featured Dire Straits guitarist Mark Knopfler and was produced by veteran R&B producer Jerry Wexler. Wexler said that Dylan had tried to evangelize him during the recording. He replied: "Bob, you're dealing with a 62-year-old Jewish atheist. Let's just make an album." Dylan won the Grammy Award for Best Male Rock Vocal Performance for "Gotta Serve Somebody". When touring in late 1979 and early 1980, Dylan delivered declarations of his faith from the stage, such as:

Years ago they ... said I was a prophet. I used to say, "No I'm not a prophet", they say "Yes you are, you're a prophet." I said, "No it's not me." They used to say "You sure are a prophet." They used to convince me I was a prophet. Now I come out and say Jesus Christ is the answer. They say, "Bob Dylan's no prophet." They just can't handle it.

Dylan's Christianity was unpopular with some fans and musicians. Shortly before his death, John Lennon recorded "Serve Yourself" in response to "Gotta Serve Somebody". Stephen Holden wrote that "neither age (he's now 40) nor his much-publicized conversion to born-again Christianity has altered his essentially iconoclastic temperament".

=== 1980–1989: Career fluctuations ===
Saved (1980) was described by Michael Gray as "the nearest thing to a follow-up album Dylan has ever made, Slow Train Coming II and inferior". His third Christian album, Shot of Love (1981) featured his first secular compositions in more than two years. The lyrics of "Every Grain of Sand" recall William Blake's "Auguries of Innocence". Elvis Costello wrote that "Shot of Love may not be your favorite Bob Dylan record, but it might contain his best song: 'Every Grain of Sand'."

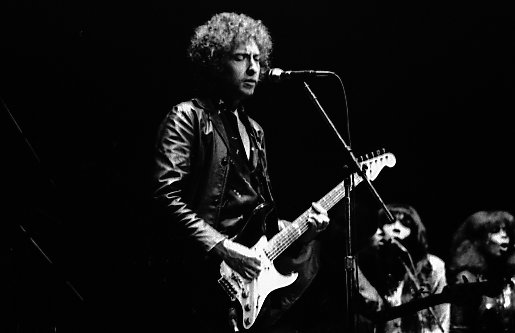
Dylan in Toronto, April 18, 1980

Gray criticized Dylan's 1980s albums for carelessness in the studio and for failing to release his best songs. Infidels (1983) employed Knopfler again as lead guitarist and also as producer; the sessions resulted in several songs that Dylan left off the album. Best regarded of these were "Blind Willie McTell", which was both a tribute to the eponymous blues musician and an evocation of African American history, "Foot of Pride" and "Lord Protect My Child". These three songs were later released on The Bootleg Series Volumes 1–3 (Rare & Unreleased) 1961–1991.

Between July 1984 and March 1985, Dylan recorded Empire Burlesque. Arthur Baker, who had remixed hits for Cyndi Lauper, was asked to engineer and mix the album. Baker said he felt he was hired to make Dylan's album sound "a little bit more contemporary". In 1985 Dylan sang on USA for Africa's famine relief single "We Are the World". He also joined Artists United Against Apartheid, providing vocals for their single "Sun City". On July 13, 1985, he appeared at the Live Aid concert at JFK Stadium, Philadelphia. Backed by Keith Richards and Ronnie Wood, he performed a ragged version of "Ballad of Hollis Brown", a tale of rural poverty, and then said to the worldwide audience: "I hope that some of the money ... maybe they can just take a little bit of it, maybe ... one or two million, maybe ... and use it to pay the mortgages on some of the farms and, the farmers here, owe to the banks". His remarks were widely criticized as inappropriate, but inspired Willie Nelson to organize a concert, Farm Aid, to benefit debt-ridden American farmers.

In October 1985, Dylan released Biograph, a box set featuring 53 tracks, 18 of them previously unreleased. Stephen Thomas Erlewine wrote: "Historically, Biograph is significant not for what it did for Dylan's career, but for establishing the box set, complete with hits and rarities, as a viable part of rock history." Biograph also contained liner notes by Cameron Crowe in which Dylan discussed the origins of some of his songs.

Dylan made a foray into rap when he added vocals to the opening verse of "Street Rock" on Kurtis Blow's Kingdom Blow (1986). Knocked Out Loaded (1986), contained three covers (by Junior Parker, Kris Kristofferson and the gospel hymn "Precious Memories"), plus three collaborations (with Tom Petty, Carole Bayer Sager and Sam Shepard) and two solo compositions. Erlewine wrote: "the record follows too many detours to be consistently compelling, and some of those detours wind down roads that are indisputably dead ends. By 1986, such uneven records weren't entirely unexpected by Dylan, but that didn't make them any less frustrating." It was the first Dylan album since his 1962 debut to fail to make the Top 50. Some critics have called the song Dylan co-wrote with Shepard, "Brownsville Girl", a masterpiece.

In 1986 and 1987, Dylan toured with Tom Petty and the Heartbreakers, sharing vocals with Petty on several songs each night. Dylan toured with the Grateful Dead in 1987, resulting in the live album Dylan & The Dead, which received negative reviews; Erlewine said it was "quite possibly the worst album by either Bob Dylan or the Grateful Dead". Dylan initiated what came to be called the Never Ending Tour on June 7, 1988, performing with a back-up band featuring guitarist G. E. Smith. In 1987, Dylan starred in Richard Marquand's Hearts of Fire as Billy Parker, a washed-up rock star turned chicken farmer whose teenage lover (Fiona) leaves him for a jaded English synth-pop sensation (Rupert Everett). Dylan also contributed two original songs to the soundtrack—"Night After Night", and "Had a Dream About You, Baby", as well as a cover of John Hiatt's "The Usual". The film was a critical and commercial flop.

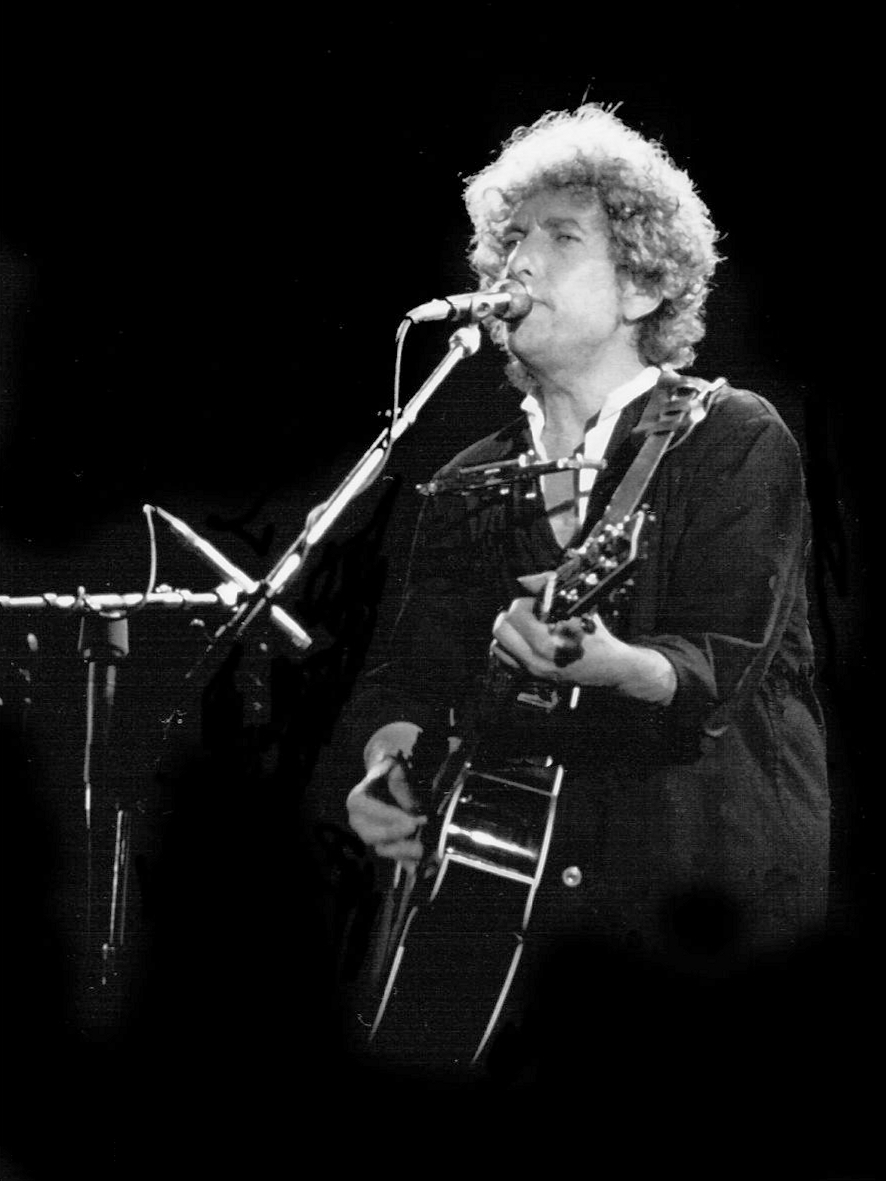
Dylan in Barcelona, Spain, 1984

Down in the Groove (1988) sold even more poorly than Knocked Out Loaded. Gray wrote: "The very title undercuts any idea that inspired work may lie within. Here was a further devaluing of the notion of a new Bob Dylan album as something significant." The critical and commercial disappointment of that album was swiftly followed by the success of the Traveling Wilburys, a supergroup Dylan co-founded with George Harrison, Tom Petty, Jeff Lynne and Roy Orbison. In late 1988, their Traveling Wilburys Vol. 1 reached number three on the US albums chart, featuring songs described as Dylan's most accessible in years. Despite Orbison's death in December 1988, the remaining four recorded a second album in May 1990, Traveling Wilburys Vol. 3.

Dylan finished the decade on a critical high note with Oh Mercy (1989), produced by Daniel Lanois. Gray praised the album as "Attentively written, vocally distinctive, musically warm, and uncompromisingly professional, this cohesive whole is the nearest thing to a great Bob Dylan album in the 1980s." "Most of the Time", a lost-love song, was prominently featured in the film High Fidelity (2000), while "What Was It You Wanted" has been interpreted both as a catechism and a wry comment on the expectations of critics and fans.

=== 1990–1999: Return to folk music and resurgence ===
Under the Red Sky (1990) was an about-face from the serious Oh Mercy. It included several apparently simple songs, including "Under the Red Sky" and "Wiggle Wiggle". The album was dedicated to "Gabby Goo Goo", a nickname for the daughter of Dylan and Carolyn Dennis, Desiree Gabrielle Dennis-Dylan, who was four. Musicians on the album included George Harrison, Slash, David Crosby, Bruce Hornsby, Stevie Ray Vaughan and Elton John. The record received negative reviews and sold poorly. In 1990 and 1991 Dylan was described by his biographers as drinking heavily, impairing his performances on stage. In an interview with Rolling Stone, Dylan dismissed allegations that drinking was interfering with his music: "That's completely inaccurate. I can drink or not drink. I don't know why people would associate drinking with anything I do, really".

Defilement and remorse were themes Dylan addressed when he received a Grammy Lifetime Achievement Award from Jack Nicholson in February 1991. The event coincided with the start of the Gulf War and Dylan played "Masters of War"; Rolling Stone called his performance "almost unintelligible". He made a short speech: "My daddy once said to me, he said, 'Son, it is possible for you to become so defiled in this world that your own mother and father will abandon you. If that happens, God will believe in your ability to mend your own ways'". This was a paraphrase of 19th-century Orthodox Rabbi Samson Raphael Hirsch's commentary on Psalm 27. On October 16, 1992, the thirtieth anniversary of Dylan's debut album was celebrated with a concert at Madison Square Garden, christened "Bobfest" by Neil Young and featuring John Mellencamp, Stevie Wonder, Lou Reed, Eddie Vedder, Dylan and others. It was recorded as the live album The 30th Anniversary Concert Celebration.

Dylan returned to his roots with two albums covering traditional folk and blues songs: Good as I Been to You (1992) and World Gone Wrong (1993), backed solely by an acoustic guitar. Many critics and fans noted the quiet beauty of the song "Lone Pilgrim", written by a 19th-century teacher. In August 1994, he played at Woodstock '94; Rolling Stone called his performance "triumphant". In November, Dylan recorded two live shows for MTV Unplugged. He said his wish to perform traditional songs was overruled by Sony executives who insisted on hits. The resulting album, MTV Unplugged, included "John Brown", an unreleased 1962 song about how enthusiasm for war ends in disillusionment.

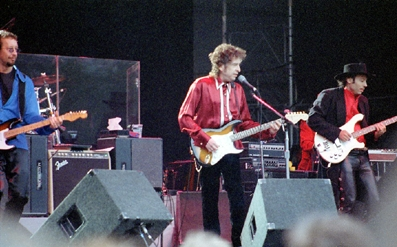
Dylan performs during the 1996 Lida Festival in Stockholm

With a collection of songs reportedly written while snowed in on his Minnesota ranch, Dylan booked recording time with Daniel Lanois at Miami's Criteria Studios in January 1997. The subsequent recording sessions were, by some accounts, fraught with musical tension. Before the album's release Dylan was hospitalized with life-threatening pericarditis, brought on by histoplasmosis. His scheduled European tour was canceled, but Dylan made a speedy recovery and left the hospital saying, "I really thought I'd be seeing Elvis soon". He was back on the road by mid-year, and performed before Pope John Paul II at the World Eucharistic Conference in Bologna, Italy. The Pope treated the audience of 200,000 to a homily based on "Blowin' in the Wind".

Time Out of Mind (1997), with its bitter assessments of love and morbid ruminations, was highly acclaimed. "Cold Irons Bound" won Dylan another Grammy For Best Male Rock Vocal Performance, and the album won him Grammy Award for Album of the Year. Its first single, "Not Dark Yet", has been called one of Dylan's best songs and "Make You Feel My Love" was covered by Billy Joel, Garth Brooks, Adele and others. Elvis Costello said "I think it might be the best record he's made."

=== 2000–2009: Oscar win, memoir, and Modern Times ===
"Things Have Changed"
Dylan's Oscar-winning song was featured in the movie Wonder Boys. The line "sapphire-tinted skies" echoes the verse of Shelley while "forty miles of bad road" echoes Duane Eddy's hit single.

In 2001, Dylan won an Academy Award for Best Original Song for "Things Have Changed", written for the film Wonder Boys. "Love and Theft" was released on September 11, 2001. Recorded with his touring band, Dylan produced the album under the alias Jack Frost. Critics noted that Dylan was widening his musical palette to include rockabilly, Western swing, jazz and lounge music. It won the Grammy Award for Best Contemporary Folk Album. The Wall Street Journal pointed out similarities between the album's lyrics and Junichi Saga's Confessions of a Yakuza. Saga was not familiar with Dylan's work, but said he was flattered. Upon hearing the album, Saga said of Dylan: "His lines flow from one image to the next and don't always make sense. But they have a great atmosphere."

In 2003, Dylan revisited the evangelical songs from his Christian period and participated in the project Gotta Serve Somebody: The Gospel Songs of Bob Dylan. That year, Dylan released Masked & Anonymous, which he co-wrote with director Larry Charles under the alias Sergei Petrov. Dylan starred as Jack Fate, alongside a cast that included Jeff Bridges, Penélope Cruz and John Goodman. The film polarized critics; A. O. Scott called it an "incoherent mess"; a few treated it as a serious work of art.

In 2004, Dylan published the first part of his memoir, Chronicles: Volume One. Confounding expectations, Dylan devoted three chapters to his first year in New York City in 1961–1962, virtually ignoring the mid-1960s when his fame was at its height, while devoting chapters to New Morning (1970) and Oh Mercy (1989). The book reached number two on The New York Times' Hardcover Non-Fiction bestseller list in December 2004 and was nominated for a National Book Award.

Critics noted that Chronicles contained many examples of pastiche and borrowing; sources included Time and the novels of Jack London. Clinton Heylin queried the veracity of Chronicles, noting "Not a single checkable story held water; not one anecdote couldn't be shot full of holes by any half-decent researcher."

Martin Scorsese's Dylan documentary No Direction Home was broadcast on September 26–27, 2005, on BBC Two in the UK and on American Masters on PBS in the US. It covers the period from Dylan's arrival in New York in 1961 to his motorcycle crash in 1966, featuring interviews with Joan Baez, Allen Ginsberg, Pete Seeger, Suze Rotolo, Liam Clancy, Mavis Staples and Dylan himself. The film earned a Peabody Award and a Columbia-duPont Award. The accompanying soundtrack featured unreleased songs from Dylan's early years.

Dylan made his broadcasting debut in 2006 with Theme Time Radio Hour on XM Satellite Radio. He played songs with a common theme, such as "Weather", "Weddings", "Dance" and "Dreams". Dylan's records ranged from Muddy Waters to Prince, L.L. Cool J to the Streets. The show was praised for the breadth of musical selections and for his jokes, stories and eclectic references. In April 2009, Dylan broadcast the 100th show in his the series; the theme was "Goodbye" and he signed off with Woody Guthrie's "So Long, It's Been Good to Know Yuh".

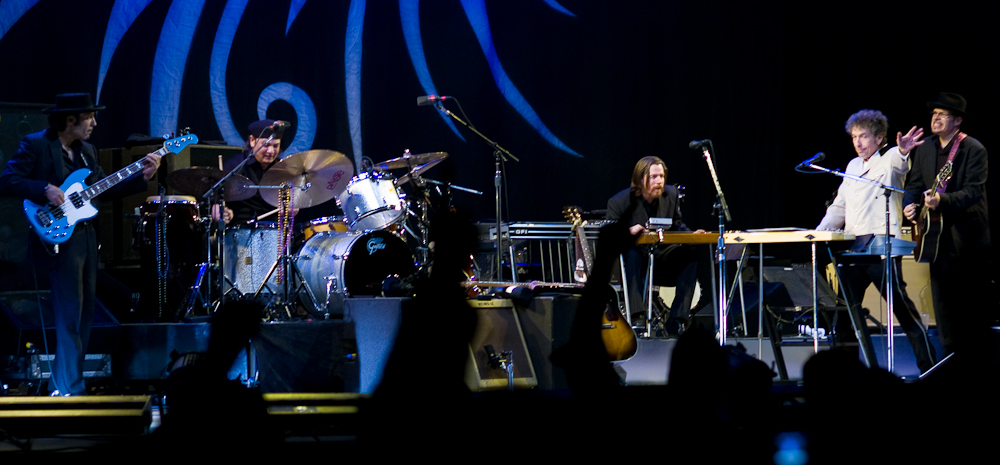
Dylan at the Spectrum, 2007

Modern Times (2006) was relesad to acclaim. Despite some coarsening of Dylan's voice (a critic for The Guardian characterized his singing on the album as "a catarrhal death rattle") many described it as the final installment of a successful trilogy, encompassing Time Out of Mind and "Love and Theft". Modern Times entered the US charts at number one, making it Dylan's first album to reach that position since Desire. The New York Times published an article exploring similarities between some of Dylan's lyrics in Modern Times and the work of the Civil War poet Henry Timrod. Modern Times won the Grammy Award for Best Contemporary Folk Album and Dylan won Best Solo Rock Vocal Performance for "Someday Baby". Modern Times was named Album of the Year by Rolling Stone and Uncut. On the same day that Modern Times was released, the iTunes Music Store released Bob Dylan: The Collection, a digital box set containing all of his albums (773 tracks), along with 42 rare and unreleased tracks.

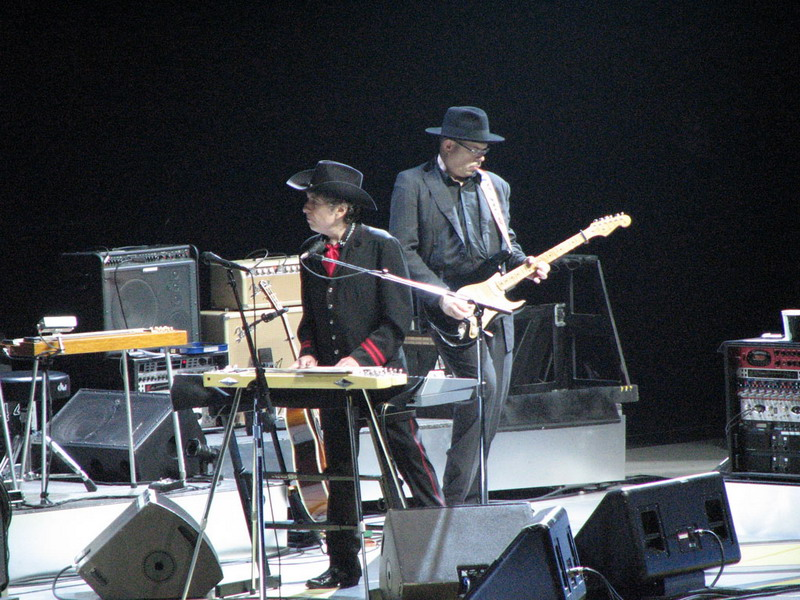
Dylan performs at Air Canada Centre, Toronto, November 7, 2006

Columbia Records released the triple CD retrospective Dylan, anthologizing his entire career under the Dylan 07 logo. The sophistication of the Dylan 07 marketing campaign was a reminder that Dylan's commercial profile had risen considerably since the 1990s. This became evident in 2004, when Dylan appeared in an advertisement for Victoria's Secret. In October 2007, he participated in a multi-media campaign for the 2008 Cadillac Escalade. In 2009 he gave the highest profile endorsement of his career to date, appearing with rapper will.i.am in a Pepsi ad that debuted during Super Bowl XLIII. The ad opened with Dylan singing the first verse of "Forever Young" followed by will.i.am doing a hip hop version of the song's final verse.

The Bootleg Series Vol. 8 – Tell Tale Signs was released in October 2008, as both a two-CD set and a three-CD version with a 150-page hardcover book. The set contains live performances and outtakes from selected studio albums from Oh Mercy to Modern Times, as well as soundtrack contributions and collaborations with David Bromberg and Ralph Stanley. The pricing of the album—the two-CD set went on sale for $18.99 and the three-CD version for $129.99—led to complaints about "rip-off packaging". The release was widely acclaimed by critics. The abundance of alternative takes and unreleased material suggested to one reviewer that this volume of old outtakes "feels like a new Bob Dylan record, not only for the astonishing freshness of the material, but also for the incredible sound quality and organic feeling of everything here".

Together Through Life (2009) originated when French director Olivier Dahan asked Dylan to supply a song for his film My Own Love Song. He initially intended to record a single track, "Life Is Hard", but "the record sort of took its own direction". Nine of the album's ten songs are credited as co-written by Dylan and Robert Hunter. The album received favorable reviews, although several critics described it as a minor addition to Dylan's canon. In its first week of release, the album reached number one on the Billboard 200 chart in the US, making Dylan, at 67 years of age, the oldest artist to ever debut at number one on that chart.

Dylan's Christmas in the Heart (2009) compried such Christmas standards as "Little Drummer Boy", "Winter Wonderland" and "Here Comes Santa Claus". Edna Gundersen wrote that Dylan was "revisiting yuletide styles popularized by Nat King Cole, Mel Tormé, and the Ray Conniff Singers". Dylan's royalties from the album were donated to the charities Feeding America in the US, Crisis in the UK, and the World Food Programme. The album received generally favorable reviews. Dylan was asked why he had performed the songs in a straightforward style. He replied: "There wasn't any other way to play it. These songs are part of my life, just like folk songs. You have to play them straight too."

=== 2010–2019: Tempest and continued recordings ===
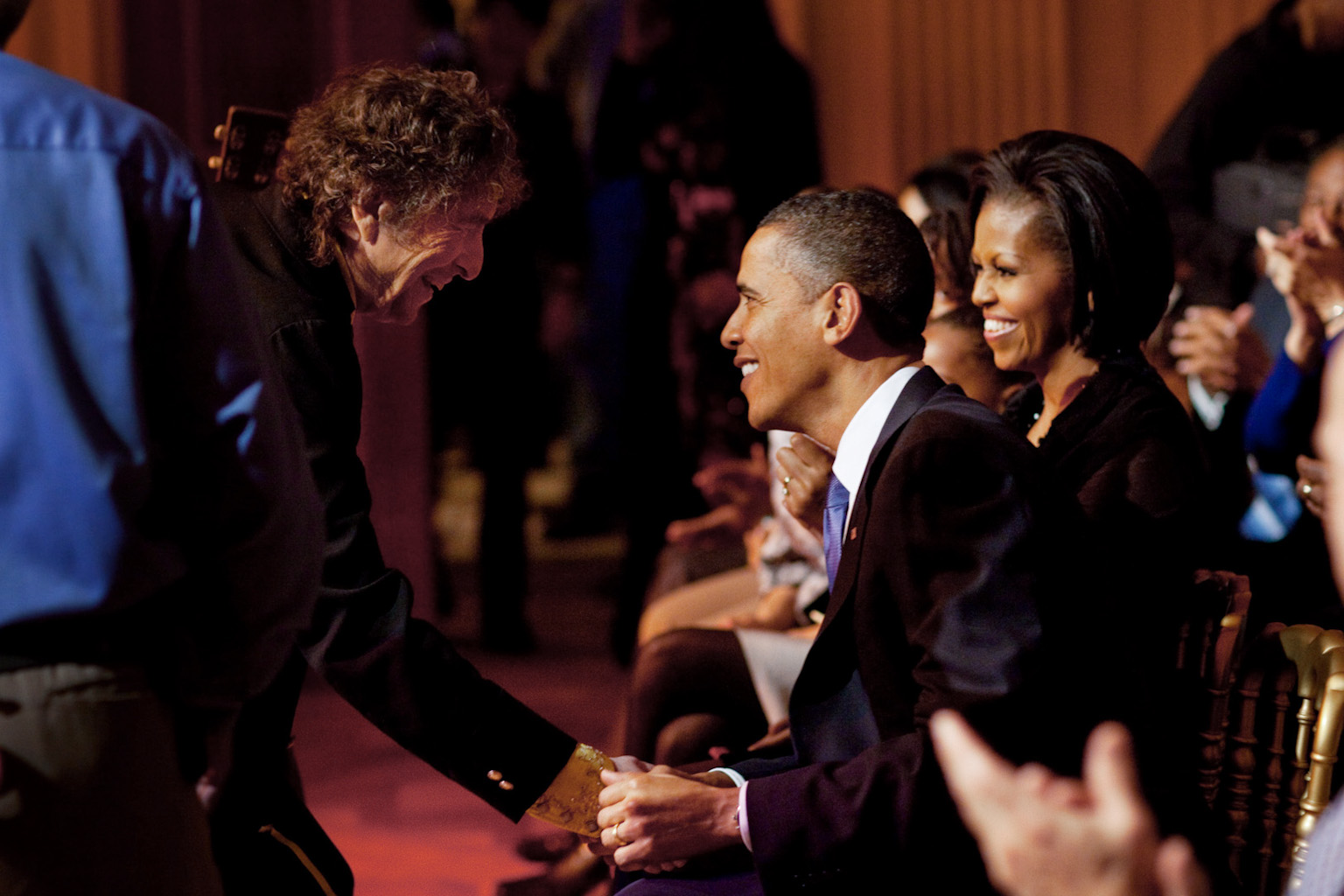
Dylan and the Obamas at the White House, after a performance celebrating music from the civil rights movement on February 9, 2010

On Dylan's 70th birthday in 2011, the universities of Mainz, Vienna, and Bristol invited literary critics and historians to give papers on Dylan's work. Other events, including tribute bands, discussions and singalongs, took place. The Guardian wrote: "From Moscow to Madrid, Norway to Northampton and Malaysia to his home state of Minnesota, self-confessed 'Bobcats' will gather today to celebrate the 70th birthday of a giant of popular music."

Tempest, was released on September 11, 2012. The album features a tribute to Lennon, "Roll On John", and the title track is a 14-minute song about the sinking of the Titanic. Will Hermes wrote: "Lyrically, Dylan is at the top of his game, joking around, dropping wordplay and allegories that evade pat readings and quoting other folks' words like a freestyle rapper on fire".

The Bootleg Series Vol. 10: Another Self Portrait (1969–1971), was released in August 2013. The album contained 35 previously unreleased tracks, including alternative takes and demos from Dylan's 1969–71 recording sessions during the making of Self Portrait and New Morning. The box set included a live recording of Dylan's performance with the Band at the Isle of Wight Festival in 1969. Thom Jurek wrote, "For fans, this is more than a curiosity, it's an indispensable addition to the catalog." Columbia Records released a boxset containing all 35 studio albums, six albums of live recordings and a collection of non-album material (Sidetracks) as Bob Dylan: Complete Album Collection: Vol. One, in November. To publicize the box set, a video of "Like a Rolling Stone" was released on Dylan's website. The interactive video allowed viewers to switch between 16 simulated TV channels, all featuring characters lip-synching the lyrics.

Dylan appeared in an ad for the Chrysler 200 which aired during the 2014 Super Bowl. In it, he says that "Detroit made cars and cars made America... So let Germany brew your beer, let Switzerland make your watch, let Asia assemble your phone. We will build your car." Dylan's ad was criticized for its protectionist implications, and people wondered whether he had "sold out". The Lyrics: Since 1962 was published by Simon & Schuster in the fall of 2014. The book was edited by Christopher Ricks, Julie Nemrow and Lisa Nemrow and offered variant versions of Dylan's songs, sourced from out-takes and live performances. A limited edition of 50 books, signed by Dylan, was priced at $5,000. "It's the biggest, most expensive book we've ever published, as far as I know", said Jonathan Karp, Simon & Schuster's president and publisher. A comprehensive edition of the Basement Tapes was released as The Bootleg Series Vol. 11: The Basement Tapes Complete in November 2014. The album included 138 tracks which Dylan and the Band had recorded at their homes in Woodstock, New York in 1967. The Basement Tapes Complete won the Grammy Award for Best Historical Album.

Shadows in the Night (2015), featuring ten songs written between 1923 and 1963, which have been described as part of the Great American Songbook. All the songs had been recorded by Frank Sinatra, but critics and Dylan himself cautioned against seeing the record as a collection of "Sinatra covers". Dylan explained: "I don't see myself as covering these songs in any way. They've been covered enough. Buried, as a matter a fact. What me and my band are basically doing is uncovering them. Lifting them out of the grave and bringing them into the light of day". Critics praised the restrained instrumental backings and quality of Dylan's singing. The album debuted at number one in the UK Albums Chart. The Bootleg Series Vol. 12: The Cutting Edge 1965–1966, consisting of previously unreleased material from Bringing It All Back Home, Highway 61 Revisited and Blonde on Blonde, was released in November 2015. On Dylan's website the "Collector's Edition" was described as containing "every single note recorded by Bob Dylan in the studio in 1965/1966".

Fallen Angels (2016) was described as "a direct continuation of the work of 'uncovering' the Great Songbook that he began on Shadows In the Night". The album contained twelve songs by classic songwriters such as Harold Arlen, Sammy Cahn and Johnny Mercer, eleven of which had been recorded by Sinatra. Jim Farber wrote: "Tellingly, [Dylan] delivers these songs of love lost and cherished not with a burning passion but with the wistfulness of experience. They're memory songs now, intoned with a present sense of commitment. Released just four days ahead of his 75th birthday, they couldn't be more age-appropriate". The 1966 Live Recordings, including every known recording of Dylan's 1966 concert tour, was released in November. The recordings commence with the concert in White Plains New York on February 5, 1966, and end with the Royal Albert Hall concert in London on May 27. The New York Times reported most of the concerts had "never been heard in any form", and described the set as "a monumental addition to the corpus".

Triplicate (2017) is a triple album of 30 recordings of classic American songs. It was recorded in Capitol Studios and features his touring band. Critics praised the thoroughness of Dylan's exploration of the Great American Songbook, though, in the opinion of Uncut, "For all its easy charms, Triplicate labours its point to the brink of overkill. After five albums' worth of croon toons, this feels like a fat full stop on a fascinating chapter."

The next volume of Dylan's Bootleg Series revisited his "Born Again" Christian period of 1979 to 1981, described by Rolling Stone as "an intense, wildly controversial time that produced three albums and some of the most confrontational concerts of his long career". Reviewing the box set The Bootleg Series Vol. 13: Trouble No More 1979–1981, Jon Pareles wrote:

Decades later, what comes through these recordings above all is Mr. Dylan's unmistakable fervor, his sense of mission. The studio albums are subdued, even tentative, compared with what the songs became on the road. Mr. Dylan's voice is clear, cutting and ever improvisational; working the crowds, he was emphatic, committed, sometimes teasingly combative. And the band tears into the music.

Netflix released Rolling Thunder Revue: A Bob Dylan Story by Martin Scorsese (2019), billed as "Part documentary, part concert film, part fever dream". The film earned positive reviews but caused controversy as it mixed documentary footage filmed during the Rolling Thunder Revue in the fall of 1975 with fictitious characters and stories. Coinciding with the film, the box set The Rolling Thunder Revue: The 1975 Live Recordings, was released by Columbia Records. The set comprises five full Dylan performances from the tour and discovered tapes from Dylan's tour rehearsals.

=== 2020–present: Rough and Rowdy Ways ===
On March 26, 2020, coinciding with the Covid-19 pandemic, Dylan released "Murder Most Foul", a seventeen-minute song revolving around the Kennedy assassination, on his YouTube channel. Billboard reported on April 8 that "Murder Most Foul" had topped the Rock Digital Song Sales Chart, the first time that Dylan had scored a number one song on a pop chart under his own name. Three weeks later, Dylan released another, "I Contain Multitudes". The title is from Walt Whitman's "Song of Myself". On May 7, Dylan released a third single, "False Prophet", accompanied by the news that the three songs would all appear on a forthcoming double album.

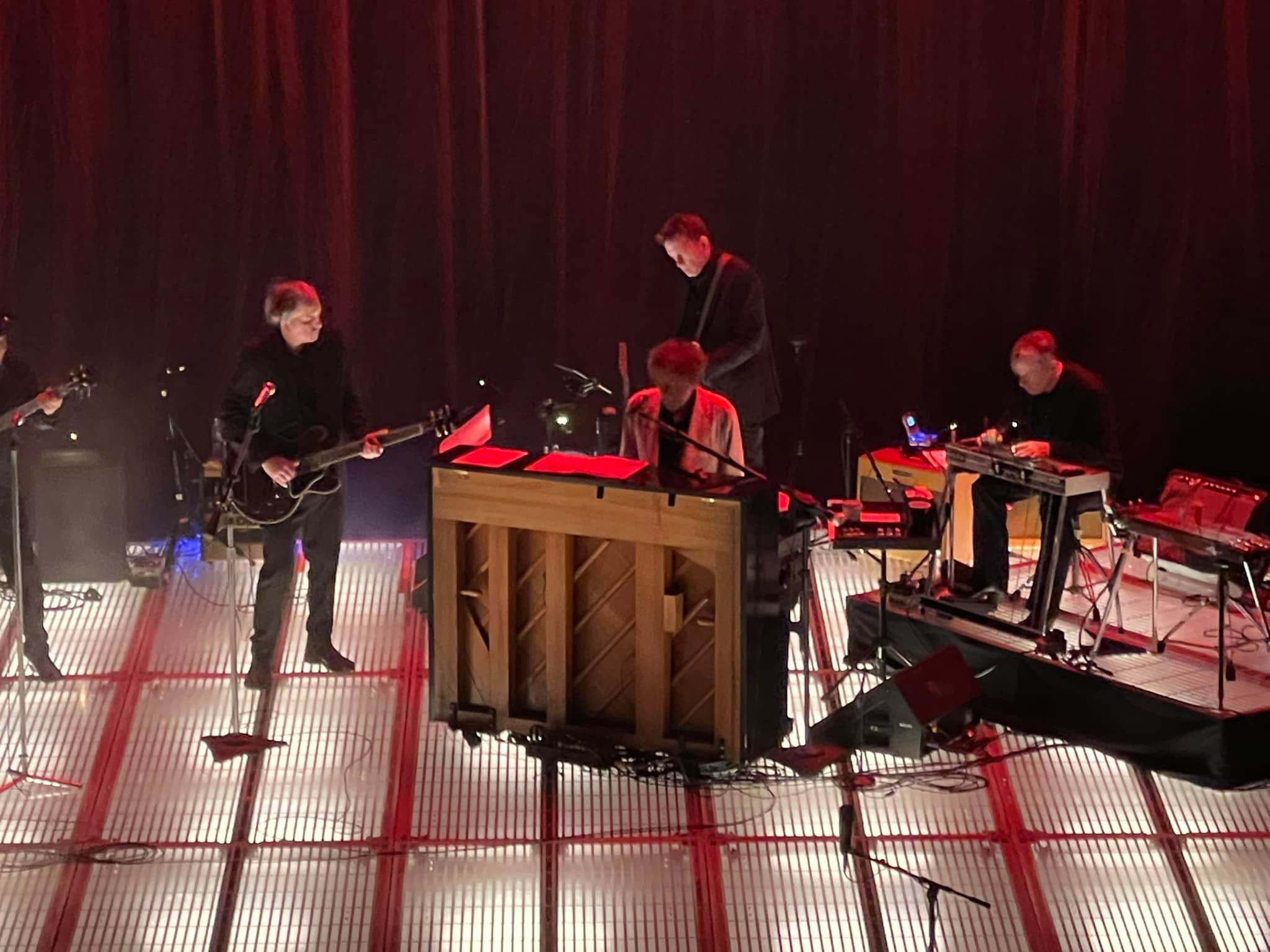
Dylan performs at Riverside Theatre, Milwaukee, November 2, 2021

Rough and Rowdy Ways, Dylan's first album of original material since 2012, was released on June 19 to favorable reviews. Alexis Petridis wrote: "the die-hards can spend months unravelling the knottier lyrics, but you don't need a PhD in Dylanology to appreciate its singular quality and power." Rob Sheffield wrote: "While the world keeps trying to celebrate him as an institution, pin him down, cast him in the Nobel Prize canon, embalm his past, this drifter always keeps on making his next escape. On Rough and Rowdy Ways, Dylan is exploring terrain nobody else has reached before—yet he just keeps pushing on into the future". In its first week of release, Rough and Rowdy Ways reached number one on the UK album chart, making Dylan "the oldest artist to score a No. 1 of new, original material".

In December 2020, Dylan sold his catalog to Universal Music Publishing Group, including both the income he receives as a songwriter and his control of their copyright. Universal, a division of the French media conglomerate Vivendi, will collect all future income from the songs. The New York Times estimated the price at more than $300 million", although other reports suggested the figure was closer to $400 million.

Dylan's 80th birthday was commemorated by a virtual conference, Dylan@80, organized by the University of Tulsa Institute for Bob Dylan Studies. Several new biographies and studies of Dylan were published.

Dylan suspended his Never Ending Tour due to the COVID-19 pandemic; in July 2021, livestream platform Veeps presented a 50-minute performance by Dylan, Shadow Kingdom: The Early Songs of Bob Dylan. Filmed in black and white with a film noir look, Dylan performed 13 songs in a club setting with an audience. The performance was favorably reviewed, and one critic suggested the backing band resembled the style of the musical Girl from the North Country. The soundtrack was released in June 2023. In September, Dylan released Springtime in New York: The Bootleg Series Vol. 16 (1980–1985), issued in 2 LP, 2 CD and 5 CD formats. It comprises rehearsals, live recordings, out-takes and alternative takes from Shot of Love, Infidels and Empire Burlesque. Neil McCormick wrote: "These bootleg sessions remind us that Dylan's worst period is still more interesting than most artists' purple patches".

On July 7, 2022, Christie's, London, auctioned a 2021 recording of Dylan singing "Blowin' in the Wind". The record was in an innovative "one of one" recording medium, branded as Ionic Original, which producer T Bone Burnett claimed "surpasses the sonic excellence and depth for which analogue sound is renowned, while at the same time boasting the durability of a digital recording." The recording fetched GBP £1,482,000—equivalent to $1,769,508. In November, Dylan published The Philosophy of Modern Song, a collection of 66 essays on songs by other artists. The New Yorker described it as "a rich, riffy, funny, and completely engaging book of essays". Other reviewers praised the book's eclectic outlook, while some questioned its variations in style and dearth of female songwriters.

In January 2023, Dylan released The Bootleg Series Vol. 17: Fragments – Time Out of Mind Sessions (1996–1997) in multiple formats. The 5-CD version included a re-mix of the 1997 album "to sound more like how the songs came across when the musicians originally played them in the room" without the effects and processing which producer Daniel Lanois applied later; 25 previously unreleased out-takes from the studio sessions; and a disc of live performances of each song on the album performed by Dylan and his band in concert. On November 17, 2023, Dylan released The Complete Budokan 1978, containing the full recordings of the February 28 and March 1 Tokyo concerts from his 1978 Tour.

Dylan released The Bootleg Series Vol. 18: Through the Open Window 1956–1963, an 8-CD collection of recordings chronicling his development from a 15 year-old high school student to his major concert at Carnegie Hall in October 1963. It was also released in a 2-CD highlights format. The set includes a 125 page booklet by historian Sean Wilentz and was critically acclaimed.

On November 6, 2026, Dylan released The Rolling Thunder Revue: The 1976 Live Recordings, a box set containing 39 discs and 381 tracks (371 of which are previously unreleased), that chronicle the 1976 leg of the Rolling Thunder Revue.

== Never Ending Tour ==
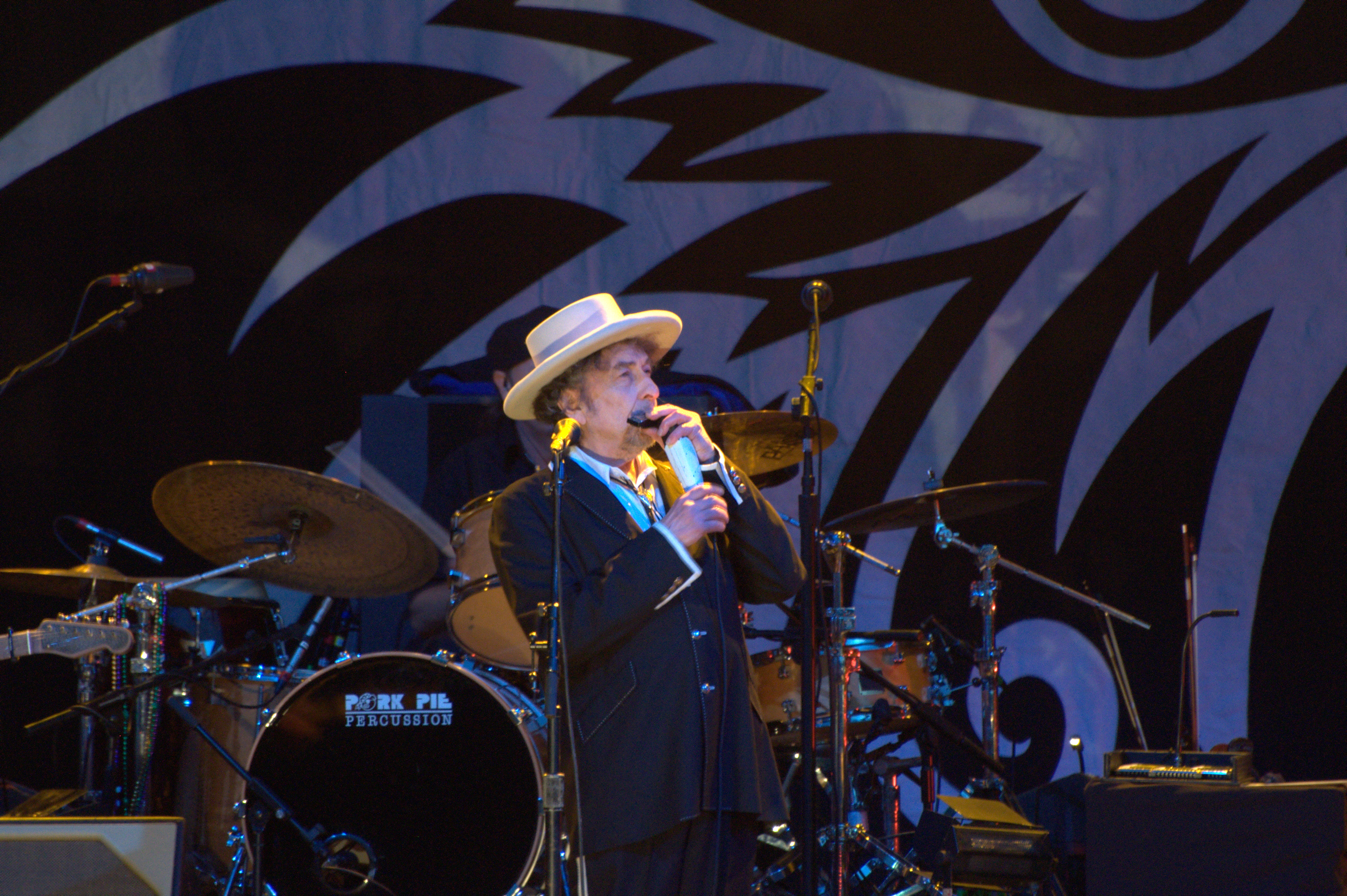
Dylan performing at Finsbury Park, London, June 18, 2011

The Never Ending Tour commenced on June 7, 1988. Dylan has played roughly 100 dates a year since, a heavier schedule than most performers who started in the 1960s. By April 2019, Dylan and his band had played more than 3,000 shows, anchored by long-time bassist Tony Garnier.

To the chagrin of some, Dylan's performances are unpredictable as he often alters his arrangements and changes his vocal approach. These variable performances have divided critics. Richard Williams and Andy Gill argued that Dylan has found a successful way to present his rich legacy of material. Others have criticized his live performances for changing "the greatest lyrics ever written so that they are effectively unrecognisable", and giving so little to the audience that "it is difficult to understand what he is doing on stage at all".

In April, Dylan announced a Summer 2026 tour beginning in Troutdale, Oregon on June 4, and ending in Nashville, Tennessee on August 1. In July, Dylan announced a European tour, starting in Oslo on October 17, 2026, and finishing in London on December 8.

Alex Ross summarised Dylan's touring career: "his shows cause his songs to mutate, so that no definitive or ideal version exists. Dylan's legacy will be the sum of thousands of performances, over many decades ... Every night, whether he's in good or bad form, he says, in effect, 'Think again.'"

== Personal life ==
Dylan's primary residence is reportedly in Point Dume, on the coast of Malibu, California. He formerly owned an estate in the Scottish Highlands and a townhouse in Harlem, New York City.

=== Romantic relationships ===
==== Echo Helstrom ====
Echo Helstrom was Dylan's high school girlfriend. The couple listened together to rhythm-and-blues on the radio, and her family exposed him to singers such as Jimmie Rodgers on 78 RPM records, and a range of folk music magazines, sheet music, and manuscripts. Helstrom is believed by some to be the inspiration for Dylan's song "Girl from the North Country", though this is disputed.

==== Suze Rotolo ====
Dylan's first serious relationship was with artist Suze Rotolo, a daughter of Communist Party USA radicals. According to Dylan, "She was the most erotic thing I'd ever seen ... The air was suddenly filled with banana leaves. We started talking and my head started to spin". Rotolo was photographed arm-in-arm with Dylan on the cover of his album The Freewheelin' Bob Dylan. Critics have connected Rotolo to some of Dylan's early love songs, including "Don't Think Twice It's All Right". The relationship ended in 1964. In 2008, Rotolo published a memoir about her life in Greenwich Village and relationship with Dylan in the 1960s, A Freewheelin' Time.

==== Joan Baez ====
When Joan Baez met Dylan in April 1961, she had already released her first album and was acclaimed as the "Queen of Folk". On hearing Dylan perform "With God on Our Side", Baez later said, "I never thought anything so powerful could come out of that little toad". In July 1963, Baez invited Dylan to join her on stage at the Newport Folk Festival, setting the scene for similar duets over the next two years. By the time of Dylan's 1965 tour of the UK, their romantic relationship had begun to fizzle out, as captured in D. A. Pennebaker's documentary Dont Look Back. Baez later toured with Dylan as a performer on his Rolling Thunder Revue in 1975–76. Baez also starred as "The Woman In White" in the film Renaldo and Clara (1978), directed by Dylan. Dylan and Baez toured together again in 1984 with Carlos Santana.

Baez recalled her relationship with Dylan in Martin Scorsese's No Direction Home (2005). She wrote about Dylan in two autobiographies—admiringly in Daybreak (1968), less so in And A Voice to Sing With (1987). Her song "Diamonds & Rust" has been described as "an acute portrait" of Dylan.

==== Sara Lownds ====
Dylan married Sara Lownds, who had worked as a model and secretary at Drew Associates, on November 22, 1965. They had four children: Jesse Byron (born January 6, 1966), Anna Lea (born July 11, 1967), Samuel Isaac Abram (born July 30, 1968), and Jakob Luke (born December 9, 1969). Dylan also adopted Sara's daughter from a prior marriage, Maria Lownds (later Dylan, born October 21, 1961). Sara Dylan played the role of Clara in Dylan's film Renaldo and Clara (1978). Bob and Sara Dylan were divorced on June 29, 1977.

==== Carolyn Dennis ====
Dylan and his backing singer Carolyn Dennis (often professionally known as Carol Dennis) have a daughter, Desiree Gabrielle Dennis-Dylan, born on January 31, 1986. They were married on June 4, 1986, and divorced in October 1992. Their marriage and child remained a closely guarded secret until the publication of Howard Sounes's biography Down the Highway: The Life of Bob Dylan, in 2001.

=== Religious beliefs ===
Growing up in Hibbing, Minnesota, Dylan and his family were part of the area's small, close-knit Jewish community, and Dylan had his bar mitzvah in May 1954. Around the time of his 30th birthday, in 1971, Dylan visited Israel, and also met Rabbi Meir Kahane, founder of the New York-based Jewish Defense League.

In the late 1970s, Dylan converted to Christianity. In November 1978, guided by his friend Mary Alice Artes, Dylan made contact with the Vineyard Christian Fellowship. He claimed to have experienced a new birth and to have become an evangelical Christian. From January to March 1979, Dylan attended Vineyard's Bible study classes in Reseda, California.

By 1984, Dylan was distancing himself from the "born again" label. He told Kurt Loder of Rolling Stone: "I've never said I'm 'born again'. That's just a media term. I don't think I've been an agnostic. I've always thought there's a superior power, that this is not the real world and that there's a world to come." In 1997, he told David Gates of Newsweek:

Here's the thing with me and the religious thing. This is the flat-out truth: I find the religiosity and philosophy in the music. I don't find it anywhere else. Songs like "Let Me Rest on a Peaceful Mountain" or "I Saw the Light"—that's my religion. I don't adhere to rabbis, preachers, evangelists, all of that. I've learned more from the songs than I've learned from any of this kind of entity. The songs are my lexicon. I believe the songs.

Dylan has supported the Chabad Lubavitch movement, and has privately participated in Jewish religious events, including his sons' bar mitzvahs and services at Hadar Hatorah, a Chabad Lubavitch yeshiva. In 1989 and 1991, he appeared on the Chabad telethon.

Dylan has continued to perform songs from his gospel albums in concert, occasionally covering traditional religious songs. He has made passing references to his religious faith, such as in a 2004 interview with 60 Minutes, when he told Ed Bradley, "the only person you have to think twice about lying to is either yourself or to God". He explained his constant touring schedule as part of a bargain he made a long time ago with the "chief commander—in this earth and in the world we can't see".

Speaking to Jeff Slate of The Wall Street Journal in December 2022, Dylan reaffirmed his religious outlook: "I read the scriptures a lot, meditate and pray, light candles in church. I believe in damnation and salvation as well as predestination. The Five Books of Moses, Pauline Epistles, Invocation of the Saints, all of it."

== Accolades and honors ==
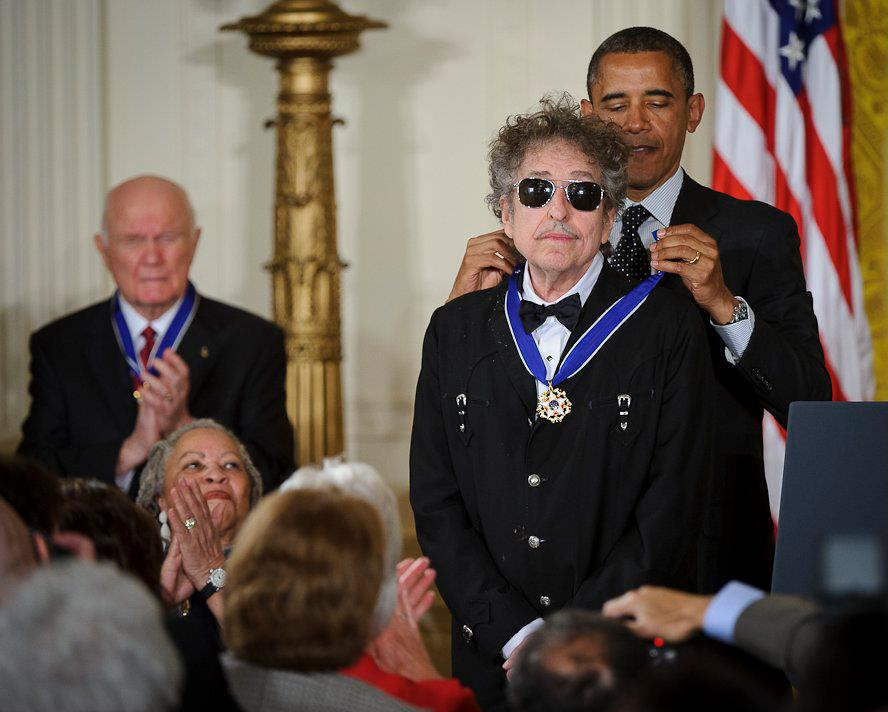
President Obama presents Dylan with a Medal of Freedom, May 2012.

Dylan was inducted into the Rock and Roll Hall of Fame in 1988, his first year of eligibility. He has also been inducted into the Nashville Songwriters Hall of Fame and Songwriters Hall of Fame. In 1997, US President Bill Clinton presented Dylan with a Kennedy Center Honor in the East Room of the White House, saying: "He probably had more impact on people of my generation than any other creative artist. His voice and lyrics haven't always been easy on the ear, but throughout his career Bob Dylan has never aimed to please. He's disturbed the peace and discomforted the powerful". In 2008, the Pulitzer Prize jury awarded him a special citation for "his profound impact on popular music and American culture, marked by lyrical compositions of extraordinary poetic power".

Dylan received the Presidential Medal of Freedom in May 2012. Barack Obama, presenting Dylan with the award, said "There is not a bigger giant in the history of American music." Obama praised Dylan's voice for its "unique gravelly power that redefined not just what music sounded like but the message it carried and how it made people feel". In November 2013, Dylan was awarded France's highest honor, the Légion d'Honneur, despite the misgiving of the grand chancellor of the Légion, who had declared him unworthy. In February 2015, Dylan accepted the MusiCares Person of the Year award from the National Academy of Recording Arts and Sciences, in recognition of his philanthropic and artistic contributions.

=== Nobel Prize in Literature ===
Sara Danius announces the Nobel Prize in Literature 2016

In 1996, Gordon Ball of the Virginia Military Institute nominated Dylan for the Nobel Prize in Literature, initiating a campaign that lasted for 20 years. On October 13, 2016, the Nobel committee announced that it would award Dylan the prize "for having created new poetic expressions within the great American song tradition". Horace Engdahl, a member of the Nobel Committee, described Dylan as "a singer worthy of a place beside the Greek bards, beside Ovid, beside the Romantic visionaries, beside the kings and queens of the blues, beside the forgotten masters of brilliant standards". The New York Times reported: "Mr. Dylan, 75, is the first musician to win the award, and his selection was perhaps the most radical choice in a history stretching back to 1901." Dylan remained silent for days after receiving the award, and then told Edna Gundersen that it was "amazing, incredible. Whoever dreams about something like that?" Dylan's Nobel lecture was delivered on June 4, 2017.

== Legacy ==
Dylan has been called one of the most influential cultural figures of the 20th century. He was included in the Time 100: The Most Important People of the Century, where he was called "master poet, caustic social critic and intrepid, guiding spirit of the counterculture generation". Paul Simon said: "[Dylan's] early songs were very rich ... with strong melodies. 'Blowin' in the Wind' has a really strong melody. He so enlarged himself through the folk background that he incorporated it for a while. He defined the genre for a while."

For many critics, Dylan's greatest achievement was the synthesis exemplified by his mid-1960s trilogy, Bringing It All Back Home, Highway 61 Revisited and Blonde on Blonde. In Mike Marqusee's words:

Between late 1964 and the middle of 1966, Dylan created a body of work that remains unique. Drawing on folk, blues, country, R&B, rock'n'roll, gospel, British beat, symbolist, modernist and Beat poetry, surrealism and Dada, advertising jargon and social commentary, Fellini and Mad magazine, he forged a coherent and original artistic voice and vision. The beauty of these albums retains the power to shock and console.

In 1972, Michael Gray initiated serious critical scrutiny when he published Song & Dance Man: The Art of Bob Dylan, situating Dylan's work in the context of the English literary tradition of Donne, Browning and T. S. Eliot. That year, Craig McGregor published Bob Dylan: A Retrospective, an anthology containing critical essays about Dylan by Robert Shelton, Nat Hentoff, Ellen Willis and other contemporary cultural critics. In 1998, Stanford University sponsored the first international academic conference on Dylan held in the United States. In 2004, Richard F. Thomas, Classics professor at Harvard University, created the freshman seminar "Dylan", which aimed "to put the artist in context of not just popular culture of the last half-century, but the tradition of classical poets like Virgil and Homer." Thomas wrote Why Bob Dylan Matters (2017), exploring Dylan's connections with Greek and Latin literature. Literary critic Christopher Ricks published Dylan's Visions of Sin (2004), an appreciation of Dylan's work. After Dylan's Nobel win, Ricks reflected: "I'd not have written a book about Dylan, to stand alongside my books on Milton and Keats, Tennyson and T.S. Eliot, if I didn't think Dylan a genius of and with language."

The critical consensus on Dylan was articulated by Encyclopædia Britannica: "Hailed as the Shakespeare of his generation, Dylan ... set the standard for lyric writing." Former British poet laureate Andrew Motion said Dylan's lyrics should be studied in schools. Edna Gundersen noted that lines like "When you got nothing, you got nothing to lose"; "a hard rain's a-gonna fall"; "to live outside the law you must be honest" had entered the vernacular, and "you don't need a weather man to know which way the wind blows" and "the times they are a-changin'" appear in Bartlett's Familiar Quotations. The Rolling Stone Encyclopedia of Rock & Roll writes that "his lyrics—the first in rock to be seriously regarded as literature—became so well known that politicians from Jimmy Carter to Václav Havel have cited them as an influence".

Artists acknowledging Dylan's influence include John Lennon, Paul McCartney, Ray Davies, Pete Townshend, Syd Barrett, Tim Buckley, Joni Mitchell, Neil Young, David Bowie, Bruce Springsteen, Patti Smith, Joe Strummer, Elvis Costello, Nick Cave, Bono, Leonard Cohen, Tom Waits, Chuck D and Steve Earle. Dylan significantly contributed to the initial success of both the Byrds and the Band: the Byrds achieved chart success with their version of "Mr. Tambourine Man" and their 1965 album Mr. Tambourine Man, while the Band were Dylan's backing band on his 1966 tour, recorded The Basement Tapes with him in 1967 and featured three previously unreleased Dylan songs on Music From Big Pink. Johnny Cash, introducing "Wanted Man", said "I don't have to tell you who Bob Dylan is—the greatest writer of our time."

Some critics have dissented from the view of Dylan as a visionary figure in popular music. In Awopbopaloobop Alopbamboom, Nik Cohn objected: "I can't take the vision of Dylan as seer, as teenage messiah, as everything else he's been worshipped as. The way I see him, he's a minor talent with a major gift for self-hype". Jack Marx credited Dylan with changing the persona of the rock star: "What cannot be disputed is that Dylan invented the arrogant, faux-cerebral posturing that has been the dominant style in rock since, with everyone from Mick Jagger to Eminem educating themselves from the Dylan handbook".

Fellow musicians have also expressed critical views. Joni Mitchell described Dylan as a "plagiarist" and his voice as "fake" in a 2010 interview in the Los Angeles Times. Mitchell's comments led to discussions on Dylan's use of other people's material, both supporting and criticizing him. Talking to Mikal Gilmore in Rolling Stone in 2012, Dylan responded to the allegation of plagiarism, including his use of Henry Timrod's verse in his album Modern Times, by saying that it was "part of the tradition". (Note: Dylan told Gilmore: "As far as Henry Timrod is concerned, have you even heard of him? Who's been reading him lately? And who's pushed him to the forefront? ... And if you think it's so easy to quote him and it can help your work, do it yourself and see how far you can get. Wussies and pussies complain about that stuff. It's an old thing—it's part of the tradition.")

Todd Haynes released I'm Not There (2007), "inspired by the music and many lives of Bob Dylan". The movie used six actors, Christian Bale, Cate Blanchett, Marcus Carl Franklin, Richard Gere, Heath Ledger and Ben Whishaw, to explore different sides of Dylan. Conor McPherson's musical Girl from the North Country uses Dylan's songs to tell stories of the Great Depression in Duluth, Minnesota. Dylan's rise, from his arrival in New York in 1961 to his controversial performance at Newport in 1965, was chronicled in the biopic A Complete Unknown (2024), starring Timothée Chalamet. Reviewing I'm Not There, J. Hoberman wrote:

Elvis might never have been born, but someone else would surely have brought the world rock 'n' roll. No such logic accounts for Bob Dylan. No iron law of history demanded that a would-be Elvis from Hibbing, Minnesota, would swerve through the Greenwich Village folk revival to become the world's first and greatest rock 'n' roll beatnik bard and then—having achieved fame and adoration beyond reckoning—vanish into a folk tradition of his own making.

"Like A Rolling Stone" topped Rolling Stones's 500 Greatest Songs in 2004 and 2011. The magazine ranked him first on its 100 Greatest Songwriters, and second on their 100 Greatest Artists. Robbie Robertson wrote:

the thing I learned from Bob is that it's OK to break those traditional rules of what songs are supposed to be: the length of a song, how imaginative you could get telling the story. It was great that someone had broken down the gates, opened up the sky to all of the possibilities. ... Bob is a great barometer for young singers and songwriters. As soon as they think they've written something good — 'I'm pushing the envelope here, I've made a breakthrough' — they should listen to one of his songs. He will always stand as the one to measure good work by. That's one of the greatest accomplishments of all.

== Archives and recognition ==
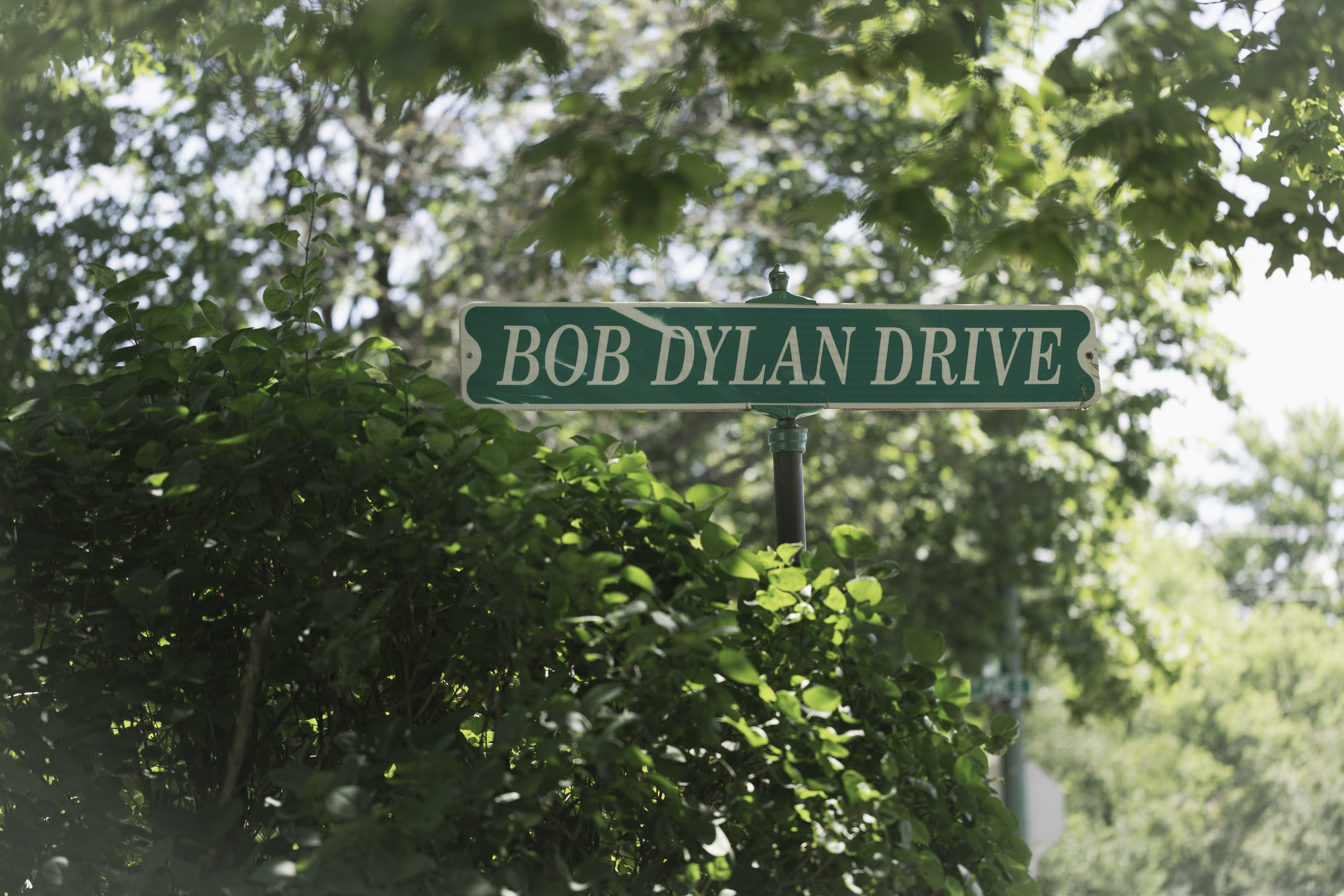
Bob Dylan Drive street sign in Hibbing, Minnesota

The sale of Dylan's archive of about 6,000 notebooks, drafts of lyrics, recordings, and correspondence to the George Kaiser Family Foundation and the University of Tulsa was announced in March 2016. The sale price was "an estimated $15 million to $20 million". To house the archive, the Bob Dylan Center in Tulsa, Oklahoma opened on May 10, 2022.

In 2005, 7th Avenue East in Hibbing, Minnesota, where Dylan lived from ages 6 to 18, received the honorary name Bob Dylan Drive. In 2006, the 1.8 miles (2.9 km) Bob Dylan Way cultural path was inaugurated in Duluth, Minnesota; it links "cultural and historically significant areas of downtown for the tourists".

In 2015, a 160-foot-wide Dylan mural by Brazilian street artist Eduardo Kobra was unveiled in downtown Minneapolis.

In December 2013, the Fender Stratocaster which Dylan had played at the 1965 Newport Folk Festival fetched $965,000, the second highest price paid for a guitar. In June 2014, Dylan's hand-written lyrics of "Like a Rolling Stone" fetched $2 million at auction, a record for a popular music manuscript.

== Visual arts ==
Dylan's career has included forays into the visual arts, dating back to the 1960s. Dylan has created both painted and sculptural art.

== Written works ==
Dylan has published Tarantula (1971), a work of prose poetry; Chronicles: Volume One (2004), the first part of his memoirs; several books of the lyrics of his songs, and ten books of his art. Dylan's third full-length book, The Philosophy of Modern Song (2022), contains 66 essays on songs by other artists. Dylan has also been the subject of numerous biographies and critical studies.

== Discography ==
- Bob Dylan (1962)
- The Freewheelin' Bob Dylan (1963)
- The Times They Are a-Changin' (1964)
- Another Side of Bob Dylan (1964)
- Bringing It All Back Home (1965)
- Highway 61 Revisited (1965)
- Blonde on Blonde (1966)
- John Wesley Harding (1967)
- Nashville Skyline (1969)
- Self Portrait (1970)
- New Morning (1970)
- Pat Garrett & Billy the Kid (1973)
- Dylan (1973)
- Planet Waves (1974)
- Blood on the Tracks (1975)
- The Basement Tapes† (1975)
- Desire (1976)
- Street-Legal (1978)
- Slow Train Coming (1979)
- Saved (1980)
- Shot of Love (1981)
- Infidels (1983)
- Empire Burlesque (1985)
- Knocked Out Loaded (1986)
- Down in the Groove (1988)
- Oh Mercy (1989)
- Under the Red Sky (1990)
- Good as I Been to You (1992)
- World Gone Wrong (1993)
- Time Out of Mind (1997)
- "Love and Theft" (2001)
- Modern Times (2006)
- Together Through Life (2009)
- Christmas in the Heart (2009)
- Tempest (2012)
- Shadows in the Night (2015)
- Fallen Angels (2016)
- Triplicate (2017)
- Rough and Rowdy Ways (2020)
- Shadow Kingdom (2023)

== Filmography ==
Dylan has appeared as an actor in five movies (Pat Garrett and Billy the Kid, Renaldo and Clara, Hearts of Fire, Masked and Anonymous, and Catchfire (cameo), as well as himself in many documentaries.
