= Bob Dylan: The Complete Album Collection Vol. One =

Forty-seven disc box set by Bob Dylan

The Complete Album Collection Vol. One

Box set by Bob Dylan
- Released: November 4, 2013
- Recorded: 1962–2012
- Genres: Rock; folk; blues; country; gospel
- Length: 34:38:43
- Label: Columbia
- Producers: John Hammond; Tom Wilson; Bob Johnston; Gordon Carroll; Rob Fraboni; Bob Dylan; The Band; Don DeVito; Barry Beckett; Jerry Wexler; Chuck Plotkin; Robert "Bumps" Blackwell; Mark Knopfler; Glyn Johns; John Cutler; Daniel Lanois; Jack Frost; Don Was; David Was; Debbie Gold; Jeff Rosen

Bob Dylan chronology
The Bootleg Series Vol. 10 (2013)	The Complete Album Collection Vol. One (2013)	The Very Best of Bob Dylan (2013)

The Complete Album Collection Vol. One is a 47-disc box set released on November 4, 2013, by Bob Dylan. It includes 35 albums released between 1962 and 2012, six live albums, and a compilation album unique to the set, Side Tracks, which contains previously released material unavailable on regular studio or live albums.

== Contents ==
This release is the first time that the 1973 album Dylan has been released on CD in North America. Fourteen of the albums have been remastered for this release. Also included was a hardcover book featuring extensive new album-by-album liner notes penned by Clinton Heylin and a new introduction written by Bill Flanagan.

The Bob Dylan Complete Album Collection Vol. One was also available as a limited-edition harmonica-shaped USB stick containing all the music, in both MP3 and FLAC lossless formats, with a digital version of the hardcover booklet, housed in a deluxe numbered box.

The 2013 remasters, 14 of which have never been remastered before, were prepared for the release of this box set.

Although Shot of Love was omitted from the list of the 14 newly remastered titles announced in the pre-release promotional material, it is in fact remastered like the other 2013 remasters. However, the 2013 remaster of Self Portrait that is used is the remaster that first appeared in the deluxe edition of The Bootleg Series Vol. 10, released in August 2013.

The new 2013 remastered albums are available only in this box set with the sole exception of the Japanese-only CD versions released by Sony Music Entertainment (Japan) in 2014. These albums are marked as including cardboard mini LP sleeves + Blu-spec CD2.

Disc #	Album	Year	Version
Disc 1	Bob Dylan	1962	2005 Remaster
Disc 2	The Freewheelin' Bob Dylan	1963	2003 Remaster
Disc 3	The Times They Are a-Changin'	1964	2005 Remaster
Disc 4	Another Side of Bob Dylan	1964	2003 Remaster
Disc 5	Bringing It All Back Home	1965	2003 Remaster
Disc 6	Highway 61 Revisited	1965	2003 Remaster
Disc 7	Blonde on Blonde	1966	2003 Remaster
Disc 8	Blonde on Blonde	1966	2003 Remaster
Disc 9	John Wesley Harding	1967	2003 Remaster
Disc 10	Nashville Skyline	1969	2003 Remaster
Disc 11	Self Portrait	1970	2013 Remaster
Disc 12	New Morning	1970	2009 Remaster
Disc 13	Pat Garrett & Billy the Kid	1973	2013 Remaster
Disc 14	Dylan	1973	2013 Remaster
Disc 15	Planet Waves	1974	2003 Remaster
Disc 16	Before the Flood	1974	2009 Remaster
Disc 17	Before the Flood	1974	2009 Remaster
Disc 18	Blood on the Tracks	1975	2003 Remaster
Disc 19	The Basement Tapes	1975	2009 Remaster
Disc 20	The Basement Tapes	1975	2009 Remaster
Disc 21	Desire	1976	2003 Remaster
Disc 22	Hard Rain	1976	2013 Remaster
Disc 23	Street-Legal (1978 original mix)	1978	2013 Remaster
Disc 24	Bob Dylan at Budokan	1979	2013 Remaster
Disc 25	Bob Dylan at Budokan	1979	2013 Remaster
Disc 26	Slow Train Coming	1979	2003 Remaster
Disc 27	Saved	1980	2013 Remaster
Disc 28	Shot of Love	1981	2013 Remaster
Disc 29	Infidels	1983	2003 Remaster
Disc 30	Real Live	1984	2013 Remaster
Disc 31	Empire Burlesque	1985	2013 Remaster
Disc 32	Knocked Out Loaded	1986	2013 Remaster
Disc 33	Down in the Groove	1988	2013 Remaster
Disc 34	Dylan & the Dead	1989	2009 Remaster
Disc 35	Oh Mercy	1989	2003 Remaster
Disc 36	Under the Red Sky	1990	2013 Remaster
Disc 37	Good as I Been to You	1992	2013 Remaster
Disc 38	World Gone Wrong	1993	2013 Remaster
Disc 39	MTV Unplugged	1995	Original CD master
Disc 40	Time Out of Mind	1997	Original CD master
Disc 41	Love and Theft	2001	2003 Remaster
Disc 42	Modern Times	2006	Original CD master
Disc 43	Together Through Life	2009	Original CD master
Disc 44	Christmas in the Heart	2009	Original CD master
Disc 45	Tempest	2012	Original CD master
Disc 46	Side Tracks	2013	2013 Remaster
Disc 47	Side Tracks	2013	2013 Remaster

== Side Tracks ==
Side Tracks

Compilation album by Bob Dylan
- Released: November 4, 2013
- Recorded: 1962–1999
- Genres: Folk; rock
- Label: Columbia
- Producers: Jeff Rosen; Steve Berkowitz

Bob Dylan chronology
The Bootleg Series Vol. 10 (2013)	Side Tracks (2013)	The 50th Anniversary Collection 1963 (2013)

This album collects all "rare" tracks previously released on Greatest Hits Vol. II and 3 and Biograph, as well as a few additional tracks previously only released as separate singles.

=== Track listing ===
All tracks are written by Bob Dylan, except "Isis" and "Romance in Durango" written by Dylan and Jacques Levy.

Disc one
No.	Title	Length
1.	"Baby, I'm in the Mood for You" (outtake, recorded July 9, 1962) (from Biograph, 1985)	2:57
2.	"Mixed-Up Confusion" (single, 1962)	2:24
3.	"Tomorrow Is a Long Time" (live, recorded April 12, 1963) (from Bob Dylan's Greatest Hits Vol. II, 1971)	3:03
4.	"Lay Down Your Weary Tune" (outtake, recorded October 24, 1963) (from Biograph)	4:37
5.	"Percy's Song" (outtake, recorded October 23, 1963) (from Biograph)	7:42
6.	"I'll Keep It with Mine" (outtake, recorded January 14, 1965) (from Biograph)	3:45
7.	"Can You Please Crawl Out Your Window?" (single, 1965)	3:34
8.	"Positively 4th Street" (single, 1965)	4:10
9.	"Jet Pilot" (outtake, recorded October 5, 1965) (from Biograph)	0:51
10.	"I Wanna Be Your Lover" (outtake, recorded October 5, 1965) (from Biograph)	3:27
11.	"I Don't Believe You (She Acts Like We Never Have Met)" (live, recorded May 6, 1966) (from Biograph)	5:20
12.	"Visions of Johanna" (live, recorded May 26, 1966) (from Biograph)	7:31
13.	"Quinn the Eskimo" (outtake, recorded July 1967) (from Biograph)	2:18
14.	"Watching the River Flow" (single, 1971)	3:35
15.	"When I Paint My Masterpiece" (from Bob Dylan's Greatest Hits Vol. II)	3:21
Total length:		58:35

Disc two
No.	Title	Length
1.	"Down in the Flood" (from Bob Dylan's Greatest Hits Vol. II)	2:49
2.	"I Shall Be Released" (from Bob Dylan's Greatest Hits Vol. II)	3:03
3.	"You Ain't Goin' Nowhere" (from Bob Dylan's Greatest Hits Vol. II)	2:45
4.	"George Jackson" (acoustic version) (B-side to "George Jackson", 1971)	3:38
5.	"George Jackson" (big band version) (single, 1971)	5:34
6.	"Forever Young" (demo, recorded June 1973) (from Biograph)	2:02
7.	"You're a Big Girl Now" (alternate version) (from Biograph)	4:22
8.	"Up to Me" (outtake, recorded September 25, 1974) (from Biograph)	6:18
9.	"Abandoned Love" (outtake, recorded July 31, 1975) (from Biograph)	4:28
10.	"Isis" (live, recorded December 4, 1975) (from Biograph)	5:19
11.	"Romance in Durango" (live, recorded December 4, 1975) (from Biograph)	4:38
12.	"Caribbean Wind" (outtake, recorded April 30, 1981) (from Biograph)	5:52
13.	"Heart of Mine" (live, recorded November 10, 1981) (from Biograph)	3:43
14.	"Series of Dreams" (from The Bootleg Series Volumes 1–3 (Rare & Unreleased) 1961–1991, 1991)	5:53
15.	"Dignity" (alternate version) (from The Best of Bob Dylan, Vol. 2, 2000)	5:35
16.	"Things Have Changed" (from Wonder Boys (Music from the Motion Picture), 2000)	5:07
Total length:		71:06

Note: The "big band" version of "George Jackson" appears only on digital versions of the album.

== Missing songs ==
Despite the "completeness" of this collection there are still several released recordings which were not included:

- "Corrina, Corrina" (B-side version)
- "House of the Rising Sun" (electric version from Highway 61 Interactive)
- "Just Like Tom Thumb's Blues" (live in Liverpool) (B-side version)
- "If You Gotta Go, Go Now" (Netherlands single version)
- "Spanish is the Loving Tongue" (B-side version)
- "Rita May"
- "Trouble in Mind"
- "Let It Be Me" (European B-side version)
- "Angel Flying Too Close to the Ground"
- "Band of the Hand"
- "Shelter from the Storm" (alternate version from the Jerry Maguire soundtrack)
- "Most Likely You Go Your Way And I'll Go Mine" (Mark Ronson Remix) (online single)
- "Things We Said Today" (from The Art of McCartney)
