= List of Bob Dylan songs based on earlier tunes =

Throughout his career, Bob Dylan has drawn inspiration from many traditional folk sources, including the songs written by Dylan listed below, which borrow from earlier works.

== Songs ==
Dylan song	Original tune	Notes and links
"Ballad in Plain D"	"My Last Farewell to Stirling"	
"Ballad of Hollis Brown"	"Pretty Polly"	
"Blind Willie McTell"	"St. James Infirmary Blues"	
"Blowin' in the Wind"	"No More Auction Block"	
"Bob Dylan's Dream"	"Lady Franklin's Lament"	
"Boots of Spanish Leather"	"Scarborough Fair"	
"Buckets of Rain"	"Bottle of Wine"	
"Chimes of Freedom"	"Chimes of Trinity"	
"Don't Think Twice, It's All Right"	"Who's Gonna Buy You Ribbons (When I'm Gone)"	
"False Prophet"	"If Lovin' is Believing"	
"Farewell"	"The Leaving of Liverpool"	
"Farewell Angelina"	"Farewell to Tarwathie"	
"Girl from the North Country"	"Scarborough Fair"	
"A Hard Rain's a-Gonna Fall"	"Lord Randall"	
"Hard Times in New York Town"	"Down On Penny's Farm"	
"I Shall Be Free"	"We Shall Be Free"	
"I've Made Up My Mind to Give Myself to You"	"Belle nuit, ô nuit d'amour" (Barcarolle)	
"John Brown"	"Mrs. McGrath"	
"Lay Down Your Weary Tune"	"The Water Is Wide" / "Oh Waly, Waly"	
"The Lonesome Death of Hattie Carroll"	"Mary Hamilton", "Child Ballad 173"	
"Masters of War"	"Nottamun Town"	
"Obviously Five Believers"	"Me and My Chauffeur Blues"	
"Percy's Song"	"The Wind and the Rain"	
"Pledging My Time"	"It Hurts Me Too"	
"Restless Farewell"	"The Parting Glass"	
"Song to Woody"	"1913 Massacre"	
"Things Have Changed"	"The Observations of a Crow"	
"The Times They Are a-Changin'"	"Farewell to Sicily"	
"Troubled and I Don't Know Why"	"What Did the Deep Sea Say?"	
"Walls of Red Wing"	"The Road and the Miles to Dundee"	
"When the Deal Goes Down"	"Where the Blue of the Night (Meets the Gold of the Day)"	
"With God on Our Side"	"The Patriot Game"	
"Oxford Town"	"Cumberland Gap"	

"Paths of Victory" (1962) is based on "Wayworn Traveler" by The Carter Family (1936)

== See also ==
- "Death Don't Have No Mercy"

== Sources ==
- Harvey, Todd (2001). The Formative Dylan: Transmission & Stylistic Influences, 1961-1963. Scarecrow Press. ISBN 0-8108-4115-0.
- Heylin, Clinton (2000). Bob Dylan: Behind the Shades Revisited. Perennial Currents. ISBN 0-06-052569-X.
- Heylin, Clinton (2009). Revolution in the Air: The Songs of Bob Dylan, 1957-1973. Cappella Books. Chicago Review Press. ISBN 978-1556528439.
- Marqusee, Mike (2005). Wicked Messenger: Bob Dylan And the 1960s. Seven Stories Press. ISBN 978-1583226865.
- Margotin, Phillipe; Guesdon, Jean-Michel (October 27, 2015). Bob Dylan: All the Songs. New York, NY: Black Dog & Leventhal Publishers. ISBN 9781579129859.
- Ricks, Christopher (2005). Dylan's Visions of Sin. Harper Perennial. ISBN 978-0060599249.
- Spitz, Bob (1991). Dylan: A Biography (British publication ed.). W. W. Norton. ISBN 978-0393307696.
- Williamson, Nigel (2004). The Rough Guide to Bob Dylan. Rough Guide Sports/Pop Culture (1st ed.). Rough Guides. ISBN 978-1843531395.
