= Live at Carnegie Hall 1963 =

Live album by Bob Dylan
- Released: November 15, 2005
- Recorded: October 26, 1963
- Venue: Carnegie Hall, New York City
- Genre: Folk
- Length: 31:53
- Label: Columbia

Bob Dylan chronology
The Bootleg Series Vol. 7: No Direction Home: The Soundtrack (2005)	Live at Carnegie Hall 1963 (2005)	The Best of Bob Dylan (2005)

Professional ratings
Review scores
Source	Rating
Allmusic	4.5/5 stars

Live at Carnegie Hall 1963 is a six-song live set by Bob Dylan. It was released as an EP by Columbia Records in 2005. The songs were recorded on October 26, 1963 at Carnegie Hall in New York City.

== Songs ==
Nineteen songs were recorded at the concert on October 26, 1963 at Carnegie Hall in New York City. Six of them are on this album. Four other songs from the concert show had been released on previous Bob Dylan compilations: "Talkin' John Birch Paranoid Blues" and "Who Killed Davey Moore?" were originally released on The Bootleg Series Volumes 1–3 (Rare & Unreleased) 1961–1991 (1991), while "A Hard Rain's a-Gonna Fall" and "When the Ship Comes In" were released on The Bootleg Series Vol. 7: No Direction Home: The Soundtrack (Aug 2005).

The remaining nine songs were issued on the European limited vinyl release The 50th Anniversary Collection 1963, released by Columbia Records in 2013 in order to prevent a number of Dylan recordings legally entering the public domain in Europe. These nine songs are: "Blowin' in the Wind", "Percy's Song", "Seven Curses", "Walls of Red Wing", "Talkin' World War III Blues", "Don't Think Twice, It's All Right", "Only a Pawn in Their Game", "Masters of War" and "The Lonesome Death of Hattie Carroll".

== Track listing ==
All tracks are written by Bob Dylan.

Live at Carnegie Hall 1963 track listing
No.	Title	Length
1.	"The Times They Are A-Changin'"	4:04
2.	"Ballad of Hollis Brown"	6:03
3.	"Boots of Spanish Leather"	5:39
4.	"Lay Down Your Weary Tune"	5:04
5.	"North Country Blues"	4:16
6.	"With God on Our Side"	6:49
