= Biograph (album) =

Box set by Bob Dylan
- Released: November 7, 1985
- Recorded: November 1961 – August 1981
- Genres: Rock; folk
- Length: 214:50
- Label: Columbia
- Producer: Jeff Rosen

Bob Dylan chronology
Empire Burlesque (1985)	Biograph (1985)	Knocked Out Loaded (1986)

Professional ratings
Review scores
Source	Rating
AllMusic	5/5 stars
The Encyclopedia of Popular Music	5/5 stars
MusicHound	4/5 stars
Rolling Stone	5/5 stars
Uncut	3/5 stars

Biograph is a compilation spanning the career of American singer-songwriter Bob Dylan, released on November 7, 1985, by Columbia Records. Consisting of 53 tracks, 18 of which were previously unreleased, from 1962 to 1981, the box set was released as a five-LP set, a three-cassette tape set, and a three-compact disc set. Biograph reached No. 33 on the Billboard 200 in the U.S. and has been certified platinum by the RIAA.

== Content ==
The recordings on Biograph are a mix of rarities, hit singles, and album tracks. They are not presented in chronological order; 18 of its 53 tracks had not been previously issued, and three more had only been previously available on singles. Every studio album released by Dylan prior to the appearance of this box set is represented by at least one track, with the exceptions of Self Portrait, Dylan, Desire, Infidels, and Empire Burlesque, although two songs from Desire appear in live versions and "Abandoned Love" is from the Desire sessions. The set comes accompanied with a 36-page booklet, containing rare photos and liner notes by Cameron Crowe, who interviews Dylan about each of the tracks.

While too comprehensive to be strictly a greatest hits album, it does include nine of the dozen Top 40 hits by Dylan during the time period covered. Missing are "Rainy Day Women#12 & 35", "George Jackson", and "Hurricane". Nine of the ten tracks from Bob Dylan's Greatest Hits appear on this compilation.

Initially released in all formats in a box conforming to the dimensions of a vinyl long-playing album, on August 19, 1997 it was reissued by Legacy Records in a smaller compact disc brick package, the tracks remastered using Sony's Super-Bit Mapping process. On August 6, 2002, it was reissued again in a booklet format with three discs; yet another new issue of this edition appeared in the marketplace on April 5, 2011. The 2011 edition was mastered at Sterling Sound Studios in New York City.

== Track listing ==
All tracks are written by Bob Dylan except "Baby Let Me Follow You Down" by Gary Davis, Dave Van Ronk, and Eric von Schmidt, and both "Isis" and "Romance in Durango" by Dylan and Jacques Levy. The compact disc running order is the same, except disc two ends with "Jet Pilot" inserted after "Isis". Disc one ends with "I Don't Believe You (She Acts Like We Never Have Met)", and disc two begins with "Visions of Johanna". Disc three begins with "Caribbean Wind".

Side one
No.	Title	Source	Length
1.	"Lay Lady Lay"	Nashville Skyline, 1969	3:18
2.	"Baby, Let Me Follow You Down"	Bob Dylan, 1962	2:34
3.	"If Not for You"	New Morning, 1970	2:42
4.	"I'll Be Your Baby Tonight"	John Wesley Harding, 1968	2:38
5.	"I'll Keep It with Mine" (Bringing It All Back Home outtake, recorded 1/14/65)	previously unreleased	3:45
Total length:			14:57

Side two
No.	Title	Source	Length
1.	"The Times They Are a-Changin'"	The Times They Are A-Changin', 1964	3:13
2.	"Blowin' in the Wind"	The Freewheelin' Bob Dylan, 1963	2:47
3.	"Masters of War"	The Freewheelin' Bob Dylan, 1963	4:32
4.	"The Lonesome Death of Hattie Carroll"	The Times They Are A-Changin', 1964	5:46
5.	"Percy's Song" (The Times They Are A-Changin' outtake, recorded 10/23/63)	previously unreleased	7:42
Total length:			24:00

Side three
No.	Title	Source	Length
1.	"Mixed-Up Confusion"	A-side single, November 1962	2:28
2.	"Tombstone Blues"	Highway 61 Revisited, 1965	5:57
3.	"The Groom's Still Waiting at the Altar"	Shot of Love, 1981	4:04
4.	"Most Likely You Go Your Way"	Before the Flood, 1974	3:29
5.	"Like a Rolling Stone"	Highway 61 Revisited, 1965	6:09
6.	"Jet Pilot" (Blonde on Blonde outtake, recorded 10/65)	previously unreleased	0:49
Total length:			22:56

Side four
No.	Title	Source	Length
1.	"Lay Down Your Weary Tune" (The Times They Are A-Changin' outtake, recorded 10/24/63)	previously unreleased	4:36
2.	"Subterranean Homesick Blues"	Bringing It All Back Home, 1965	2:20
3.	"I Don't Believe You" (live at the ABC Theatre Belfast 5/6/66)	previously unreleased	5:18
4.	"Visions of Johanna" (live at The Royal Albert Hall 5/26/66)	previously unreleased	7:33
5.	"Every Grain of Sand"	Shot of Love, 1981	6:15
Total length:			26:02

Side five
No.	Title	Source	Length
1.	"Quinn the Eskimo (The Mighty Quinn)" (The Basement Tapes track, recorded 7/67)	previously unreleased	2:20
2.	"Mr. Tambourine Man"	Bringing It All Back Home, 1965	5:29
3.	"Dear Landlord"	John Wesley Harding, 1967	3:16
4.	"It Ain't Me, Babe"	Another Side of Bob Dylan, 1964	3:34
5.	"You Angel You"	Planet Waves, 1974	2:54
6.	"Million Dollar Bash"	The Basement Tapes, 1975	2:33
Total length:			20:06

Side six
No.	Title	Source	Length
1.	"To Ramona"	Another Side of Bob Dylan, 1964	3:54
2.	"You're a Big Girl Now" (Blood on the Tracks outtake, recorded 9/17/74, mistakenly labeled 9/25/74)	previously unreleased	4:23
3.	"Abandoned Love" (Desire outtake, recorded 7/75)	previously unreleased	4:29
4.	"Tangled Up in Blue"	Blood on the Tracks, 1975	5:45
5.	"It's All Over Now, Baby Blue" (live at the Free Trade Hall Manchester 5/17/66)	previously unreleased	5:40
Total length:			24:11

Side seven
No.	Title	Source	Length
1.	"Can You Please Crawl Out Your Window?"	A-side single, December 1965	3:34
2.	"Positively 4th Street"	A-side single, September 1965	3:54
3.	"Isis" (live at the Montreal Forum 12/4/75)	previously unreleased	5:21
4.	"Caribbean Wind" (Shot of Love outtake, recorded 4/30/81)	previously unreleased	5:54
5.	"Up to Me" (Blood on the Tracks outtake, recorded 9/19/74)	previously unreleased	6:18
Total length:			25:01

Side eight
No.	Title	Source	Length
1.	"Baby, I'm in the Mood for You" (The Freewheelin' Bob Dylan outtake, recorded 7/9/62)	previously unreleased	2:56
2.	"I Wanna Be Your Lover" (Blonde on Blonde outtake, recorded 10/65)	previously unreleased	3:27
3.	"I Want You"	Blonde on Blonde, 1966	3:07
4.	"Heart of Mine" (live in New Orleans 11/10/81)	previously unreleased	3:43
5.	"On a Night Like This"	Planet Waves, 1974	2:58
6.	"Just Like a Woman"	Blonde on Blonde, 1966	4:55
Total length:			21:06

Side nine
No.	Title	Source	Length
1.	"Romance in Durango" (live at the Montreal Forum 12/4/75)	previously unreleased	4:39
2.	"Señor (Tales of Yankee Power)"	Street-Legal, 1978	5:41
3.	"Gotta Serve Somebody"	Slow Train Coming, 1979	5:25
4.	"I Believe in You"	Slow Train Coming, 1979	5:10
5.	"Time Passes Slowly"	New Morning, 1970	2:36
Total length:			23:31

Side ten
No.	Title	Source	Length
1.	"I Shall Be Released"	Bob Dylan's Greatest Hits Vol. II, 1971	3:04
2.	"Knockin' on Heaven's Door"	Pat Garrett & Billy the Kid, 1973	2:30
3.	"All Along the Watchtower"	Before the Flood, 1974	3:04
4.	"Solid Rock"	Saved, 1980	3:58
5.	"Forever Young" (recording demo 6/73)	previously unreleased	2:02
Total length:			14:38

== Charts ==
Chart (1985)	Peak position
New Zealand Albums (RMNZ)	8
Norwegian Albums (VG-lista)	29
US Billboard 200	33
