= Dylan (1973 album) =

Studio album by Bob Dylan
- Released: November 16, 1973
- Recorded: April 1969, June 1970
- Genres: Rock; folk rock
- Length: 33:22
- Label: Columbia
- Producer: Bob Johnston

Bob Dylan chronology
Pat Garrett & Billy the Kid (1973)	Dylan (1973)	Planet Waves (1974)

Singles from Dylan
- 1. "A Fool Such as I" Released: November 1973

Dylan is the thirteenth studio album by singer-songwriter Bob Dylan, compiled from outtakes recorded for the two earlier albums, Self Portrait (June 1970) and New Morning (October 1970). Columbia Records compiled it with no input from Dylan, who had changed record companies to Asylum Records. It was released on November 16, 1973, the same month as the first news broke of the Bob Dylan and the Band 1974 Tour, Dylan's first major tour since 1966. The album consists of six cover songs and three traditional songs, with no original Dylan songs. It was poorly received, and is largely considered one of Dylan's weakest albums.

In Europe the album was re-released in January 1991 with the title Dylan (A Fool Such as I).

== Composition and recording ==
The album is made up from studio outtakes from the previous Dylan releases Self Portrait and New Morning. The nine songs featured on the album consist of six cover songs and three traditional songs, adapted and arranged by Dylan. The first seven tracks were recorded in June 1970 during the New Morning sessions, the last two were recorded in April 1969 during the Self Portrait sessions. The album features a different recording of "Spanish Is the Loving Tongue" from the version previously issued as the B-side of Dylan's 1971 single "Watching the River Flow".

The album cover was designed by art director John Berg. The original photograph featured on the album's front was shot by photographer Al Clayton. The serigraph was carried out by artist Richard Kenerson.

== Critical reception and reissues ==
Professional ratings
Review scores
Source	Rating
AllMusic	1/5 stars
Christgau's Record Guide	E
The Encyclopedia of Popular Music	1/5 stars
Entertainment Weekly	F
MusicHound	woof!
Rolling Stone	(unfavorable)
The Rolling Stone Album Guide	1/5 stars

Although Dylan received very poor reviews upon its release, it was certified gold by the RIAA. The album peaked at No. 17 in the U.S. and No. 13 in Canada, but became the first Bob Dylan release that failed to chart in the U.K.

Dylan was the only Columbia Dylan album not to be reissued on compact disc in the North American market, until 2013 when it was included in the Complete Album Collection box set.

Due to its lack of original material and 'bizarre' choice of tracks, Dylan is often considered one of Dylan's weakest albums.

== Songs ==
=== Side one ===
==== "Lily of the West" ====
"Lily of the West" is a traditional British and Irish folk song which, in Dylan's adaptation, details the story of a man who travels to Louisville and stumbles upon a woman named 'Flora'. The man then falls in love with her, naming her the 'Lily of the West', though this love is found not to be mutual when she is courted by another man. As a result, the protagonist confronts his 'rival' and stabs him in the chest in a fit of rage. Consequently, he is put on trial and found guilty of murder, though he maintains his love for Flora.

Dylan is likely to have known the song from at least as far back as the start of his relationship with Joan Baez, as she released a version of her own with similar lyrics in 1961 on her second album, Joan Baez, Vol. 2.

==== "Can't Help Falling in Love" ====
"Can't Help Falling in Love" is a 1961 song recorded by Elvis Presley, inspired by Plaisir d'amour, an 18th-century French love song, and included on the soundtrack album Blue Hawaii.

==== "Sarah Jane" ====
"Sarah Jane" is inspired by "Rock about my Saro Jane", written sometime around the turn of the 20th century and most notably performed by Uncle Dave Macon in 1927.

"Sarah Jane" is often mentioned among Dylan's worst recordings.

==== "The Ballad of Ira Hayes" ====
"The Ballad of Ira Hayes" is a song originally written by Peter La Farge and popularised by Johnny Cash, which describes the life of Marine Ira Hayes of the Pima Indians. Hayes enlisted in the US Marine Corps in 1942 and fought in the Pacific Theatre of World War II, deployed in the Bougainville campaign before fighting in the Battle of Iwo Jima. Whilst serving in Iwo Jima, he was photographed by Joe Rosenthal alongside five of his comrades raising the American flag atop Mount Suribachi. After the end of the war in 1945 and his subsequent discharge from the army, Hayes suffered from post-traumatic stress disorder and took to heavy alcohol use to combat it (referenced by the recurring lyric "call him drunken Ira Hayes"). Attempting to reintegrate into civilian life, he struggled to maintain employment and was arrested a total of 52 times for offences relating to alcohol. Two months after attending the Marine Corps War Memorial, Hayes was found dead near his residence in Sacaton, Arizona after spending the evening drinking with his closest friends. The cause of his death was given as exposure and alcohol poisoning.

=== Side two ===
==== "Mr. Bojangles" ====
"Mr. Bojangles" was written by American country musician Jerry Jeff Walker in 1968 and recorded in 1970 by Dylan during the sessions for New Morning. It tells the story of a homeless street performer that Walker had met in a New Orleans jail whilst imprisoned for public intoxication who used the moniker "Mr. Bojangles", likely taken from Bill 'Bojangles' Robinson. "Mr. Bojangles" and his cellmates conversed on many topics, at some point landing on the death of his dog who had become his only companion whilst travelling around the country. As the mood in the cell dampened, someone in the cell asked for something to lighten the mood, at which point "Mr. Bojangles" performed a tap dance.

==== "Mary Ann" ====
"Mary Ann" is a folk song originating from at least as far back as the ethnomusicology of Marius Barbeau, a Canadian folklorist, and perhaps as far back as the mid 19th century. It describes the parting of a man from his love, "Mary Ann", to faraway at sea.

==== "Big Yellow Taxi" ====
"Big Yellow Taxi" is a song written by Joni Mitchell in 1970, released originally on the album Ladies of the Canyon, reaching the top 20 in Canada, Australia and the UK and peaking at No. 67 in the United States. It is known famously as an early environmentalist song, with lyrics against consumerism and urban sprawl. In contrast, Dylan's version was criticised at release as a simple outtake from the New Morning sessions, though retrospectively it has been given praise due to Dylan's vocal performance.

==== "A Fool Such As I" ====
"A Fool Such As I" is a popular song written by Bill Trader, copyrighted in 1952 and released by Hank Snow in early 1953 as "(Now and Then There's) A Fool Such as I". Elvis Presley's 1958 version, which reached No. 2 in the US and went platinum, could have served as Dylan's inspiration.

==== "Spanish Is the Loving Tongue" ====
"Spanish Is the Loving Tongue" is a song based on the 1907 poem "A Border Affair" written by Charles Badger Clark, a cowboy poet.

== Track listing ==
Side one
No.	Title	Writer(s)	Recorded	Length
1.	"Lily of the West"	traditional	June 3, 1970 (Note: New Morning outtake.)	3:44
2.	"Can't Help Falling in Love"	George Weiss, Hugo Peretti, Luigi Creatore	June 3, 1970	4:17
3.	"Sarah Jane"	traditional	June 1, 1970	2:43
4.	"The Ballad of Ira Hayes"	Peter LaFarge	June 1, 1970	5:08
Total length:				15:52

Side two
No.	Title	Writer(s)	Recorded	Length
1.	"Mr. Bojangles"	Jerry Jeff Walker	June 2, 1970	5:31
2.	"Mary Ann"	traditional	June 2, 1970	2:40
3.	"Big Yellow Taxi"	Joni Mitchell	June 4, 1970	2:12
4.	"A Fool Such as I"	Bill Trader	April 26, 1969 (Note: Self Portrait outtake.)	2:41
5.	"Spanish Is the Loving Tongue"	Billy Simon, Charles Badger Clark	April 24, 1969	4:13
Total length:				17:17
