= Lay Down Your Weary Tune =

Song written by Bob Dylan

- Cover of the M. Witmark & Sons sheet music

Song by Bob Dylan

from the album Biograph
- Released: November 7, 1985
- Recorded: October 24, 1963
- Studio: Columbia, New York City
- Genre: American folk music
- Length: 4:36
- Label: Columbia
- Songwriter(s): Bob Dylan
- Producer(s): Tom Wilson

"Lay Down Your Weary Tune" is a song written by Bob Dylan in 1963. Dylan originally recorded it for his album The Times They Are a-Changin', but his version of the song was not officially released until 1985 on the Biograph box set. In the album liner notes, Dylan claims that in the song he was trying to capture the feeling of a Scottish ballad he had just heard on a 78 rpm record. The specific ballad Dylan was referring to has not been identified, but speculation includes "The Water Is Wide", "O Waly, Waly" and "I Wish, I Wish".

Los Angeles folk rock group the Byrds recorded "Lay Down Your Weary Tune" for their 1965 album Turn! Turn! Turn! The song was subsequently recorded by several artists.

== Writing and performance ==
Dylan wrote the song at Joan Baez's house in Carmel, California, in late 1963. During the same visit, he also wrote the song "The Lonesome Death of Hattie Carroll". Dylan had originally wanted to sing "Lay Down Your Weary Tune" with Baez at her October 12, 1963, concert at the Hollywood Bowl, but Baez was not yet comfortable with the song. Dylan recorded the song in a single take on October 24, 1963, during the sessions for The Times They Are a-Changin. However, he decided to replace it on the album with the song "Restless Farewell", a song he wrote as an angry response to a Newsweek reporter who in late October 1963 published a story about Dylan of which Dylan did not approve. In the interim, Dylan played "Lay Down Your Weary Tune" at a concert at Carnegie Hall on October 26, which was eventually released on the album Live at Carnegie Hall 1963. The song also appears on the Dylan compilation Side Tracks.

== Critical reception ==
Music critic Robert Shelton has described "Lay Down Your Weary Tune" as Dylan's "first withdrawal song", while journalist Paul Williams interpreted it as Dylan describing an auditory "vision" of a message from the universe or deity personified in music. Williams has also noted that throughout the song we hear Dylan struggling to put into words the melody that haunts him. Like Williams, author Seth Rogovoy similarly interpreted it as a song devoted to Dylan's musical muse, like the later "Mr. Tambourine Man". In his controversial 1970 article, "Bob Dylan and the Poetry of Salvation", sociologist Steven Goldberg identified it as a song with which Dylan's focus changed from politics to mysticism. Music critic Michael Gray interprets the song as, "a vision of the world, that is, in which nature appears not as a manifestation of God but as containing God in every aspect". Gray also described the song as, "one of the very greatest and most haunting creations in our language". Christian theologian Stephen H. Webb has linked many of the images of the song to the Bible and calls it "one of the greatest theological songs since King David composed his psalms."

== Melody and structure ==
The song is in the key of A major, and begins with the chorus:

Lay down your weary tune, lay down
Lay down the song you strum
And rest yourself 'neath the strength of strings
No voice can hope to hum

The text alternates between lines of four and three feet, which is a metric pattern shared by ballad stanzas and many hymns, referred to generally as common measure.

The song's chorus and five verses share a similar fourteen bar melody, although the melody is varied slightly each time. The version of the melody used for the chorus has greater guitar accompaniment than the verses, based on the chords of A major, D major and E major, providing a literal "strength of strings" to the chorus.

The verses do not attempt to tell a story, but instead provide a series of images of nature. The chorus is in the second person, and apparently is someone—possibly a deified personification of music—offering Dylan rest and freedom from his burdens. In the verses, sounds from nature are contrasted with man-made sounds, particularly in lines such as "The morning breeze like a bugle blew," "The crashin' waves like cymbals clashed," "The cryin' rain like a trumpet sang," "The branches bare like a banjo moaned" and "The water smooth ran like a hymn." But the chorus continually reminds us of the divide between natural and man-made sounds with the line "No voice can hope to hum," carrying the implicit meaning "No human voice can hope to hum."

== The Byrds version ==
"Lay Down Your Weary Tune"

Song by the Byrds

from the album Turn! Turn! Turn!
- Released: December 6, 1965
- Recorded: October 22, 1965
- Studio: Columbia, Hollywood, California
- Genre: Folk rock
- Length: 3:30
- Label: Columbia
- Songwriter(s): Bob Dylan
- Producer(s): Terry Melcher

Although Dylan's recording of the song went unreleased during the 1960s, the Los Angeles folk rock band the Byrds acquired "Lay Down Your Weary Tune" through Dylan's publisher and included a rendition of it on their second album Turn! Turn! Turn!, released in December 1965. Upon hearing the Byrds' version, Dylan told the band's frontman Roger McGuinn "Up until I heard this I thought you were just another imitator ... but this has got real feeling to it." Dylan's enthusiasm for the group's recording of the song was not shared by the Byrds' manager Jim Dickson, as he explained to author Johnny Rogan in 1989: "They didn't do it as well as they could have done ... it was too monotonous and didn't bring its message across. The lyrics didn't come across in the music." Dickson's dissatisfaction with the group's interpretation of the song was echoed by the Byrds' producer Terry Melcher, who noted during an interview that "the production was lousy" and that the recording was "sloppy from start to finish." Byrds bassist Chris Hillman contributes to the song's harmony vocals and as such, marks his vocal debut on a Byrds' recording.

== Other renditions ==
Jeff Tamarkin writes in his biography of Jefferson Airplane that their first manager, Matthew Katz, wooed them by bragging that he had access to an unreleased Dylan song called "Lay Down Your Weary Tune". A concert performance of the song by the Airplane from January 15 or 16, 1966, at the Kitsalano (Kits) Theater, in Vancouver, Canada, remains unreleased.

Besides Bob Dylan and the Byrds, artists who have recorded the song in the 1960s include Bill Henderson, who released the song on When My Dreamboat Comes Home in 1965 and Jim and Jean, who released it on Changes in 1966. Other artists who subsequently covered the song include McGuinness Flint, Ashley Hutchings, Fairport Convention, Tim O'Brien and the 13th Floor Elevators and Mary Black.

Irish singer Seán Keane sang "Lay Down Your Weary Tune" on his 1998 album No Stranger.

The Amnesty International 2012 compilation of Bob Dylan covers, Chimes of Freedom: The Songs of Bob Dylan includes a version of "Lay Down Your Weary Tune" by Billy Bragg.

The 2011 Red House Records compilation of Bob Dylan covers, A Nod to Bob 2: An Artists' Tribute to Bob Dylan on his 70th Birthday includes a version of "Lay Down Your Weary Tune" by Storyhill.

Additionally, Gene Clark, singer and songwriter for the Byrds, released a song on his 1974 album No Other titled "Strength of Strings", an allusion to the refrain of "Lay Down Your Weary Tune": "And rest yourself 'neath the strength of strings...".
