= Watching the River Flow =

1971 single by Bob Dylan

- West German picture sleeve

Single by Bob Dylan
- B-side: "Spanish Is the Loving Tongue"
- Released: June 3, 1971
- Recorded: March 16–19, 1971
- Studio: Blue Rock, New York City
- Genre: Blues rock
- Length: 3:34
- Label: Columbia
- Songwriter: Bob Dylan
- Producer: Leon Russell

Bob Dylan singles chronology
"If Not for You" (1971)	"Watching the River Flow" (1971)	"George Jackson" (1971)

"Watching the River Flow" is a song by the American singer Bob Dylan. Produced by Leon Russell, it was written and recorded during a session in March 1971 at the Blue Rock Studio in New York City. The collaboration with Russell formed in part through Dylan's desire for a new sound—after a period of immersion in country rock music—and for a change from his previous producer.

The song was praised by critics for its energy and distinctive vocals, guitar, and piano. It has been interpreted as Dylan's account of his writer's block in the early 1970s and of his wish to deliver less politically engaged material and to find a new balance between public and private life.

Charting in the Netherlands, the United Kingdom, Canada, and the United States, the song was included on the 1971 Bob Dylan's Greatest Hits Vol. II and other Dylan compilation albums. In 2011, five current and former Rolling Stones appeared on a recording of "Watching the River Flow" as part of a tribute project for pianist Ian Stewart. The song has been covered by the Earl Scruggs Revue, Steve Gibbons, Colin James, Russell, and many others.

== Writing and recording ==
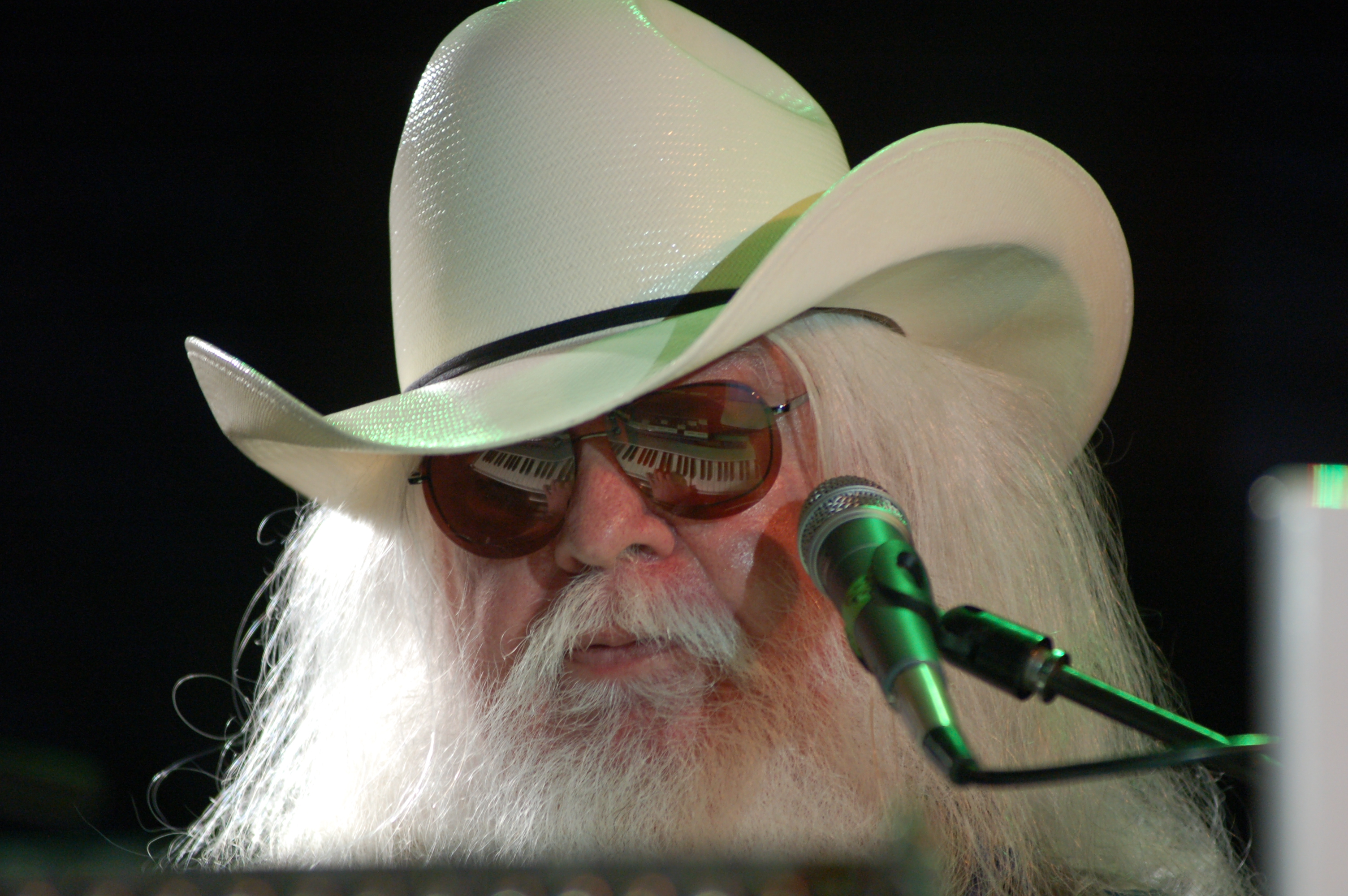
Leon Russell (pictured in 2009) was the producer of "Watching the River Flow".

Between 1967 and 1970, Bob Dylan recorded and released a series of albums that incorporated country rock elements. All were produced by Bob Johnston. During the sessions for the last of these, New Morning, Dylan decided that he did not want to continue working with Johnston. (Note: According to biographer Howard Sounes, Dylan became annoyed when Johnston left to take part in a European tour with Leonard Cohen. Johnston told Sounes: "I took off and figured he would call. I don't really know what happened ... I think it was just I wasn't around, or he wanted a change.") Al Kooper did uncredited production work to help Dylan finish the album. For his next recording session, Dylan asked Leon Russell, who made his name with Joe Cocker, to assist in finding a new sound.

The recording session took place at Blue Rock Studio in New York City on March 16–19, 1971. Russell assembled a backing group that included Carl Radle on bass, Jesse Ed Davis on guitar, and Jim Keltner on drums. Blue Rock co-owners Eddie Korvin and Joe Schick were the engineers. On the first day in the studio, Dylan, on acoustic guitar and vocals, led the band through a rehearsal jam that included covers of "Spanish Harlem", "That Lucky Old Sun", "I'm A Ladies Man" (Hank Snow), "Blood Red River" (Josh White), and "I'm Alabama Bound" (Lead Belly version). On the second day, after a brief rehearsal, "Watching the River Flow" was recorded with Dylan singing live with the band. "When I Paint My Masterpiece" was recorded in similar fashion on the third day, and a mixing of both songs took place on the last day.

"Watching the River Flow" was based on studio jams done at Blue Rock, and uses a chord progression in the key of F major. Russell recalled that, when developing the song, the basic track was formed and that Dylan then wrote the lyrics in several minutes. Jim Keltner has also reported that Dylan wrote the songs at the Blue Rock session quickly: "I remember Bob ... had a pencil and a notepad, and he was writing a lot. He was writing these songs on the spot in the studio, or finishing them up at least."

"Watching the River Flow"
The sound on "Watching the River Flow" features what writer Anthony Varesi has described as "rollicking" piano and "blistering" guitar.

The music of "Watching the River Flow"—whose feel the journalist Bob Spitz has likened to Dylan's "Leopard-Skin Pill-Box Hat" (1966)—has been described by different critics as a "[b]lues-powered sound [that cascades] like clumps of flotsam and jetsam", as "featur[ing] some blistering guitar work ... and rollicking piano work from Russell", and as "an energetic, funky-gospel rocker". The recording has been praised for the dynamic way in which Dylan's vocal mannerisms bounce off Russell's characteristic stride piano playing. Biographer Clinton Heylin has pointed out that Dylan borrowed the line "If I had wings and I could fly" from the song "The Water is Wide" and words from "Old Man River" for his composition.

Four and a half months after the recording session, on August 1, Russell backed Dylan on bass at the Concert for Bangladesh, organized by George Harrison. In November 1971, Russell accompanied Dylan into a studio again to record Dylan's next single, "George Jackson". At this session, Russell once more played bass. Joe Schick, the manager of Blue Rock in 1971, has commented that although Dylan and Russell had a reasonably friendly relationship, their rapport was not strong enough to record an album together. Indeed, Heylin noted in 2009 that Russell had not recorded with Dylan again; however, they did tour together in 2011. Russell died in 2016.

The B-side of "Watching the River Flow" was "Spanish Is the Loving Tongue" (written by Charles Badger Clark–Billy Simon). Dylan used the second of two takes of the song recorded during the New Morning sessions on June 2, 1970, in Columbia Studios in New York City. Musicians at these sessions included Bob Dylan, vocal, guitar, harmonica, and piano; Al Kooper, organ; Charlie Daniels, bass; David Bromberg, guitar, dobro; Russ Kunkel, drums; Ron Cornelius, guitar. (Note: The "Watching the River Flow" B-side version was later also included on the compilation albums Mr. D's Collection Number 1 (1974), Masterpieces (1978), and Pure Dylan – An Intimate Look at Bob Dylan (2011). Dylan has released six other recordings of "Spanish is the Loving Tongue": an April 24, 1969 version from the Self Portrait sessions, on Dylan (1973); the first take from the June 2, 1970 session, on The Bootleg Series Vol. 10: Another Self Portrait (2013); a 1967 recording with the Band on The Bootleg Series Vol. 11: The Basement Tapes Complete (2014); a performance during the Blood on the Tracks recording sessions at A&R Studios, New York on September 17, 1974, which was released on The Bootleg Series Vol. 14: More Blood, More Tracks (2018); a tour rehearsal recording from October 19, 1975 at New York's S.I.R. studios on Bob Dylan – The Rolling Thunder Revue: The 1975 Live Recordings (2019); and the first take from a March 3, 1970 session on 1970, released in 2021. Dylan has performed the song in concert once in his career, on May 11, 1976, in San Antonio, Texas.)

== Release and charts ==
The song was released as a single on June 3, 1971. In the US, Columbia Records' promotion included a full-page Billboard advertisement, declaring the track as "A unique new single by Bob Dylan." The advertisement contained a photograph of Dylan holding a camera to his eye.

It reached the top 30 in Canada, the Netherlands, and the United Kingdom, and reached No. 41 on the US Billboard charts. Billboard writer Paul Grein has noted that it was the second consecutive American Dylan single, after 1970's "Wigwam", to miss the top 40 by one spot. (Note: Between these two American releases—in spring 1971—the single "If Not for You" was released in European countries. In the Netherlands, it reached number 5 on the Dutch Top 40 chart and number 30 on the Dutch Single Top 100 chart.) On November 17, 1971, "Watching the River Flow" appeared on Bob Dylan's Greatest Hits Vol. II. It was later included on the compilations Greatest Hits, Vol. 1–3 (2003), Playlist: The Very Best of Bob Dylan '70s (2009), and Beyond Here Lies Nothin': The Collection (2011).

Chart (1971)	Peak position
Canadian RPM Singles Chart	19
Dutch Single Top 100	18
Dutch Top 40	24
UK Singles Chart	24
US Billboard Hot 100	41

== Critical comments ==
Biographer Robert Shelton wrote that in the early 1970s, Dylan was frequently criticized for "selling out" and that people were pressuring him to go back to his earlier trend of composing protest songs. (Note: Dylan wrote most of his protest songs in the early 1960s. Even in 1966, and still in the early 1970s, some of his fans were unhappy that he had abandoned protest music.) For Shelton, who noted the promotional photo for "Watching the River Flow" depicting Dylan looking through a camera, the track expressed Dylan's wish just to be an observer, and not a political activist. Author Seth Rogovoy similarly interpreted the song as Dylan's desire to ignore politics and avoid getting involved in people's disputes. The line "[This ol' river] keeps on rollin', though/No matter ... which way the wind does blow" has been heard by writers Peter Vernezze and Carl J. Porter as evidence of Dylan's conviction that "the river of time, the flow of facts, in reality remains unaffected by winds of beliefs, the flow of changing opinions."

Greil Marcus highlighted the importance of disregarding one's initial reading of the song. "The first impression is that Bob Dylan is setting up the usual private scene: 'I'll sit here and watch the river flow.' Well, that's certainly a boring idea." He went on to describe how Dylan explores the difficulty of retaining privacy while making public art; the singer is coming to terms with unwanted attention inherent in stardom, without giving up his connection to his fans. Marcus argued that the reason the single was not a hit in the US was because "the time has passed when people are interested in hearing Bob Dylan say he'll just sit there and watch the river flow ... even though that's not quite what he's saying". For Marcus, "Watching the River Flow" is a compelling work, but the subtlety of the song may have prevented it from reaching a wide audience.

Clinton Heylin and writer Christopher Ricks discussed Dylan's restlessness in the song. Heylin said that in "Ballad of Easy Rider", co-written by Dylan and Roger McGuinn two years earlier, Dylan claimed he was content to watch while "The river flows, flows to the sea/Wherever it flows, that's where I want to be"; by contrast, in "Watching the River Flow", Dylan writes that he wants to be moving, wishing he was "back in the city/Instead of this old bank of sand". Ricks found Dylan's unsettledness at odds with the implied bucolic notion of watching the river flow. For Ricks, the vocal phrasing and the musical arrangements clash with the lyrics; the "choppy" rhythms and "stroppy stomping" of the backing track, disrupt the theme of contentedly watching the river. He noted that two of the verses begin with "People disagreeing", introducing conflict into the song, and concluded that "Watching the River Flow" is "tarred with a realism that qualifies and complicates the lure of the lazy".

Heylin heard in the composition Dylan's admission that in 1971 he felt uninspired about writing lyrics and had no specific ideas he wanted to voice. The biographer placed this avowal in the context of changing, polarized critical estimates of Dylan's work in the late 1960s and early 1970s. In June 1970, Dylan had released Self Portrait, an album that received very negative reviews; Dylan's next album that year, New Morning, was viewed much more favorably by critics, and Ralph Gleason declared "We've got Dylan back again!" For Heylin, Dylan's assertion in the song that he does not have any particular message to express, is an attempt to subvert critics like Gleason. (Note: In his autobiography, Chronicles, Dylan expressed his disgust at the term "Spokesman" that he felt the press had foisted on him: "The press never let up. Once in a while I would have to rise up and offer myself for an interview so they wouldn't beat the door down. Later an article would hit the streets with the headline "Spokesman Denies That He's A Spokesman". I felt like a piece of meat that someone had thrown to the dogs.") Heylin wrote that both "Watching the River Flow" and "When I Paint My Masterpiece" discuss Dylan's professed lack of inspiration at the time in an honest and satisfying way. Pointing to the fact that Dylan made no attempt to record either a single or an album in the following year of 1972, he commented that "Dylan had now concluded that he must simply sit by that bank of sand and await [his muse's] return."

Ian Bell, in his critical biography of Dylan, wrote that it was "no accident" that both "Watching The River Flow" and "When I Paint My Masterpiece" made much the same statement. Bell argued that "When I Paint My Masterpiece" is the better song as it is the funnier of the two. Bell heard Dylan mocking both his admirers and his own reputation in this composition, while he detected in "Watching The River Flow" an admission that "If creativity is a habit, Dylan was all but cured."

== Personnel ==
The musicians who recorded "Watching the River Flow" are:

- Bob Dylan – vocals
- Leon Russell – acoustic piano, production
- Jesse Ed Davis – electric guitar
- Carl Radle (called Charlie Radle on the session notes) – electric bass
- Jim Keltner – drums

== Live performances and covers ==
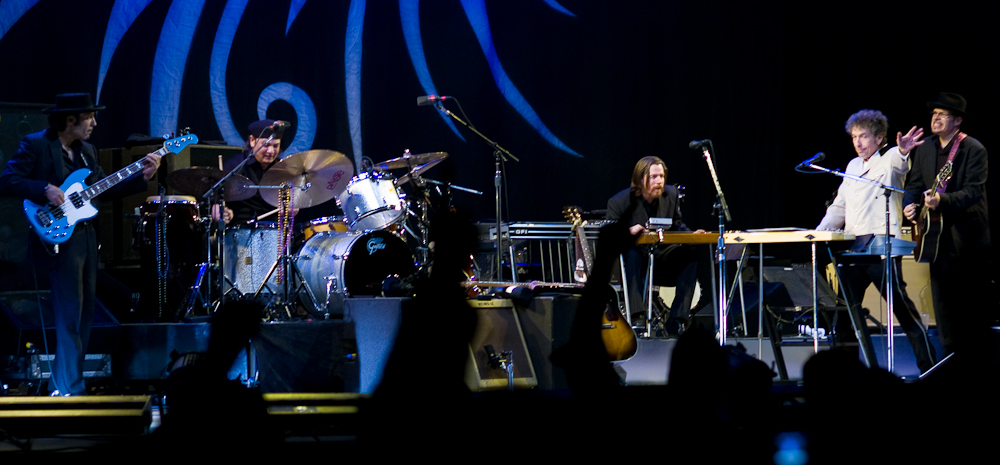
Dylan (second from right) playing at the Spektrum in Oslo, Norway, on March 30, 2007, one of hundreds of concerts where he has performed "Watching the River Flow".

Dylan first performed the song live on November 21, 1978, in El Paso, Texas, and again, two days later, in Norman, Oklahoma. He did not play it in concert again until July 19, 1987, in Eugene, Oregon; from that point on, he has often included the song in his sets. According to his official website, Dylan has performed the song 778 times as of June 2026.

The song was featured in Dylan's 2021 concert film Shadow Kingdom: The Early Songs of Bob Dylan, which was available to stream on the Veeps.com platform for a week beginning on July 18.

On April 18, 2011, musician Ben Waters released the album Boogie 4 Stu, a tribute to the late Rolling Stones pianist Ian Stewart, including a version of "Watching the River Flow" featuring the Rolling Stones' Mick Jagger, Keith Richards, Charlie Watts, and Ronnie Wood, as well as former member Bill Wyman. The five Rolling Stones recorded their contributions separately, in different studios at different times, but the track constituted the first time in almost 20 years that Wyman had recorded on the same song as his former bandmates. The choice of the song was based on Ian Stewart's judgment that "Watching the River Flow" was "the only decent thing Bob Dylan ever did".

The song has been covered by numerous other artists, including Seatrain (1973), the Earl Scruggs Revue (1976), Steve Gibbons (1977), Joe Cocker (1978), Steve Forbert in the I-10 Chronicles (2001), Ken Saydak (2001), Colin James (2005), Asylum Street Spankers (2006), and Steve Gadd (2010). Leon Russell released his own version in 1999 on the compilation Tangled Up in Blues. Deep Purple covered the song for their cover album Turning to Crime (2021).
