= Suze (The Cough Song) =

1963 song by Bob Dylan

Song by Bob Dylan

from the album The Bootleg Series Volumes 1–3 (Rare & Unreleased) 1961–1991
- Released: March 26, 1991
- Recorded: October 24, 1963
- Studio: Columbia A, New York
- Length: 1:59
- Label: Columbia
- Songwriter(s): Bob Dylan
- Producer(s): Tom Wilson

Official audio/video
- "Suze (The Cough Song)" on YouTube

"Suze (The Cough Song)" is a song by American singer-songwriter Bob Dylan, recorded in 1963 during the sessions for his third studio album, The Times They Are a-Changin' (1964). The song was written and performed by Dylan, and produced by Tom Wilson. It was released on The Bootleg Series Volumes 1–3 (Rare & Unreleased) 1961–1991 (1991).

== Background and recording ==
"Suze (The Cough Song)" was written by Bob Dylan and recorded during the fifth of the sessions for his third album The Times They Are a-Changin' (1964), at Columbia A, New York, on October 24, 1963. It was the first instrumental track ever recorded by Dylan. Dylan plays guitar and harmonica on the track, with Tom Wilson producing. Only one take was attempted. Dylan played the guitar by fingerpicking in the Piedmont blues style that had previously been used by artists such as Elizabeth Cotten and Mississippi John Hurt. The guitar is in standard E tuning, with a capo at the fourth fret. In scholar Todd Harvey's survey of 70 of Dylan's early song recordings, Dylan uses a similar fingerpicking style in about 12 of them, including "Don't Think Twice, It's All Right" (1963) and "One Too Many Mornings" (1964).

The "Suze" of the title is thought to be Suze Rotolo, Dylan's girlfriend in the early 1960s. The addition of "The Cough Song" is presumed to be because Dylan started coughing 90 seconds into the recording, until saying that the song ended before his coughing started and asking Wilson to fade it out. Harvey noted that five sections of the song were recorded: a stanza, the stanza repeated, a bridge, and two further repetitions of the stanza. The coughing occurs, and the track is interrupted, as Dylan is about to return to the bridge. He plays harmonica in addition to guitar during the bridge and the stanza's return. According to Harvey, the stanzas and bridge "have four phrases each and, in duple meter, each phrase is four bars long. The Stanza has an ABA^{1}C phrase structure, and the bridge a DDEF phrase structure."

Journalist and author John Bauldie, who wrote the liner notes for The Bootleg Series Volumes 1–3 (Rare & Unreleased) 1961–1991, detected similarities between the track and "Mexican Rag" recorded by Jimmie Tarlton in 1930. He felt that it "loosely prefigures" "Nashville Skyline Rag", which appeared on Dylan's Nashville Skyline (1969). Harvey noted similarities in the opening melody and the picking pattern to Dylan's "Percy's Song", which had been recorded the previous day.

== Release and reception ==
The song was an outtake from the album sessions, and was later released on The Bootleg Series Volumes 1–3 (Rare & Unreleased) 1961–1991 on March 26, 1991. The track has a duration of one minute and 59 seconds. Harvey described Dylan's guitar playing as "not a brilliant piece of fingerpicking", noting that there are "muffled tones and slips". A similar assessment comes from authors Philippe Margotin and Jean-Michel Guesdon, who felt that the playing "lacks precision and rigor"; they considered it "closer to a working piece than a finished tune". Author John Nogowski called the track a "hilarious improvisation" and gave it a rating of B+. In the Winston-Salem Journal, critic Ed Bumgardner suggested that "Suze (The Cough Song)" was one of several songs on The Bootleg Series Volumes 1–3 to "offer an intimacy and charming human touch often lost in the analytical deification of Dylan".

== Personnel ==
Musician

- Bob Dylan – voice, guitar, harmonica

Technical

- Tom Wilson – producer
- George Knuerr – sound engineer
- Pete Dauria – sound engineer
