= The Times They Are a-Changin' (Bob Dylan album) =

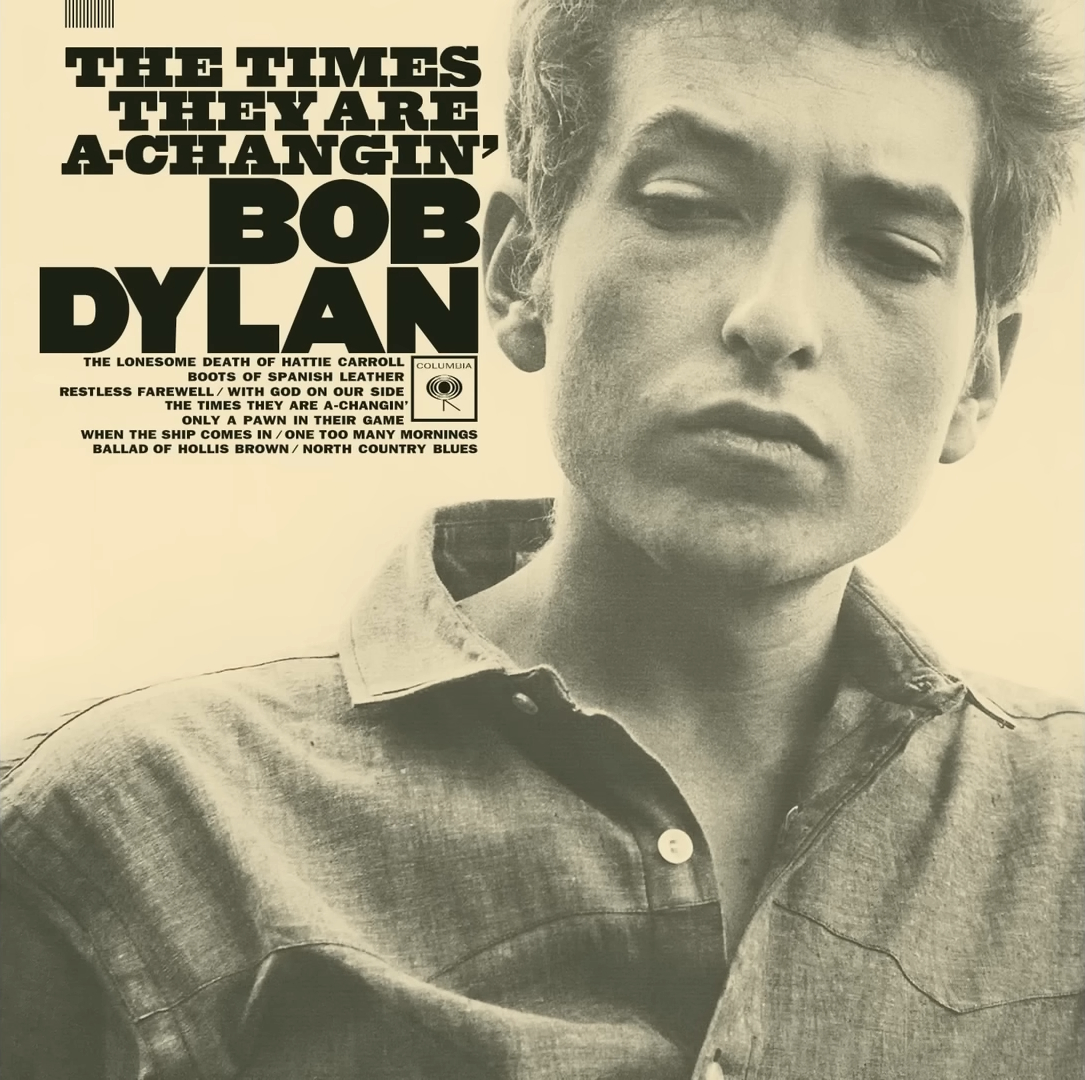

Studio album by Bob Dylan
- Released: February 10, 1964
- Recorded: August 6 – October 31, 1963
- Studio: Columbia 7th Ave (New York City)
- Genre: Folk
- Length: 45:36
- Label: Columbia
- Producer: Tom Wilson

Bob Dylan chronology
The Freewheelin' Bob Dylan (1963)	The Times They Are a-Changin' (1964)	Another Side of Bob Dylan (1964)

Singles from The Times They Are a-Changin'
- 1. "The Times They Are a-Changin'" Released: March 8, 1965

The Times They Are a-Changin' is the third studio album by the American singer-songwriter Bob Dylan. It was released on February 10, 1964, through Columbia Records. Whereas his previous albums, Bob Dylan (1962) and The Freewheelin' Bob Dylan (1963), combined original material and cover songs, this was the first to feature only original compositions. The album consists mostly of stark, sparsely arranged ballads concerning issues such as racism, poverty, and social change. The title track is one of Dylan's most famous; many feel that it captures the spirit of social and political upheaval that characterized the 1960s.

While it was still acclaimed, some critics and fans were not quite as taken with the album as a whole, relative to his previous work, for its lack of humor or musical diversity. Still, The Times They Are a-Changin' peaked at No. 20 on the US chart, eventually going gold, and belatedly reaching No. 4 in the UK in 1965.

== Recording sessions ==
Promotional photo of Dylan in a recording studio, c. 1963

Dylan began work on his third album on August 6, 1963, at Columbia's Studio A, located at 799 Seventh Avenue in New York City. Once again, Tom Wilson was the producer for the entire album. Dylan had, by the time of recording, become a popular, influential cultural figure.

Eight songs were recorded during that first session, but only one recording of "North Country Blues" was ultimately deemed usable and set aside as the master take. A master take of "Seven Curses" was also recorded, but it was left out of the final album sequence.

Another session at Studio A was held the following day, this time yielding master takes for four songs: "Ballad of Hollis Brown", "With God on Our Side", "Only a Pawn in Their Game", and "Boots of Spanish Leather", all of which were later included on the final album sequence.

A third session was held in Studio A on August 12, but nothing from this session was deemed usable. However, three recordings taken from the third session eventually saw official release: "master" takes of "Paths of Victory," "Moonshine Blues," and "Only a Hobo" were all included on The Bootleg Series Volumes 1–3 (Rare & Unreleased) 1961–1991 released in 1991. In 2013, "Eternal Circle" (Take 4), "Hero Blues" was included in the 1963 entry of The 50th Anniversary Collection 1963.

Sessions did not resume for more than two months. During the interim, Dylan toured briefly with Joan Baez, performing a number of key concerts that raised his profile in the media. When Dylan returned to Studio A on October 23, he had six more original compositions ready for recording. Master takes for "The Lonesome Death of Hattie Carroll" and "When the Ship Comes In" were both culled from the October 23 session. A master take for "Percy's Song" was also recorded, but it was ultimately set aside and was not officially released until Biograph in 1985. An alternate take on "Percy's Song," a "That's All Right" (Arthur Crudup)/"Sally Free and Easy" (Cyril Tawney) medley and "East Laredo Blues" were released in 2013 on the 1963 entry of The 50th Anniversary Collection 1963.

Another session was held the following day, October 24. Master takes of "The Times They Are a-Changin'" and "One Too Many Mornings" were recorded and later included in the final album sequence. A master take for "Lay Down Your Weary Tune" was also recorded, but ultimately left out of the final album; it was eventually released on Biograph. Two more outtakes, "Eternal Circle" and "Suze (The Cough Song)", were later issued on The Bootleg Series Volumes 1–3 (Rare & Unreleased) 1961–1991. A final outtake, "New Orleans Rag", was released in 2013 on The 50th Anniversary Collection 1963.

The sixth and final session for The Times They Are a-Changin' was held on October 31, 1963. The entire session focused on one song — "Restless Farewell"— whose melody is taken from an Irish-Scots folk song, "The Parting Glass", and it produced a master take that ultimately closed the album.

== Songs ==
The Times They Are a-Changin' opens with the title track, one of Dylan's most well-known songs. Dylan's friend, Tony Glover, recalls visiting Dylan's apartment in September 1963, where he saw a number of song manuscripts and poems lying on a table. "The Times They Are a-Changin'" had yet to be recorded, but Glover saw its early manuscript. After reading the words "come senators, congressmen, please heed the call", Glover reportedly asked Dylan: "What is this shit, man?", to which Dylan responded, "Well, you know, it seems to be what the people like to hear".

Dylan recalled writing the song as a deliberate attempt to create an anthem of change for the moment. In 1985, he told Cameron Crowe: "This was definitely a song with a purpose. It was influenced of course by the Irish and Scottish ballads ... 'Come All Ye Bold Highway Men', 'Come All Ye Tender Hearted Maidens'. I wanted to write a big song, with short concise verses that piled up on each other in a hypnotic way. The civil rights movement and the folk music movement were pretty close for a while and allied together at that time."

The climactic lines of the final verse: "The order is rapidly fadin'/ And the first one now/ Will later be last/ For the times they are a-changin'" have a Biblical ring, and several critics have connected them with lines in the Gospel of Mark, 10:31, "But many that are first shall be last, and the last first."

A self-conscious protest song, it is often viewed as a reflection of the generation gap and of the political divide marking American culture in the 1960s. Dylan, however, disputed this interpretation in 1964, saying "Those were the only words I could find to separate aliveness from deadness. It had nothing to do with age." A year later, Dylan would say: "I can't really say that adults don't understand young people any more than you can say big fishes don't understand little fishes. I didn't mean "The Times They Are a-Changin'" as a statement ... It's a feeling."

"Ballad of Hollis Brown" was originally recorded for Dylan's previous album, The Freewheelin' Bob Dylan (1963). That version was rejected and the song was eventually re-recorded for The Times They Are a-Changin'. Described by Clinton Heylin as a "'tragic tale of independence and free will' culled from the folk idiom", it is a grim, rural Gothic story of a father killing his starving family ("There's seven people dead on a South Dakota farm").

"With God on Our Side" was first performed at New York's Town Hall on April 12, 1963 (which also happened to be Dylan's debut appearance at that venue). Although Dylan claims it is an original composition, the melody to "With God on Our Side" bears a striking resemblance to "The Patriot Game", the lyrics of which were written by Dominic Behan and the melody borrowed from the traditional Irish folk song, "The Merry Month of May". Behan called Dylan a plagiarist and a thief, in an attempt to goad Dylan into a lawsuit; Dylan made no response. "The Patriot Game" was originally introduced to Dylan by Scottish folk singer Nigel Denver. Scottish songwriter Jim McLean recalls Dylan asking him in late 1962: "'What does it mean, 'Patriot Game?' ... I explained—probably lectured him—about Dr. Johnson, who's one of Dominic's favourite writers, and that's where Dominic picked up [the] saying: 'Patriotism is the last refuge of a scoundrel.'" Music critic Tim Riley writes: "'With God on Our Side" manages to voice political savvy mixed with generational naiveté" as it "draws the line for those born long enough after World War I to find its issues blurry ('the reasons for fightin'/I never did get') and who view the forgiveness of the World War II Germans as a farce."

Dylan follows "With God on Our Side" with a soft, understated ballad: "One Too Many Mornings". "It's the sound of someone too smitten by love to harbor regrets, grown too independent to consider a reunion," writes Riley. One of the more celebrated songs on The Times They Are a-Changin', Dylan would dramatically rearrange it on his legendary 1966 concert tour for a full electric band.

"North Country Blues" tells the story of a mining company's decision to outsource its operations to countries where labor costs are cheaper than in the U.S.A. ("It's much cheaper down in the South American towns/Where the miners work almost for nothing".) The song marks the first time Dylan wrote a narrative from the point of view of a woman: the ex-wife of a miner whose work has disappeared. This song has been described by many critics as Dylan's portrait of his hometown, Hibbing, Minnesota.

Dylan first performed "Only a Pawn in Their Game" at a voter registration rally in Greenwood, Mississippi. The song refers to the murder of Medgar Evers, who was the Mississippi leader of the NAACP. Civil rights activist Bernice Johnson would later tell critic Robert Shelton that "'Pawn' was the very first song that showed the poor white was as victimized by discrimination as the poor black. The Greenwood people didn't know that Pete [Seeger], Theo[dore Bikel] and Bobby [Dylan] were well known. (Seeger and Bikel were also present at the registration rally.) They were just happy to be getting support. But they really like Dylan down there in the cotton country."

The melody for "Boots of Spanish Leather" was inspired by Martin Carthy's arrangement of the English folk song "Scarborough Fair" (also the melody of an earlier Dylan composition, "Girl from the North Country"). Dylan learned Carthy's arrangement during his first trip to England in late 1962. After finishing his obligations in England (including a brief appearance in a BBC drama, Madhouse on Castle Street), Dylan traveled to Italy looking for his girlfriend, Suze Rotolo, apparently unaware that she had already returned to America (reportedly the same time Dylan left for England). While in Italy, Dylan created an early draft of "Boots of Spanish Leather". Salon.com critic Bill Wyman called the song "an abstract classic and one of the purest, most confounding folk songs of the time".

According to Dylan biographer Clinton Heylin, "When the Ship Comes In" was written in August 1963 "in a fit of pique, in a hotel room, after his unkempt appearance had led an impertinent hotel clerk to refuse him admission until his companion, Joan Baez, had vouched for his good character." Heylin speculates that "Jenny's Song" from Brecht and Weill's Threepenny Opera was also an inspiration: "As Pirate Jenny dreams of the destruction of all her enemies by a mysterious ship, so Dylan envisages the neophobes being swept aside in 'the hour when the ship comes in'." Dylan's former girlfriend Suze Rotolo recalls that her "interest in Brecht was certainly an influence on him. I was working for the Circle in the Square Theatre and he came to listen all the time. He was very affected by the song that Lotte Lenya's known for, 'Pirate Jenny'."

"The Lonesome Death of Hattie Carroll" tells the story of a hotel barmaid who died after being struck by a wealthy white man. The song was inspired by Dylan's reading a newspaper account of the incident which took place in a hotel in Maryland, in February 1963.

The closing song of the album, "Restless Farewell" takes its melody from the traditional Irish-Scots song "The Parting Glass". Dylan's lyrics have an edge due to the way that Newsweek had treated Dylan. In a profile of the singer, published in October 1963, Dylan was portrayed as someone who had lied about his middle-class origins. Furthermore, it was implied that Dylan had plagiarised the lyrics of his best-known composition, "Blowin' in the Wind". Stung by these untrue allegations, Dylan composed a song about the pain of having "the dust of rumor" flung in his eyes. He swiftly recorded the work a few days after the Newsweek profile appeared on October 31, 1963. The album ends with Dylan's vow "I'll make my stand/ And remain as I am/ And bid farewell and not give a damn".

== Outtakes ==
The sessions for The Times They Are a-Changin' produced a large surplus of songs, many of which were eventually issued on later compilations. According to Clinton Heylin, "perhaps the two best songs, 'Percy's Song' and 'Lay Down Your Weary Tune', would not make the final album, failing to fit within the narrow bounds Dylan had decided to impose on himself."

"'Lay Down Your Weary Tune' [...] along with 'Eternal Circle' [...] marked a new phase in Dylan's songwriting", writes Heylin. "It is the all-important link between the clipped symbolism of 'A Hard Rain's a-Gonna Fall' and the more self-conscious efforts to come the following year. A celebration of song itself, 'Lay Down Your Weary Tune' was also an admission that there were certain songs 'no voice can hope to hum'."

Riley describes "Lay Down Your Weary Tune" as "a hymn to music's instrumental spectrum [...] it's about the heightened awareness of nature and reality available to performer and listener in the course of a highly charged musical experience". The song is also rich in natural imagery, often in surreal, musical terms ("The cryin' rain like a trumpet sang/And asked for no applause"). Steven Goldberg writes that the song depicts nature "not as a manifestation of God but as containing God within its every aspect". The Byrds released their own celebrated version of "Lay Down Your Weary Tune" in 1965 on their critically acclaimed second album, Turn! Turn! Turn!

"Percy's Song" is sung from the point of view of a man who visits a judge in a futile, last-ditch attempt to save his friend from a severe prison sentence. It is based on a tune taken from "The Wind and the Rain", a song introduced to Dylan by Paul Clayton. "'Percy's Song', along with [...] 'Seven Curses' and 'Moonshine Blues', showed that Dylan's command of traditional themes, housed in traditional melodies, remained undiminished by the topicality of other efforts", writes Heylin. Fairport Convention recorded their own celebrated rendition of "Percy's Song" on their critically acclaimed third album, Unhalfbricking.

Written sometime in late 1962 or early 1963, "Only a Hobo" was also recorded during these sessions but ultimately set aside. Described by Heylin as "a superior reworking of [Dylan's earlier composition] 'Man on the Street' that took as its source the 'Poor Miner's Lament'", the song is sung from the point of view of a sympathetic narrator who stumbles upon a homeless man lying dead in a gutter. Rod Stewart later released his own celebrated version of "Only a Hobo" on the critically acclaimed Gasoline Alley in 1970. Dylan himself re-recorded "Only a Hobo" for Bob Dylan's Greatest Hits Vol. II, only to reject that version as well. He eventually released his own version in 1991 on The Bootleg Series Volumes 1–3 (Rare & Unreleased) 1961–1991.

Dylan also recorded demo versions for publishing purposes of several songs on the album. The demos, recorded for his first two publishing companies, Leeds Music and M. Witmark & Sons, were available for many years as bootlegs and were officially released by Columbia Records in October 2010 on The Bootleg Series Vol. 9 – The Witmark Demos: 1962–1964.

== Legacy ==
On October 26, 1963, three days after recording the final song for The Times They Are a-Changin', Dylan held a concert at New York's Carnegie Hall. That night, he performed eight songs from his forthcoming third album, as well as several outtakes from the same album sessions (including "Percy's Song", "Seven Curses", and "Lay Down Your Weary Tune"). Columbia recorded the entire concert, however the recording would not see release in its entirety until the Deluxe Edition of The Bootleg Series Vol. 18: Through the Open Window 1956–1963. Nevertheless, the performance was well received by the press and audience alike.

A month later, on November 22, 1963, President John F. Kennedy was assassinated in Dallas, Texas. Dylan's friend Bob Fass was sitting with Dylan in Carla Rotolo's apartment the day of the shooting. According to Fass, Dylan was deeply affected by it and said: "What it means is that they are trying to tell you 'Don't even hope to change things'."

Three weeks to the day after Kennedy's assassination, the Emergency Civil Liberties Committee gave Dylan their annual Tom Paine Award for his contribution to the civil rights movement. Dylan gave an acceptance speech at the awards ceremony held at Hotel Americana in New York. In his closing remarks, he stated the following:

I want to accept this award, the Tom Paine Award, from the Emergency Civil Liberties Committee. I want to accept it in my name but I'm not really accepting it in my name and I'm not accepting it in any kind of group's name, any Negro group or any other kind of group. There are Negroes—I was on the march on Washington up on the platform and I looked around at all the Negroes there and I didn't see any Negroes that looked like none of my friends. My friends don't wear suits. My friends don't have to wear suits. My friends don't have to wear any kind of thing to prove that they're respectable Negroes. My friends are my friends, and they're kind, gentle people if they're my friends. And I'm not going to try to push nothing over.

So, I accept this reward—not reward, [laughter] award in behalf of Phillip Luce who led the group to Cuba which all people should go down to Cuba. I don't see why anybody can't go to Cuba. I don't see what's going to hurt by going any place. I don't know what's going to hurt anybody's eyes to see anything. On the other hand, Phillip is a friend of mine who went to Cuba.

I'll stand up and to get uncompromisable about it, which I have to be to be honest, I just got to be, as I got to admit that the man who shot President Kennedy, Lee Oswald, I don't know exactly where—what he thought he was doing, but I got to admit honestly that I too—I saw some of myself in him. I don't think it would have gone—I don't think it could go that far. But I got to stand up and say I saw things that he felt, in me—not to go that far and shoot. [Boos and hisses] You can boo but booing's got nothing to do with it. It's a—I just a—I've got to tell you, man, it's Bill of Rights is free speech and I just want to admit that I accept this Tom Paine Award in behalf of James Forman of the Students Non-Violent Coordinating Committee and on behalf of the people who went to Cuba." [Followed by applause and boos]

Professional ratings
Review scores
Source	Rating
AllMusic	4.5/5 stars
Encyclopedia of Popular Music	4/5 stars
Entertainment Weekly	B
Little Sandy Review	3/5
MusicHound Rock	4/5
Record Mirror	3/5 stars
The Rolling Stone Album Guide	4/5 stars
Tom Hull	B+

It was voted number 378 in the third edition of Colin Larkin's All Time Top 1000 Albums (2000).

Clinton Heylin wrote: "in less than six months [Dylan] had turned full circle from the protest singer who baited Paul Nelson into someone determined to write only songs that 'speak for me' [...] Dylan's ambitions as a writer for the page [...] may have been further fed at the end of December when he met renowned beat poet Allen Ginsberg, author of Howl and Kaddish." Dylan was already familiar with Ginsberg's work. By now, beat poetry and French symbolists had become an enormous influence on Dylan's work, as Dylan "passed from immediate folk sources to a polychrome of literary styles". In an interview taken in 1985, Dylan said that he did not start writing poetry until he was out of high school: "I was eighteen or so when I discovered Ginsberg, Gary Snyder, Philip Whalen, Frank O'Hara and those guys. Then I went back and started reading the French guys, Rimbaud and François Villon."

Many critics took note of the stark pessimism on The Times They Are a-Changin', which NPR's Tim Riley later described as "'Masters of War' stretched out into a concept album" due to its "social preening and black-and-white moralism".

By the time the album was released in February 1964, Dylan was already entering a new phase in his career, pulling further away from his popular image as a protest singer.

The album was re-released in 2010 with new liner notes by Greil Marcus.

== In popular culture ==
In 1994, Dylan licensed "The Times They Are a-Changin'" to be used in an advertisement for the auditing and accountancy firm Coopers & Lybrand, as performed by Richie Havens. Two years later, in 1996, a version of the song by Pete Seeger was used in a TV advertisement for the Bank of Montreal. This song was also used as the background track to the opening montage in the movie Watchmen.

The album and the song are mentioned in writer Walter Isaacson's biography of Steve Jobs, as works of Dylan that were particularly meaningful to Jobs, the song is also referenced in the 2015 film Steve Jobs, where Jobs and John Sculley debate what lyrics of the song to use in the unveiling of the Macintosh.

== Track listing ==
All tracks are written by Bob Dylan. The melody of "Restless Farewell" is from the traditional Irish-Scots song "The Parting Glass". The melody of "With God on Our Side" resembles the traditional Irish folk song "The Merry Month of May".

Side one
No.	Title	Recorded	Length
1.	"The Times They Are a-Changin'"	October 24, 1963	3:15
2.	"Ballad of Hollis Brown"	August 7, 1963	5:06
3.	"With God on Our Side"	August 7, 1963	7:08
4.	"One Too Many Mornings"	October 24, 1963	2:41
5.	"North Country Blues"	August 6, 1963	4:35
Total length:			22:45

Side two
No.	Title	Recorded	Length
1.	"Only a Pawn in Their Game"	August 7, 1963	3:33
2.	"Boots of Spanish Leather"	August 7, 1963	4:40
3.	"When the Ship Comes In"	October 23, 1963	3:18
4.	"The Lonesome Death of Hattie Carroll"	October 23, 1963	5:48
5.	"Restless Farewell"	October 31, 1963	5:32
Total length:			22:51

== Personnel ==
- Bob Dylan – vocals, acoustic guitar, harmonica
- Tom Wilson – production

== Charts ==
=== Weekly charts ===
Chart (1964–1965)	Peak position
US Billboard 200	20
UK Albums (Official Charts)	4

=== Singles ===
Year	Single	Peak positions
Year	Single	UK
1965	"The Times They Are a-Changin'"	9

== Certifications ==
Region	Certification	Certified units/sales
United Kingdom (BPI) 2005 release	Gold	100,000^{^}
United States (RIAA)	Gold	500,000^{^}
^{^} Shipments figures based on certification alone.

== Sources ==
- Cott, Jonathan, ed. (2006). Dylan on Dylan: The Essential Interviews. London: Hodder & Stoughton. ISBN 0-340-92312-1.
- Gill, Andy (1998). Classic Bob Dylan 1962–69: My Back Pages. London: Carlton. ISBN 1-85868-599-0.
- Gray, Michael (2006). The Bob Dylan Encyclopedia. Continuum International. ISBN 0-8264-6933-7.
- Heylin, Clinton (2001). Bob Dylan: Behind the Shades Revisited. New York: HarperCollins. ISBN 0-688-16593-1.
- Riley, Tim (1992). Hard Rain: A Dylan Commentary. New York: Knopf. ISBN 0-306-80907-9.
