= Stirrup cup =

British parting gift to guests

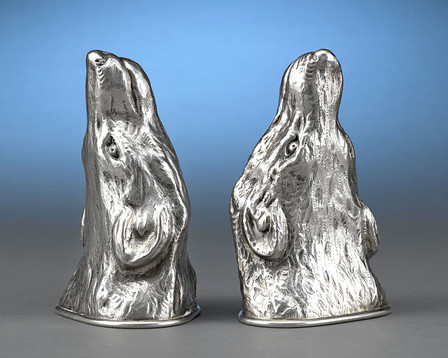
Scottish silver stirrup cups, Hallmarked Edinburgh, 1917

A stirrup cup is a "parting cup" given to guests, especially when they are leaving and have their feet in the stirrups. It is also the traditional drink (usually port or sherry) served at the meet, prior to a traditional foxhunt. The term can describe the cup that such a drink is served in.

In Scots the host may well, in inviting his guest to stay briefly for that farewell drink, call it a dochan doris (from Scottish Gaelic deoch an dorais [ˈtʲɔx ən̪ˠ ˈt̪ɔɾɪʃ], literally "drink of the door").

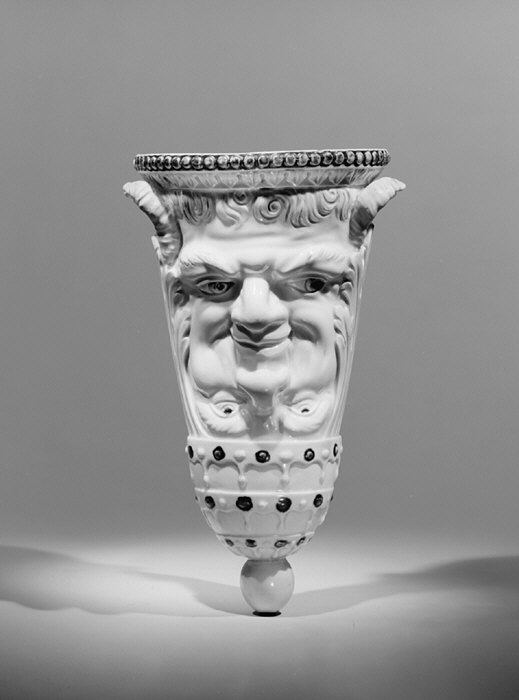
A lead-glazed earthenware stirrup cup manufactured in Burslem, Staffordshire, c. 1780

In Anya Seton's Katherine the custom occurs frequently before English royalty and nobility leave on travels abroad or progresses. In G.G. Coulton's Chaucer and his England it is referred to in relation to the Canterbury pilgrims setting out. It is also used in a number of Rosemary Sutcliff's historical novels set in England after the Norman Invasion.

The vessel is mentioned in the poem "The Stirrup-Cup" by the nineteenth-century American poet, Sidney Lanier, in the traditional Scottish song "The Parting Glass", and in the poem "In my Dreams" by Stevie Smith.

== See also ==
- Nightcap (drink)
