= The Parting Glass =

Scottish traditional song

Song
- Genre: Traditional folk

"The Parting Glass" (Roud 3004) is a Scottish traditional song, often sung at the end of a gathering of friends. It has also long been popular in Ireland, and modern versions reflect strong Irish and North American influences. It was the most popular parting song sung in Scotland before Robert Burns wrote "Auld Lang Syne".

== Text ==
Exact lyrics vary between modern arrangements, but they include most, if not all, of the following stanzas appearing in different orders:

Of all the money that e'er I had
I spent it in good company
And all the harm I've ever done
Alas it was to none but me
And all I've done for want of wit
To mem'ry now I can't recall
So fill to me the parting glass
Good night and joy be to you all

So fill to me the parting glass
And drink a health whate'er befall,
And gently rise and softly call
Good night and joy be to you all

Of all the comrades that e'er I had
They're sorry for my going away
And all the sweethearts that e'er I had
They'd wish me one more day to stay
But since it falls unto my lot
That I should rise and you should not
I gently rise and softly call
Good night and joy be to you all

If I had money enough to spend
And leisure time to sit awhile
There is a fair maid in this town
That sorely has my heart beguiled.
Her rosy cheeks and ruby lips
I own she has my heart in thrall
Then fill to me the parting glass
Good night and joy be with you all.

A man may drink and not be drunk
A man may fight and not be slain
A man may court a pretty girl
And perhaps be welcomed back again
But since it has so ought to be
By a time to rise and a time to fall
Come fill to me the parting glass
Good night and joy be with you all
Good night and joy be with you all

== History ==
=== Referent ===
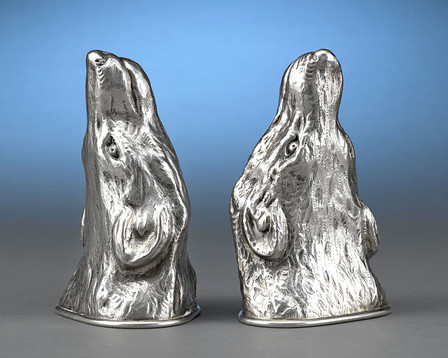
Scottish silver stirrup cups, Hallmarked Edinburgh, 1917

The "parting glass", or "stirrup cup", was the final hospitality offered to a departing guest. Once they had mounted, they were presented one final drink to fortify them for their travels. The custom was practised in several continental countries.

=== Text ===
The earliest tentative evidence for the existence of the text is from the Skene Manuscript, a collection of Scottish airs written in tablature for the lute and mandora at various dates between 1615 and 1635, as a different (though distantly-related) tune bearing the name Good Night, and God Be With Yow. The tune appeared to have been popular and variants of it appear in many collections, often with similar names, including in Henry Playford's 1700 A collection of original Scotch-tunes, Neil Gow's The complete repository of original Scots slow strathspeys and dances.

The first complete text that bears resemblance to the Parting Glass first appears on a broadside published in 1654 (or circa 1670 according to another dating) called Neighbours farewel to his friends:

Now come is my departing time,
And here I may no longer stay,
There is no kind comrade of mine
But will desire I were away.
But if that time will me permit,
Which from your Company doth call,
And me inforceth for to flit,
Good Night, and GOD be with you all.

For here I grant some time I spent
In loving kind good Company;
For all offences I repent,
And wisheth now forgiven to be;
What I have done, for want of wit,
To Memory I'll not recall:
I hope you are my Friends as yet
Good Night, and GOD be with you all.

In 1776 untitled fragment, which appears to be a relic of the longer song, appears in David Herd's Ancient And Modern Scottish Songs, Vol. 2:

O this is my departing time!
For here nae langer maun I stay:
There's not a friend or foe of mine
But wishes that I were away.

What I hae done for lack o' wit,
I never, never can recall!
I hope you a' my friends as yet:
Good-night and joy be wi' you all.

A similar fragment later appears in Walter Scott's Minstrelsy of the Scottish Border as Armstrong's Goodnight. According to Scott, it is said to have been written by one of the Border Reivers executed for the murder in 1600 of Sir John Carmichael, Warden of the Scottish West March. However, Scott does not vouch for the authenticity of the story, and it appears to be first published by him, later repeated and embellished by other sources.

More important for the development of the song as we know it today was another text that appears in a Scottish chapbook from ca. 1815-1822 printed by Thomas Duncan in Glasgow. Here included are verses 1, 2 and 4, which are similar to modern variants:

All the money e'er I had,
I spent it in good company,
All the hardships e'er I had,
Alas they were to none but me.
From what I've done for want of wit;
My memory I will recal,
I hope to mend it all as yet,
Good night and joy be with you all.

If I had money for to spend,
And time and place to sit awhile,
There is a fair maid in this town,
So fain I would her heart beguile.
Her cherry cheeks, her ruby lips,
alas! she has my heart withal;
Come, give me the parting kiss,
Good night and joy be with you all.

...

But now the time is drawing near,
when here no longer I can stay,
There was ne'er a comrade ever I had,
But was sorry at my going away.
But since it's happened so with me,
That you're to rise and I'm to fall,
Come give me the parting glass,
Good night and joy be with you all.

This variant later appeared to have migrated to Ireland and appears on a broadside published by J. & H. Baird in Cork: "Good Night And Joy Be with you all. A New Song" (Madden Ballads 12, Frame 8341). The exact date of publication is not known but the Bairds were active as printers in Cork during the 1830s. However, a more recognizable variety was also published in Dublin as A New Song caled the Parting Glass by W. Birmingham at least a decade later in the 1840's or perhaps even in the 1850's. The first three verses appear in modern variants almost verbatim, but the final, which is not included here, is usually replaced by "A man may drink and not be drunk...".:

All the money that e'er I had,
I spent it in good company.
And all the harm ever I done,
Alas! it was to none but me,
And all I have done for the want of wit,
To memory now I can't recall,
So fill to me the parting glass,
Good night and joy be with you all.

Chorus:
Be with you all, be with you all
Good night and joy be with you all
So fill to me the parting glass,
Good night and joy be with you all.

All the comrades that e'er I had,
They're sorry for my going away,
All the sweethearts e'er I had,
They'd wish me one day more to stay,
But since it came unto me lot,
That I should rise and you should not,
I gently rise and with a smile,
Good night and joy be with you all.

If I had money enough to spend,
And leisure time to sit awhile,
There a fair maid in this town
That sorely has my heart beguiled,
Her rosy cheeks and ruby lips,
I own she has my heart enthralled;
Then fill to me the parting glass,
Good night and joy be with you all.

=== Tune ===
The earliest known appearance of a tune that closely resembles the one now associated with this text is a fiddle tune called "The Peacock", printed in Volume 2 of James Aird's A Selection of Scots, English, Irish and Foreign Airs in 1782.

In 1787, Robert Burns gives the name of the air "Good night, and joy be wi' ye a'" to be used for his Masonic lyric "The Farewell. To the brethren of St. James's Lodge, Tarbolton". However, this appears to refer to the 17th century melody mentioned above, which was also published in 1803 with Burns' lyrics, to conclude Volume 6 of James Johnson's Scots Musical Museum. The older melody was also arranged for voice and piano trio by Joseph Haydn and published in 1805, to conclude Book 4 of George Thomson's Collection of Scottish Airs. Here it was titled "Good night and joy be wi' ye" (Hob.XXXIa:254), and set to a new text by Sir Alexander Boswell (1775–1822).

The tune is also related to the English folksong "Just as the tide was flowing", which places it in a tune family that includes "The Mill, Mill Oh", "The Deadly Wars", and "The Blue-Eyed Stranger".

Patrick Weston Joyce, in his Old Irish Folk Music and Songs (1909), gives a version of the tune with a different text under the name "Sweet Cootehill Town," noting, "The air seems to have been used indeed as a general farewell tune, so that—from the words of another song of the same class—it is often called 'Good night and joy be with you all.'" The celebrated Irish folk song collector Colm Ó Lochlainn has taken note of this identity of melodies between "The Parting Glass" and "Sweet Cootehill Town". "Sweet Cootehill Town" is another traditional farewell song, this time involving a man leaving Ireland to go to America.

Other versions of the tune appeared, with sacred lyrics, in 19th century American tunebooks. "Shouting Hymn" in Jeremiah Ingalls's Christian Harmony (1805) is a related tune. The tune achieved wider currency among shape note singers with its publication, associated with a text first known in the 1814 Collection of Hymns and Spiritual Songs, "Come Now Ye Lovely Social Band", in William Walker's Southern Harmony (1835), and in The Sacred Harp (1844), with the first phrase as "Say, now ye lovely social band". This form of the song is still widely sung by Sacred Harp singers under the title "Clamanda".

=== Irish and North American influence ===
Dr Lori Watson, a lecturer in Scottish Ethnology at the University of Edinburgh states that it's difficult to fully trace the origins of many traditional songs: Although it currently seems that Scotland has evidence of the earliest published melody and several song variants, the popular Parting Glass currently in circulation has strong Irish and North American influences to thank.

=== Modern adaptations ===
"The Parting Glass" was re-introduced to mid-20th century audiences by the recordings and performances of The Clancy Brothers and Tommy Makem. Their rendition featured a solo vocal by youngest brother Liam and first appeared on their 1959 Tradition Records LP Come Fill Your Glass with Us as well as on a number of subsequent recordings, including the group's high-charting live performance album, In Person at Carnegie Hall. The rendition by the Clancys and Makem has been described as "by all accounts... the most influential" of the many recorded versions.

The song "Restless Farewell", written by Bob Dylan and featured on The Times They Are a-Changin' from 1964, uses the melody of the nineteenth century versions of "The Parting Glass" with Dylan's original lyrics. Dylan had learned the tune from the singing of the Clancys and Makem.

In 1998, the traditional words were set to a new, different melody by Irish composer Shaun Davey. His version, sung by Liam O'Maonlaí, appears in the film Waking Ned Devine. It has also been attributed to Liam O'Maonlaí and The Voice Squad with piper John McSherry In 2002, he orchestrated this version for orchestra, choir, pipes, fiddle, and percussion to commemorate the opening of the Helix Concert Hall, Dublin, Ireland. This version was recorded in 2006 with Seamus Begley (lead vocal), Liam O'Flynn (uilleann pipes), Nollaig Casey (fiddle), Noel Eccles (percussion), and the Irish NSO and released on the CD "May we never have to say goodbye" that year.

At the request of Margaret Atwood, to end her guest-edited edition of BBC Radio 4's Today programme with the song, a version by singer Karine Polwart and pianist Dave Milligan was commissioned.

The song was featured in the conclusion of the 2013 video game Assassin's Creed IV: Black Flag, where pirate Anne Bonny sings the song to protagonist Edward Kenway after the two say their farewells and Edward prepares to meet his daughter and return with her to England.

In 2023, boygenius collaborated with Ye Vagabonds to release a cover of "The Parting Glass", paying tribute to the late Sinéad O'Connor, an Irish singer and activist who had also recorded the song and who had died earlier that year. All proceeds were donated to the Aisling Project, Sinéad O'Connor Estate's charity of choice.
