= North Country Blues =

Song by Bob Dylan

from the album The Times They Are a-Changin'
- Released: January 13, 1964
- Recorded: August 6, 1963
- Genre: Folk
- Length: 4:35
- Label: Columbia
- Songwriter: Bob Dylan
- Producer: Tom Wilson

"North Country Blues" is a song by Bob Dylan, released on his third studio album The Times They Are a-Changin' in 1964. He also performed it at the 1963 Newport Folk Festival.

Its apparently simple format (ten verses of ABCB rhyme scheme), accompanied by only two chords (Cm & Bb) and subject matter (the perils of life in a mining community and its ultimate demise) appears to have been influenced by Woody Guthrie.

== Background ==
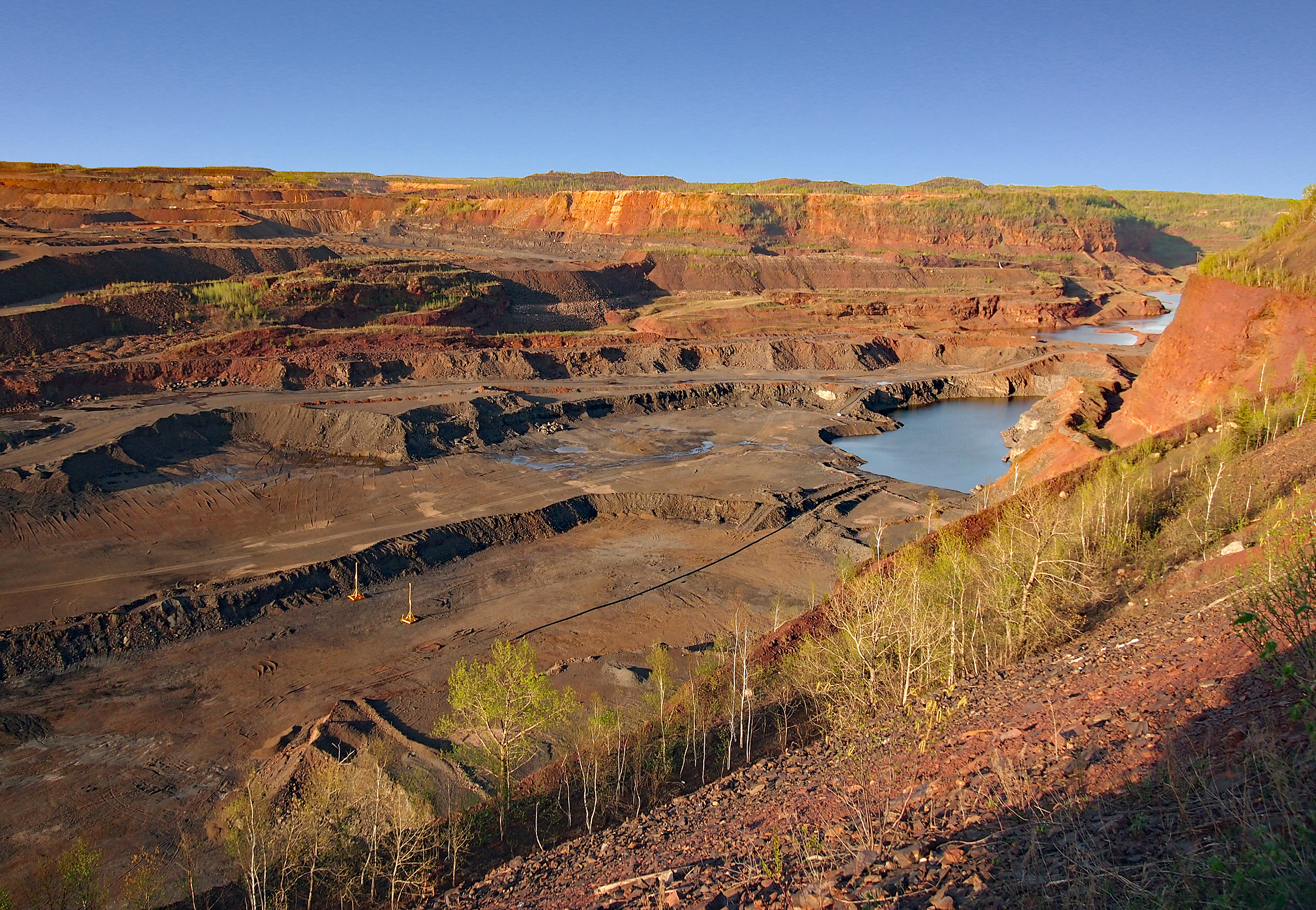
The Hull–Rust–Mahoning Open Pit Iron Mine in Dylan's hometown of Hibbing, Minnesota may have influenced "North Country Blues".

The specific location of the town is never stated. Daniel Epstein recalled hearing Dylan introduce the song, in a performance in Washington D.C. in 1963, with the note that it was about the mining towns of Virginia. However, the title and references to "iron ore", "red iron", and "red iron pits" strongly suggests the location is on the Mesabi Range, a portion of the Iron Range where open-pit mining has predominated, and where Dylan's childhood residence in Hibbing, Minnesota is situated. Virginia, Minnesota is a town near Hibbing, that, along with Hibbing is also part of the Mesabi Iron Range, has shared boom and bust cycles due to changes in the mining industry, and may be the town that Dylan was talking about in the Washington concert.

== Lyrics ==
The song opens with a deliberately conventional opening (Come gather round friends and I'll tell you a tale...). However, the darkness of the tale soon becomes apparent. Each verse contains at least one tragic situation or event:

1. Speaking of the current day, "the whole town is empty."
2. When the narrator was young, her mother "took sick" and obviously died, as she was "brought up by my brother."
3. One day her brother "failed to come home, the same as my father before him." (The implication is that they failed to come home from the mine, suggesting repeated mining tragedies.)
4. Her schooling was cut short "to marry John Thomas, a miner." (Dylan hides the fact that the narrator is a woman to the end of verse four.)
5. With three children, her husband's work was cut to a half-day shift "with no reason."
6. "The man" came to town and announced that mine #11 was closing.
7. The price of the mined ore is too high and not worth digging, because it's cheaper from South America where miners work "almost for nothing."
8. Total desolation, her husband is drinking heavily and the hours last "twice as long . . . as I waited for the sun to go sinking."
9. Her husband has started talking to himself, then one morning she wakes up to find him gone, leaving her "alone with three children."
10. The stores have all closed and her children "will go, as soon as they grow," because "there ain't nothing here now to hold them."

Dylan hides the fact that the narrator is a woman to the end of verse four. The song ends bleakly, as by this time the woman has lost her husband, mother, father and brother; the mine is closed and the town is virtually abandoned; and soon her children will leave her in complete isolation and desolation.

According to writer M. Marqusee, this apparently restricting and morose format, referred to as a "formally conservative exercise in first-person narrative", Dylan manages to achieve significant tonal and expressive variation.

== Cover versions ==
In 1968, Joan Baez included a performance of "North Country Blues" on her Dylan tribute album Any Day Now. The song also appears on the self-titled 2023 album of bluegrass group Mighty Poplar. British singer Martin Simpson covers the song on his 2013 album "Vagrant Stanzas".

== See also ==
- Iron Range
