= Restless Farewell =

Song by Bob Dylan

from the album The Times They Are a-Changin'
- Released: January 13, 1964
- Recorded: October 31, 1963
- Genre: Folk
- Length: 5:32
- Label: Columbia
- Songwriter: Bob Dylan
- Producer: Tom Wilson

"Restless Farewell" is a song by Bob Dylan, released as the final track on his third studio album The Times They Are a-Changin' in 1964. Dylan’s song is based on the Scottish/Irish folk song "The Parting Glass."

== Background ==
Dylan composed the song “Restless Farewell” in October 1963, basing its tune and sentiments on “The Parting Glass”, a song he had learnt from Irish musicians The Clancy Brothers who were friends of Dylan in the Greenwich Village folk scene of the early 1960s. (Note: Musicologist Todd Harvey writes: “The Parting Glass” appears to have come to America with The Clancy Brothers. No printed American songbooks or recordings mention it before their emigration.”(Harvey, 2001 The Formative Bob Dylan, pp. 94–95.))

The event that triggered the composition of the song was an interview Dylan gave to a Newsweek journalist, Andrea Svedberg, on October 23, 1963. Svedberg pressed Dylan on the autobiographical tales he had spun to friends and journalists since arriving in New York in January 1961. In the interview, Dylan denied his name was Robert Zimmerman and told Svedberg: "I don't know my parents. They don't know me. I've lost contact with them for years." In fact, Svedberg’s article revealed that Dylan’s parents were in New York to attend his concert at Carnegie Hall later that week. Svedberg’s article also repeated the false rumor that Dylan was not the true author of "Blowin' in the Wind" and the song had been composed by a New Jersey high school student.

The Newsweek article reached the news stands on October 29, though it carried the date November 4 on its cover. As biographer Clinton Heylin puts it, “Dylan’s response was fast, furious and unsparing.” He rapidly composed the song "Restless Farewell" and booked a CBS studio for the next day, October 31, to record it. According to Heylin, Dylan’s unfamiliarity with the tune and the lyrics meant that he needed nine takes to achieve the recording used on the album.

Dylan expressed his distaste for the Newsweek type of journalism in 11 outlined epitaphs, the sleeve notes he wrote for the album The Times They Are a-Changin': “I do not care t’ be made an oddball/ bouncin’ past reporters’ pens/ cooperatin’ with questions/ aimed at eyes that want t’ see/ ‘there’s nothin’ here/ go back t’ sleep/ or look at the ads/ on page 33.’” According to Robert Shelton, the Newsweek interview caused Dylan to withdraw from public life for three weeks, and "resulted in him breaking off nearly all contact with his parents for years… Dylan turned from an accessible subject into a cagey game-player who toyed with interview questions, who developed the "anti-interview" saying shocking things he often didn’t believe."

== Critical comments on the song ==
Heylin writes the original title of the song was “Bob Dylan’s Restless Epitaph” and so makes plain "this is one instance where narrator and writer are one and the same". Heylin calls the song “a memorable declaration of independence from ‘unknowin eyes’, signalling a desire to write only ‘for myself’. Never again would he knowingly expose himself to anyone looking to bury him in ‘the dust of rumors’.”

For Gill, Dylan uses the song to summarise all the misgivings he feels about the direction of his life, his work and his career, which, in this song, brim over "into a wistful adieu to his former friends and foes". Shelton points out that Dylan makes time the theme of his song, but contrasts its meaning with its use in the album title. "The singer realises that his times are also changing: "Oh a false clock tries to tick out my time/ To disgrace, distract, and bother me/ And the dirt of gossip blows into my face/ And the dust of rumors covers me”. For Shelton, the album was proof that Dylan was “growing beyond anyone’s command, choosing his own lonely road to travel“ and Shelton applauds what he calls “the confident conclusion” of the final song: “So I’ll make my stand/ And remain as I am/ And bid farewell and not give a damn”.

Harvey contrasts Dylan’s composition with the sentiments of the song it is based on, “The Parting Glass”. The “Irish song about leaving loves, leaving home, leaving Ireland”, becomes, in Dylan’s hands, “a song about leaving one’s current identity”. For Harvey, Dylan deliberately reinvented the song because he was “a folk revivalist, outside of a tradition looking in”. The Clancy Brothers “could transmit the emotion of parting, but Dylan could never be an Irishman leaving home”.

== Notable performances ==
In 1995, Dylan performed the song live as part of the Sinatra: 80 Years My Way television special, celebrating entertainer Frank Sinatra's 80th birthday, at the request of Sinatra himself. It was the only performance in the special of a song that Sinatra had not recorded.

In 1968, Joan Baez covered it on her all-Dylan double album, Any Day Now.

De Dannan recorded it on their 1991 release Half Set in Harlem.

Robbie O'Connell performed the song as a member of Clancy, O'Connell, and Clancy on their 1997 self-titled album.

On the 2012 compilation album Chimes of Freedom: The Songs of Bob Dylan Honoring 50 Years of Amnesty International, the song was covered by Mark Knopfler.

== See also ==
List of Bob Dylan songs based on earlier tunes
