= Mixed-Up Confusion =

1962 single by Bob Dylan

Single by Bob Dylan
- B-side: "Corrina, Corrina"
- Released: December 14, 1962
- Recorded: November 14, 1962
- Studio: Columbia Recording Studios, New York City
- Genre: Folk rock
- Length: 2:28
- Label: Columbia
- Songwriter: Bob Dylan
- Producer: John H. Hammond

Bob Dylan singles chronology
"Mixed-Up Confusion" (1962)	"Blowin' in the Wind" (1963)

"Mixed-Up Confusion" is a song written and recorded by Bob Dylan and released as his first single.

The song was recorded with an electric band on November 14, 1962, during the sessions for The Freewheelin' Bob Dylan but was not used on that album, which, aside from "Corrina, Corrina", was entirely acoustic. Instead the song, backed with "Corrina, Corrina" (a different take from the Freewheelin' one, still exclusive to this single), a traditional blues song, appeared as Dylan's first single, released in the United States on December 14, 1962, as Columbia 4-42656. According to legend, Dylan wrote the song in a cab on the way to the Columbia studios for the recording session.

A different version of the song, recorded on November 1, 1962, with later overdubbing, was released on the compilation album Masterpieces in 1978 and on the original 1985 issue of the Biograph box set; the 1997 reissue of Biograph includes a stereo version of the released single, recorded on November 14, 1962, in place of this alternative version. Olof Björner's website lists all the different takes of this song, recorded by Dylan in October and November 1962.

== Personnel ==
- Bob Dylan – vocal, guitar, harmonica
- George Barnes – guitar
- Bruce Langhorne – guitar
- Dick Wellstood – piano
- Gene Ramey – bass
- Herb Lovelle – drums
