= Masters of War =

1963 song by Bob Dylan

Song by Bob Dylan

from the album The Freewheelin' Bob Dylan
- Released: May 27, 1963
- Recorded: April 24, 1963
- Genre: Folk
- Length: 4:34
- Label: Columbia
- Composer: Traditional/Jean Ritchie
- Lyricist: Bob Dylan
- Producer: John H. Hammond

"Masters of War" is a song by Bob Dylan, written over the winter of 1962–63 and released on the album The Freewheelin' Bob Dylan in the spring of 1963. The song's melody was adapted from the traditional "Nottamun Town." Dylan's lyrics are a protest against the Cold War nuclear arms build-up of the early 1960s. In 2025, Rolling Stone ranked it as the 6th greatest protest song of all time. In June 2026, CBS News included the song in its list of the 250 essential American songs of the past 250 years.

== Basis of melody ==
As with several of his early songs, Dylan adapted or "borrowed" melodies from traditional songs. In the case of "Nottamun Town," however, the arrangement was by veteran folksinger Jean Ritchie. Unknown to Dylan, the song had been in Ritchie's family for generations, and she wanted a writing credit for her arrangement. In a legal settlement, Dylan's lawyers paid Ritchie $5,000 against any further claims.

== Recordings and performances ==
Dylan first recorded "Masters of War" in January 1963 for Broadside magazine, which published the lyrics and music on the cover of its February issue. The song was also taped in the basement of Gerde's Folk City in February and for Dylan's music publisher, M. Witmark & Sons, in March. The Witmark version was included on The Bootleg Series Vol. 9 – The Witmark Demos: 1962–1964 in October 2010. The Freewheelin' version was recorded on April 24, 1963, by Columbia Records; in addition to that album, it has also appeared on compilation albums such as Masterpieces in 1978 and Biograph in 1985.

During 1963, Dylan performed the song at major concerts, including his performances at New York City's Town Hall on April 12, Brandeis University's Brandeis Folk Festival on May 10, and Carnegie Hall on October 26. He also played it at an afternoon workshop at his first Newport Folk Festival appearance on July 27. The Town Hall performance was released on The Bootleg Series Vol. 7: No Direction Home in August 2005, the Brandeis version on Live in Concert at Brandeis University 10/05/1963 in October 2010, and the Carnegie Hall version on Live 1962–1966: Rare Performances From The Copyright Collections in July 2018. A live, electric version, recorded at London's Wembley Stadium in 1984, was included on Dylan's 1985 Real Live European tour album. He performed the song during the 1991 Grammy Awards ceremony where he received a Lifetime Achievement Award. After 1963's performances, Dylan did not play an acoustic version of "Masters of War" for 30 years, until his Hiroshima concert in Japan in 1994.

American folk revival musician Pete Seeger covered the song on his 1965 album Strangers and Cousins. Recorded live in Japan, the cover features Seeger playing an acoustic guitar, with each lyric followed by a spoken translation of the lyric by a Japanese translator. Seeger and Dylan had a close personal and professional relationship, with Dylan citing Seeger as a source of inspiration in both musical and political spheres. Additionally, they both participated in anti-war activism during the '50s and '60s, and Seeger shared many of the pacifist values expressed by Dylan in “Masters of War". The choice to cover the song in Japan links back to Seeger's involvement with activism against Japanese-American internment camps. His activism led to an FBI investigation, and he was later placed on an FBI blacklist of communist entertainers. These issues also held significance in Seeger's personal life; his wife, Toshi Seeger, was the daughter of a Japanese political exile fleeing statism in Shōwa Japan.

Leon Russell's 1970 version retains Dylan's lyric but is sung to the melody of "The Star Spangled Banner."

Queen drummer Roger Taylor recorded a synth eavy arrangement for his 1984 solo release, Strange Frontier.

Hip hop group the Roots performed a 14-minute version of the song that was considered by critics to be the high point of a Dylan-tribute concert in 2007.

In October 2020, Canadian rock band Billy Talent uploaded a cover of the song to YouTube, with a message from drummer, Aaron Solowoniuk, urging American viewers to vote in the 2020 United States presidential election.

== Themes ==
In the album notes to The Freewheelin' Bob Dylan, Nat Hentoff wrote that Dylan startled himself with this song, and quotes Dylan saying: "I've never written anything like that before. I don't sing songs which hope people will die, but I couldn't help it with this one. The song is a sort of striking out... a feeling of what can you do?"

Critic Andy Gill described the song as "the bluntest condemnation in Dylan's songbook, a torrent of plain speaking pitched at a level that even the objects of its bile might understand it." Gill points out that when the song was published in Broadside magazine in February 1963, it was accompanied by drawings by Suze Rotolo, Dylan's girlfriend at the time, which depicted a man carving up the world with a knife and fork, while a hungry family forlornly looks on.

According to Todd Harvey, in this song Dylan "allows the listener no opportunity to see the issue from the masters' eyes. 'I' and 'you' are clearly established and 'you' are clearly wrong. The repetitive text and accompaniment's droning single harmony work in tandem to drive home relentlessly the singer's perspective." Harvey notes that Dylan transforms "Nottamun Town," which has absurdly nonsensical words (a naked drummer accompanies a royal procession "with his heels in his bosom") into a confrontational political song; Dylan's writing entered a new phase—harsh, and fitting with the times.

According to Dylan biographer Howard Sounes, in Sounes's 2001 book Down the Highway: The Life of Bob Dylan, Dylan once said that he wrote the song "simply because he thought it would sell", a statement which reportedly shocked his then-partner and fellow folk singer Joan Baez. Sounes suggests that, "He was probably being deliberately provocative, knowing exactly what to say to irritate Baez, but at the same time he did not write the song simply because it chimed with antiwar sentiments then in vogue."

On January 17, 1961, President Dwight D. Eisenhower gave his farewell address from the Oval Office. In this speech, he warned that "we must guard against the acquisition of unwarranted influence, whether sought or unsought, by the military-industrial complex." In an interview, published in USA Today on September 10, 2001, Dylan linked his song to Eisenhower's speech, saying:

"Masters of War"… is supposed to be a pacifistic song against war. It's not an anti-war song. It's speaking against what Eisenhower was calling a military-industrial complex as he was making his exit from the presidency. That spirit was in the air, and I picked it up.

== Other cultural references ==
- American contemporary classical composer John Corigliano set the song's lyrics to music in his 2000 song cycle Mr. Tambourine Man. Like the other six Dylan songs in the cycle, Corigliano's version is musically unrelated to the original.
- The Sage Francis song "Hey Bobby" references "Masters of War" with the lyrics "Hey Bobby, the masters are back, and they're up to no good just like the old days. They played dead when you stood over their graves, Bobby, they played dead when you stood over their graves."
- The Staple Singers' 1964 version of "Masters of War" was used as the soundtrack in the promotional trailer for Sony's Resistance 3 video game in 2010 as well as Ken Burns and Lynn Novick's 2017 documentary series, The Vietnam War.
- Timothée Chalamet, playing Bob Dylan, sings a censored version of the song (omitting the first 4 lines of the last verse) in the 2024 film A Complete Unknown.
- Grandson released a cover of the song on his 2025 album Inertia.

== See also ==
- List of Bob Dylan songs based on earlier tunes
- List of anti-war songs
