= George Jackson (song) =

- West German picture sleeve

Single by Bob Dylan
- A-side: "George Jackson (Big Band version)"
- B-side: "George Jackson (Acoustic version)"
- Released: November 12, 1971
- Recorded: November 4, 1971
- Studio: Columbia Studio B, New York City
- Genre: Rock; folk; protest song
- Length: 5:38 (Big Band version); 3:37 (Acoustic version)
- Label: Columbia
- Songwriter: Bob Dylan
- Producer: Bob Dylan

Bob Dylan discography singles chronology
"Watching the River Flow" (1971)	"George Jackson" (1971)	"Knockin' on Heaven's Door" (1973)

"George Jackson" is a song by Bob Dylan, written in 1971, in tribute to the Black Panther leader George Jackson, who had been shot and killed by guards at San Quentin Prison during an attempted escape on August 21, 1971. The event indirectly provoked the Attica Prison riot.

== Background ==
=== George Jackson ===
The Chicago-born George Jackson was convicted of armed robbery in 1961, and was punished with an indeterminate sentence in the San Quentin State Prison. It was in San Quentin that George Jackson found radical politics, and began his journey as a Black activist. Jackson, along with other politicized black inmates, began the Black Guerilla Family, and became involved with the Black Panthers after being transferred to Soledad Prison in 1969. Soledad's existing racial tension, as well as Jackson's increased criticism of the US prison system, caused problems for Jackson with white inmates and guards. In 1970, he was charged, along with two other Soledad Brothers, with the murder of prison guard John Vincent Mills in the aftermath of a prison fight. Numerous parole hearings and denied appeals culminated in an attempted prison escape, when George Jackson was killed in the prison yard by a guard from a watch tower. Jackson and other prisoners took hostages during the attempt and five hostages were found dead in Jackson's cell after the incident.

=== Composition and recording ===
Dylan recorded the song at Columbia Studio B, on November 4, 1971 and it was quickly released as a 45 rpm single, Columbia 4-45516, on November 12, 1971. The single consisted of a "Big Band version" of the song on Side A and an "Acoustic version" on Side B.

== Reception ==
=== Commercial reception ===
"George Jackson" was a Top 40 hit in the Netherlands, and on the US Billboard charts. The song debuted on the Billboard Hot 100 chart at #93 on December 4, 1971, peaking at #33, and remained on the charts for 7 weeks. The "Big Band version" was later included on the 1978 album Masterpieces, released in Japan, New Zealand, and Australia. The acoustic version was released on the 2013 Side Tracks double album, included in the box set Bob Dylan – The Complete Album Collection Vol.1 while both the "Acoustic" and "Big Band version" are included in the digital download version of the album.

=== Critical reception ===
Billboard called it "a potent piece of message material in a new Dylan bag." Cash Box said that "political Dylan is back." Record World called it "penetrating commentary" and said that "the ever-relevant Dylan, who watched the river flow for a while, jumps head first into the current."

=== Social reception ===
The song came out after a long hiatus from Dylan after his motorcycle accident. The release did cause controversy in some radio stations due to both the song's contentious subject, and the use of an explicit lyric in the third verse. Some stations opted to censor the term, while others opted not to play the song at all.

== Significance ==
Considered within the chronology of Dylan's work, the song "George Jackson" is of special significance, because, along with "When I Paint My Masterpiece" and the single "Watching the River Flow," it represents the only wholly new work to appear from Dylan in the years 1971–72, the period between the albums New Morning (1970) and Pat Garrett and Billy the Kid (1973). From the time of the appearance of his first album in 1962 until the 1990s, this was the longest period that Dylan went without releasing an album of new material (although he made several new recordings of older songs to be released for the first time in a Dylan performance on 1971's Bob Dylan's Greatest Hits Vol. II).

=== Bob Dylan political activism ===
Bob Dylan's involvement with specific civil rights groups and organizations is not clear, but his music made him a widely influential figure in the American protest movement of the 1960s, though he did not necessarily want to be associated with the label. After several albums and a traumatic motorcycle accident in 1966, Dylan took a break from the public limelight. Bob Dylan biographer Anthony Scaduto alleges that the song may have been written in part as a response to fellow musician and political activist, Joan Baez, who urged him to get back into political activism in her song "To Bobby".

== Cover versions ==
The song was recorded 33 years later by Steel Pulse on their 2004 album, African Holocaust; the album which also included an updated version of their own song 'Uncle George', which was also in tribute to George Jackson. Leon Russell played George Jackson in concert in Stockholm, Sweden on November 26, 1971 on the North Country Fair TV show. In the introduction he mentions recording it recently with Bob Dylan. Southern soul singer and songwriter J.P. Robinson released his cover on a 1972 single. Fairport Convention recorded a live version of the song in April 1973, a version that was released with the CD reissue of Nine. Joan Baez performed a live cover of "George Jackson" on May 25, 1977, in New York, NY while on tour.

== Personnel ==
Big Band version

- Bob Dylan – guitar, harmonica, vocal
- Kenneth Buttrey – drums
- Ben Keith – steel guitar
- Leon Russell – bass, piano
- Joshie Armstead – backing vocals
- Rosie Hicks – backing vocals

Acoustic version

- Bob Dylan – guitar, harmonica, vocal

== Charts ==
Chart (1971)	Peak position
Dutch Single Top 100	11
US Billboard Hot 100	33
