= The Lonesome Death of Hattie Carroll =

Song by Bob Dylan

from the album The Times They Are a-Changin'
- Released: February 10, 1964
- Recorded: October 23, 1963
- Genre: Folk
- Length: 5:48
- Label: Columbia
- Songwriter: Bob Dylan
- Producer: Tom Wilson

"The Lonesome Death of Hattie Carroll" is a protest song written by the American musician Bob Dylan. Recorded on October 23, 1963, the song was released on Dylan's 1964 album The Times They Are a-Changin' and gives a generally factual account of the killing of a 51-year-old African-American barmaid, Hattie Carroll (née Curtis; March 3, 1911 – February 9, 1963), by then 24-year-old William Devereux "Billy" Zantzinger (February 7, 1939 – January 3, 2009), a young man from a wealthy white tobacco farming family in Charles County, Maryland, and of his subsequent sentence to six months in a county jail, after being convicted of assault.

The melody of the chorus is largely taken from a folk song called "Mary Hamilton". The lyrics are a commentary on racism. When Carroll was killed in 1963, Charles County was still strictly segregated by race in public facilities such as restaurants, churches, theaters, doctor's offices, buses and the county fair. The schools of Charles County were not integrated until 1967.

== Killing ==
The main incident described in the song took place in the early hours of February 9, 1963, at the white tie Spinsters' Ball at the Emerson Hotel in Baltimore. Using a toy cane, Zantzinger drunkenly assaulted at least three of the Emerson Hotel workers: a bellboy, a waitress, and — at about 1:30 in the morning of the 9th — Carroll, a 51-year-old barmaid. According to the song, Carroll "had borne 10 children", though other accounts range from 8 to 11. (Note: In this programme a neighbour of Carroll from northwest Baltimore says she was the mother of eight children, not ten, although it is possible that only eight were alive at the time of their mother's death.) She was president of a black social club.

Already drunk before he got to the Emerson Hotel that night, the 6'2" Zantzinger had assaulted employees at Eager House, a prestigious Baltimore restaurant, with the same cane. The cane was a 25-cent toy. At the Spinsters' Ball, he called a 30-year-old waitress a "nigger" and hit her with the cane; she fled the room in tears. Moments later, after ordering a bourbon that Carroll did not bring immediately, Zantzinger cursed her, called her a "nigger", then "you black son of a bitch", and struck her on the shoulder and across the head with the cane. In the words of the court notes: "He asked for a drink and called her 'a black bitch', and 'black s.o.b'. She replied, 'Just a moment' and started to prepare his drink. After a delay of perhaps a minute, he complained about her being slow and struck her a hard blow on her shoulder about half-way between the point of her shoulder and her neck." She handed him his drink. After striking Carroll, he attacked his own wife, knocking her to the ground and hitting her with his shoe.

Within five minutes from the time of the blow, Carroll leaned heavily against the barmaid next to her and complained of feeling ill. Carroll told co-workers, "I feel deathly ill, that man has upset me so." The barmaid and another employee helped Carroll to the kitchen. Her arm became numb, her speech thick. She collapsed and was hospitalized. Carroll died eight hours after the assault. Her autopsy showed hardened arteries, an enlarged heart and high blood pressure. A spinal tap confirmed brain hemorrhage as the cause of death. She died in Mercy Hospital at 9 a.m. on February 9, 1963.

Zantzinger was initially charged with murder. His defense was that he had been extremely drunk, and he claimed to have no memory of the attack. His charge was reduced to manslaughter and assault, based on the likelihood that it was her stress reaction to his verbal and physical abuse that led to the intracranial bleeding, rather than blunt-force trauma from the blow that left no lasting mark. On August 28, Zantzinger was convicted of both charges and sentenced to six months' imprisonment. Time magazine covered the sentencing:

In June, after Zantzinger's phalanx of five topflight attorneys won a change of venue to a court in Hagerstown, a three-judge panel reduced the murder charge to manslaughter. Following a three-day trial, Zantzinger was found guilty. For the assault on the hotel employees: a fine of $125. For the death of Hattie Carroll: six months in jail and a fine of $500. The judges considerately deferred the start of the jail sentence until September 15, to give Zantzinger time to harvest his tobacco crop.

— Time "Deferred Sentence" September 6, 1963.

After the sentence was announced, the New York Herald Tribune conjectured he was given a short sentence meant to keep him out of the largely black state prison, reasoning his notoriety would make him a target for abuse there. Zantzinger served his time in the comparative safety of the Washington County county jail, some 70 miles (110 km) from the scene of the crime. In September, the Herald Tribune quoted Zantzinger on his sentence: "I'll just miss a lot of snow." His then-wife, Jane, was quoted saying, "Nobody treats his niggers as well as Billy does around here."

== Song ==
Zantzinger was convicted of manslaughter on August 28, 1963, and was not tried by a jury of peers but by a panel of three judges. The sentence was handed down on the same day that Martin Luther King Jr. delivered his "I Have a Dream" speech at the March on Washington for Jobs and Freedom. Bob Dylan, aged 22 at that time, was one of the celebrities at the march and on the journey home to New York City he read about the conviction of Zantzinger and decided to write a protest song about the case. According to a 1991 Washington Post report, Dylan wrote the song in Manhattan, sitting in an all-night cafe. A radio documentary on the song said rather that he wrote it both in New York and at the home of his then-lover, Joan Baez, in Carmel. According to Nancy Carlin, a friend of Baez who visited: "He would stand in this cubbyhole, beautiful view across the hills, and peck type on an old typewriter... there was an old piano up at Joan's... and peck piano playing... up until noon he would drink black coffee then switch over to red wine, quit about five or six." He recorded it on October 23, 1963, when the trial was still relatively fresh news, and incorporated it into his live repertoire immediately, before releasing the studio version on February 10, 1964.

The song juxtaposes Zantzinger's wealth and connections with the brevity of that sentence. Despite the song's topical nature, Dylan has continued to perform it in concert as of October 2012. His live-audience renditions of it appear on the albums The Bootleg Series Vol. 5: Bob Dylan Live 1975, The Rolling Thunder Revue (2002; recorded November 21, 1975), The Bootleg Series Vol. 6: Bob Dylan Live 1964, Concert at Philharmonic Hall (2004; recorded October 31, 1964), and Live 1962-1966: Rare Performances From The Copyright Collections (2018; recorded October 26, 1963). In 2019, five live performances of the song from the 1975 Rolling Thunder Revue tour were released on the box set The Rolling Thunder Revue: The 1975 Live Recordings.

In Chronicles: Volume One, Dylan includes "The Lonesome Death of Hattie Carroll" in a list of his early songs which he feels were influenced by his introduction to the work of Bertolt Brecht and Kurt Weill. He describes writing out the words of "Pirate Jenny" (or "The Black Freighter") in order to understand how the Brecht–Weill song achieved its effect. Dylan writes: "Woody had never written a song like that. It wasn't a protest or a topical song and there was no love for people in it. I took the song apart and unzipped it—it was the free verse association, the structure and disregard for the known certainty of melodic pattern to make it seriously matter, give it its cutting edge. It also had the ideal chorus for the lyrics."

Literary critic Christopher Ricks considers the song to be "one of Dylan's greatest" and the recording on The Times They Are A-Changin' to be "perfect". He devotes an entire chapter to it, analyzing both the meaning as well as the prosody in his book on Dylan's songs as poetry. "But here is a song that could not be written better."

Dylan's song ("The Lonesome Death of Hattie Carroll") contains at least two inaccuracies. Zantzinger was not booked for first degree murder, but for second degree murder. Dylan also misspells and mispronounces Zantzinger's surname as "Zanzinger".

== Impact on Zantzinger ==
After serving his sentence for manslaughter, Zantzinger returned to running the farm in Charles County and began selling real estate. He moved to more urban Waldorf, Maryland, still within Charles County. Eventually he moved to a 2-acre (8,100 m^{2}) home in Port Tobacco, where he lived throughout the 1990s until moving to a new home in St. Mary's County around 2001 in Chaptico, Maryland, called Bachelor's Hope.

In addition to federal tax delinquencies, Zantzinger fell more than $18,000 behind on county taxes on properties he owned in two Charles County communities called Patuxent Woods and Indian Head, shanties he leased to impoverished Black people. In 1986, the same year the IRS ruled against him, Charles County confiscated those properties. Nonetheless, Zantzinger continued to collect rents, raise rents, and even successfully prosecute his putative tenants for back rent. In June 1991, Zantzinger was initially charged with a single count of "deceptive trade practices". After some delay, Zantzinger pleaded guilty to 50 misdemeanor counts of unfair and deceptive trade practices. He was sentenced to 19 months in prison and a $50,000 fine. Some of his prison sentence was served in a work release program.

In 2001, Zantzinger discussed the song with Howard Sounes for Down the Highway, the Life of Bob Dylan. He dismissed the song as a "total lie" and claimed "It's actually had no effect upon my life", but expressed scorn for Dylan, saying, "He's a no-account son of a bitch; he's just like a scum of a scum bag of the earth. I should have sued him and put him in jail."

William "Billy" Zantzinger died in Charlotte Hall, Maryland, on January 3, 2009, at the age of 69.

== See also ==
- List of Bob Dylan songs based on earlier tunes

== Sources ==
- Frazier, Ian, "Legacy of a Lonely Death". Mother Jones, November/December 2004, 42–47; partial version on line. Reprinted by The Guardian February 25, 2005, as "Life after a lonesome death" (full version with the full song lyrics).
- "Farmer Convicted in Barmaid's Death", New York Times June 28, 1963. p. 11
- "Farmer Sentenced in Barmaid's Death", New York Times August 29, 1963. p. 15
- Dylan, Bob (2004). Chronicles: Volume One. Simon and Schuster. ISBN 0-7432-2815-4.
