= Charles Badger Clark =

American cowboy poet

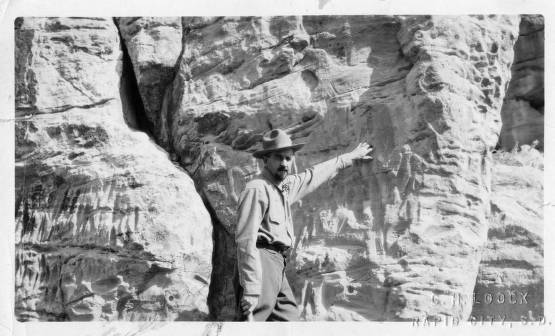
- Badger Clark posing with petroglyphs in an unidentified location in 1928
- Born: January 1, 1883; Albia, Iowa, U.S.
- Died: September 26, 1957 (aged 74); Rapid City, South Dakota, U.S.
- Education: Dakota Wesleyan University (did not graduate)
- Occupation: Poet

Charles Badger Clark (January 1, 1883 – September 26, 1957) was an American cowboy poet, and the first poet laureate of South Dakota.

== Early life ==
Charles Badger Clark was born on January 1, 1883, in Albia, Iowa. His family moved to Dakota Territory, where his father served as a Methodist preacher in Huron, Mitchell, Deadwood and Hot Springs, preaching at Calamity Jane's funeral. Charles dropped out of Dakota Wesleyan University after he clashed with one of its founders, C. B. Clark. He travelled to Cuba, returned to Deadwood, South Dakota, where he contracted tuberculosis, then moved to Tombstone, Arizona to assuage his illness with the dry weather. He returned again to South Dakota in 1910 to take care of his ailing father.

== Career ==
While in Arizona, Clark had spent four years watching a remote ranch. With time on his hands, he wrote letters back to his family in South Dakota, sometimes describing his new world in verse. His stepmother liked one of his Arizona poems so much that she submitted it to The Pacific Monthly magazine. Pacific published it in 1907 as the poem Ridin' and sent Clark a check for $10. He later recalled thinking, "If they'll pay for such stuff, why here's the job I've been looking for all along - no boss, no regular hours [or] responsibility."

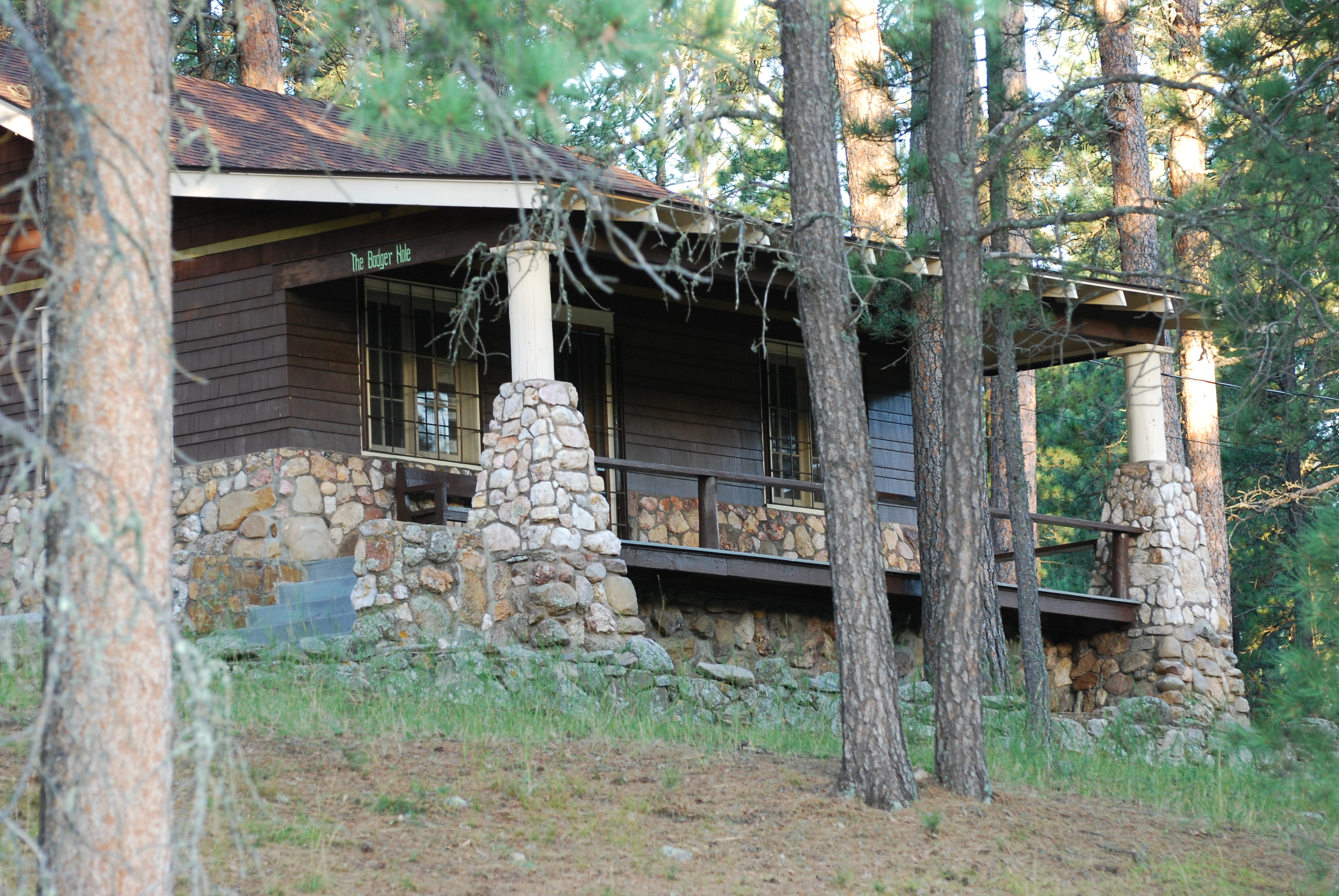
Badger Hole, Clark's cabin in Custer State Park

Clark published his first poetry collection in 1917. In 1925, he moved to a cabin in Custer State Park in the Black Hills of South Dakota, where he lived for thirty years and continued to write poetry.

Clark was named the Poet Laureate of South Dakota by Governor Leslie Jensen in 1937. His work was published in Sunset Magazine, The Pacific Monthly, Arizona Highways, Colliers, Century Magazine, the Rotarian, and Scribner's.

== Death and legacy ==
Clark died on September 26, 1957, in Rapid City, South Dakota. He's buried at Evergreen Cemetery, Hot Springs, South Dakota (Block 4, Section M, Lot 7).

His poem entitled "Lead My America" was performed by the Fred Waring Chorus in 1957. Pete Seeger included "Spanish Is the Loving Tongue" on his 1960 album The Rainbow Quest. In 1969, Bob Dylan recorded "Spanish is the Loving Tongue". In America by Heart, Sarah Palin quotes his poem entitled "A Cowboy's Prayer" as one of the prayers she likes to recite. In 1989, he was inducted into the Hall of Great Westerners of the National Cowboy & Western Heritage Museum.

== Bibliography ==
- Grass-Grown Tales (1917)
- Sun and Saddle Leather (1919)
- Spike (1925)
- When Hot Springs Was a Pup (1927)
- God of the Open
- Sky Lines and Wood Smoke (1935)
- The Story of Custer City, S.D. (1941)
- Boot and Bylines (posthumous, 1978)
- Singleton (posthumous, 1978)

== Books ==
- Jessie Y. Sundstrom: Badger Clark, Cowboy Poet with Universal Appeal, Custer, S.D., 2004
