= Ballad of Hollis Brown =

Song by Bob Dylan

from the album The Times They Are A-Changin'
- Released: January 13, 1964
- Recorded: August 7, 1963
- Genre: Folk
- Length: 5:06
- Label: Columbia
- Songwriter(s): Bob Dylan
- Producer(s): Tom Wilson

"Ballad of Hollis Brown" is a folk song written by Bob Dylan, released in 1964 on his third album The Times They Are A-Changin'. The song tells the story of a South Dakota farmer who, overwhelmed by the desperation of poverty, kills his wife, children, and then himself.

== Music and structure ==
The Times They Are A-Changin' version was recorded on August 7, 1963. The song had been recorded during sessions for Dylan's previous album, The Freewheelin' Bob Dylan, in November 1962, but remained an outtake. In this earlier version, Dylan played the harmonica and just strummed the chords rather than picking the strings. (The live versions between 1962 and 1964 were also played that way, but without the harmonica.) According to Michael Gray, the guitar work and melodic structuring in "Hollis Brown" are taken from the Appalachians, "where such forms and modes had evolved, in comparative isolation, over a period of almost two hundred years". More specifically, the chords, tune and verse-structure of "Ballad of Hollis Brown" are based on the ballad "Pretty Polly", a song Dylan performed at the Gaslight Club in New York City prior to recording "Ballad of Hollis Brown".

The album version of the song is performed as a solo piece by Dylan, with his vocals accompanied by an acoustic guitar in the flatpicking style. The guitar is in 'double-dropped D tuning': Both the first and sixth strings, which normally play two Es separated by two octaves, are tuned down a whole step, down to D. Also, Dylan uses a capo on the first fret. Therefore, while his fingers are positioned as if he were playing in the key of D minor, the song is actually in the key of E♭ minor.

== Lyrics ==
Lyrically, this song consists of 11 verses that bring the listener to a bleak and destitute South Dakota farm, where a poor farmer, his wife, and five children living in abject poverty are subjected to even more hardships. In despair, the man kills his wife, children, and himself with a shotgun. Critic David Horowitz commented:

Technically speaking, "Hollis Brown" is a tour de force. For a ballad is normally a form which puts one at a distance from its tale. This ballad, however, is told in the second person, present tense, so that not only is a bond forged immediately between the listener and the figure of the tale, but there is the ironic fact that the only ones who know of Hollis Brown's plight, the only ones who care, are the hearers who are helpless to help, cut off from him, even as we in a mass society are cut off from each other.... Indeed, the blues perspective itself, uncompromising, isolated and sardonic, is superbly suited to express the squalid reality of contemporary America. And what a powerful expression it can be, once it has been liberated (as it has in Dylan's hands) from its egocentric bondage! A striking example of the tough, ironic insight one associates with the blues (and also of the power of understatement which Dylan has learnt from Guthrie) is to be found in the final lines of Hollis Brown:

There's seven people dead on a South Dakota farm,
There's seven people dead on a South Dakota farm,
Somewhere in the distance there's seven new people born.

== Live performances ==
Dylan played "Hollis Brown" live from 1962 to 1964, including on a Westinghouse television special in 1963 and at Brandeis University in May 1963 (released in 2011 on Bob Dylan in Concert – Brandeis University 1963). He also performed it in 1965, during the "comeback" Bob Dylan and the Band 1974 Tour, and at Live Aid in 1985. The song was regularly featured during the Never Ending Tour through 2012. Dylan has played it more than 200 times in total.

== Recordings by other artists ==
Some of the prominent musicians and groups that have covered "Ballad of Hollis Brown" include:

- Nina Simone: Let It All Out (1965)
- Hugues Aufray: Chante Dylan (1965), Trans Dylan (1995), Au Casino de Paris (1996)
- Cornelis Vreeswijk: Kalle Holm (1974, Swedish)
- Nazareth: Loud 'N' Proud (1974)
- Leon Russell: Stop All That Jazz (1974)
- The Stooges: Death Trip (1987), Open Up and Bleed (1995), Wild Love (2001)
- The Neville Brothers: Yellow Moon (1989)
- Stephen Stills: Stills Alone (1991)
- Billy Childish: The Ballad of Hollis Brown (1992)
- Old Blind Dogs: Legacy (1995)
- Mike Seeger (performed with Bob Dylan): Third Annual Farewell Reunion (1995)
- Stone the Crows: The BBC Sessions Volume 1 (1969–1970) (1998)
- Rise Against: Chimes of Freedom: Songs of Bob Dylan Honoring 50 Years of Amnesty International (2012)
- David Lynch: The Big Dream (2013)
