= Spanish Is the Loving Tongue =

1925 American song

Song
- Published: 1925
- Genre: Folk
- Composer: Billy Simon
- Lyricist: Charles Badger Clark

"Spanish Is the Loving Tongue" is a song based on the poem "A Border Affair" written by Charles Badger Clark in 1907. Clark was a cowboy poet who lived throughout the American West, and was named the Poet Laureate of South Dakota in 1937. The poem was set to music in 1925 by Billy Simon.

Over the years, the song was recorded by many top recording artists, including Bob Dylan, Darrell Scott, Ian and Sylvia, Tom Paxton, Judy Collins, Marianne Faithfull, Strawbs, Emmylou Harris, The Hootenanny Singers (in an arrangement by Björn Ulvaeus), Bill Staines, Michael Martin Murphey and The Chad Mitchell Trio (under the name "Adios, mi Corazon").
