= Percy's Song =

1985 song by Bob Dylan

Song by Bob Dylan

from the album Biograph
- Released: November 7, 1985
- Recorded: October 23, 1963
- Studio: Studio A (New York)
- Length: 7:40
- Songwriter: Bob Dylan

"Percy's Song" is a song written by Bob Dylan. It was recorded during the October 1963 sessions for Dylan's third album, The Times They Are A-Changin', but ultimately not included on that album. Dylan performed the song on stage at his Carnegie Hall concert on October 26, 1963.

Folk star Joan Baez performed "Percy's Song" in the 1967 documentary film Dont Look Back, which made the song known to the general public. The British folk rock group Fairport Convention recorded "Percy's Song" on their third album, released in 1969, Unhalfbricking. Then Arlo Guthrie recorded it for his 1970 album Washington County; this version achieved some progressive rock radio airplay in the United States.

Dylan's recording was not officially released until 1985 when it appeared in the Biograph box set. In the notes to that collection, Dylan credits Paul Clayton for the song's "beautiful melody line." Clayton had played "The Wind and the Rain" to him, a variant of "The Twa Sisters", Child ballad 10.

Dylan wrote the song from the point of view of a narrating character. The song relates the story of a fatal car crash and a subsequent manslaughter conviction and 99-year sentence in Joliet Prison that is handed down to the driver (a friend of the first-person narrator). The narrator goes to ask the sentencing judge to commute his friend's sentence which he considers too harsh, but the sentence stands. The story of the hard-hearted judge is reminiscent of the Child ballad "Geordie".
