= List of songs written by Bob Dylan =

This list contains songs written by American singer-songwriter Bob Dylan, including those where he is credited as co-author. The list omits traditional songs where Dylan has claimed arranger's copyright.

== List ==
Sortable table
Recorded	Song title	Writer(s)	Album release	Released	Notes
2002	'Cross the Green Mountain	Dylan	Gods and Generals (Original Motion Picture Soundtrack)	2003	Later included on The Bootleg Series Vol. 8: Tell Tale Signs: Rare and Unreleased 1989–2006
1997	'Til I Fell in Love with You	Dylan	Time Out of Mind	1997	
1990	10,000 Men	Dylan	Under the Red Sky	1990	
1967	2 Dollars and Ninety Nine Cents	Dylan	The Bootleg Series Vol. 11: The Basement Tapes Complete	2014	
1990	2 X 2	Dylan	Under the Red Sky	1990	
1985	26 Storeys High	Dylan	Unreleased	N/A	Recorded in 1985 but unreleased
1966	4th Time Around	Dylan	Blonde on Blonde	1966	
1990	7 Deadly Sins	Dylan, Jeff Lynne, Tom Petty, George Harrison	Traveling Wilburys Vol. 3	1990	
1974	Abandoned Love	Dylan	Biograph	1985	
1966	Absolutely Sweet Marie	Dylan	Blonde on Blonde	1966	
1980	Ain't Gonna Go to Hell (For Anybody)	Dylan	The Bootleg Series Vol. 13: Trouble No More 1979–1981	2017	Performed live by Dylan 1980s
1963	Ain't Gonna Grieve	Dylan	The Bootleg Series Vol. 9 – The Witmark Demos: 1962–1964	2010	
1979	Ain't No Man Righteous (No Not One)	Dylan	The Bootleg Series Vol. 13: Trouble No More 1979–1981	2017	Recorded by Maria Muldaur for her 1985 album "Live in London"
2006	Ain't Talkin'	Dylan	Modern Times	2006	
1967	All Along the Watchtower	Dylan	John Wesley Harding	1967	
1967	All-American Boy	Dylan	The Bootleg Series Vol. 11: The Basement Tapes Complete	2014	"Big Pink" recording
1996	All I Ever Loved is You	Dylan	Unreleased	N/A	Time Out of Mind outtake
1964	All I Really Want to Do	Dylan	Another Side of Bob Dylan	1964	
1965	All I've Got is All I Want	Dylan	Unreleased	N/A	Work-in-progress song heard in Dont Look Back
1963	All Over You	Dylan	The Bootleg Series Vol. 9 – The Witmark Demos: 1962–1964	2010	
1970	All the Tired Horses	Dylan	Self Portrait	1970	
1981	All the Way	Dylan	Unreleased	N/A	Shot of Love outtake. NOTE: Not the same song as All the Way Down.
1981	All the Way Down	Dylan	Unreleased	N/A	Recorded in 1981, registered for copyright in 1985
1967	All You Have to Do is Dream	Dylan	The Bootleg Series Vol. 11: The Basement Tapes Complete	2014	"Big Pink" recording
1987	Almost Endless Sleep	Dylan	Unreleased	N/A	Down in the Groove outtake.
1981	Almost Persuaded	Dylan	Unreleased	N/A	Recorded in 1981 but never released
1978	Am I Your Stepchild?	Dylan	Unreleased	N/A	Played live in 1978 but unrecorded
1969	Amen	Dylan	The Bootleg Series Vol. 15: Travelin' Thru, 1967–1969	2018	
1973	And He Killed Me Too	Dylan	2023	N/A	Pat Garrett & Billy the Kid outtake. Released on Bob Dylan 1973: 50th Anniversary Copyright Collection.
N/A	Angel of Rain (Almost Done)	Dylan, Helena Springs	Unreleased	N/A	Rehearsed for the 1978 tour, but never performed
1981	Angelina	Dylan	The Bootleg Series Volumes 1–3 (Rare & Unreleased) 1961–1991	1991	Shot of Love outtake
1967	Any Time	Dylan	The Bootleg Series Vol. 11: The Basement Tapes Complete	2014	
1967	Apple Suckling Tree	Dylan	The Basement Tapes	1975	
1980	Are You Ready?	Dylan	Saved	1980	
1967	As I Went Out One Morning	Dylan	John Wesley Harding	1967	
1982	Average People	Dylan	Unreleased	N/A	Recorded in 1982 but unreleased
1985	Baby Coming Back From the Dead	Dylan	Unavailable	N/A	Recorded in 1985
1979	Baby Give It Up	Dylan, Helena Springs	Unreleased	N/A	Recorded in 1979
1962	Baby, I'm in the Mood for You	Dylan	Biograph	1985	The Freewheelin' Bob Dylan outtake
1978	Baby, Stop Crying	Dylan	Street-Legal	1978	
1967	Baby, Won't You Be My Baby	Dylan	The Bootleg Series Vol. 11: The Basement Tapes Complete	2014	"Big Pink" recording
2010	Back Alley	Dylan	Unreleased	2010	Instrumental from the film My Own Love Song
1983	Back to the Wall	Dylan	Unreleased	N/A	Infidels outtake
1962	Ballad for a Friend	Dylan	The Bootleg Series Vol. 9 – The Witmark Demos: 1962–1964	2010	
1964	Ballad in Plain D	Dylan	Another Side of Bob Dylan	1964	
1965	Ballad of a Thin Man	Dylan	Highway 61 Revisited	1965	
1962	Ballad of Donald White	Dylan	Best of Broadside 1963–1988	2000	Broadside recording session
N/A	Ballad of Easy Rider	Dylan, Roger McGuinn	Unreleased	N/A	Recorded by Roger McGuinn for the 1969 film Easy Rider
1967	The Ballad of Frankie Lee and Judas Priest	Dylan	John Wesley Harding	1967	
1963	Ballad of Hollis Brown	Dylan	The Times They Are a-Changin'	1964	
N/A	Ballad of the Gliding Swan	Evan Jones, Dylan	Released on The Bootleg Series Vol. 18: Through the Open Window 1956–1963	N/A	Appeared in the BBC teleplay, Madhouse on Castle Street
N/A	Ballad of the Ox Bow Incident	Dylan	Unreleased	N/A	Rumored to have been written in December 1961
1986	Band of the Hand (It's Hell Time Man!)	Dylan	Band of the Hand OST	1986	
1981	Be Careful (I Don't Care)	Dylan	Unreleased	N/A	Shot of Love outtake
2021	Be Not Deceived	Dylan, Post Malone	Unreleased	N/A	Lyrics by Dylan, music by Post Malone. Aborted collaboration.
N/A	Belltower Blues	Dylan	Unreleased	N/A	
2008	Beyond Here Lies Nothin'	Dylan, Robert Hunter	Together Through Life	2009	
2006	Beyond the Horizon	Dylan	Modern Times	2006	
1958/9	Big Black Train	Dylan, Monte Edmondson	Unreleased	N/A	Home recording
N/A	Big City Blues	Dylan	Unreleased	N/A	Written in 1961, exists in manuscript form only
1967	Big Dog	Dylan	The Bootleg Series Vol. 11: The Basement Tapes Complete	2014	
2010	Billie #30	Dylan	Unreleased	2010	Instrumental from the film My Own Love Song
1973	Billy 1	Dylan	Pat Garrett & Billy the Kid	1973	
1973	Billy 4	Dylan	Pat Garrett & Billy the Kid	1973	
1973	Billy 7	Dylan	Pat Garrett & Billy the Kid	1973	
1973	Billy Surrenders	Dylan	Unreleased	N/A	Pat Garrett & Billy the Kid outtake
1973	Billy (The Ballad of Billy the Kid)	Dylan	Unreleased	N/A	Pat Garrett & Billy the Kid outtake, song contains parts of Billy 1, 3 and 7
1964	Black Crow Blues	Dylan	Another Side of Bob Dylan	1964	
1975	Black Diamond Bay	Dylan, Jacques Levy	Desire	1976	
2020	Black Rider	Dylan	Rough and Rowdy Ways	2020	
1979	Blessed Is the Name	Dylan	The Bootleg Series Vol. 13: Trouble No More 1979–1981	2017	
1983	Blind Willie McTell	Dylan	The Bootleg Series Volumes 1–3 (Rare & Unreleased) 1961–1991	1991	Infidels outtake
1963	Blowin' in the Wind	Dylan	The Freewheelin' Bob Dylan	1963	
2010	Blues Club (Playback)	Dylan	Unreleased	2010	Instrumental from the film My Own Love Song
1974	Blues in E (for Ellen)	Dylan	Unreleased	1974	Lyric fragment auctioned in 2026
1963	Blues Jam	Dylan	The 50th Anniversary Collection - 1963	2013	
1964	Bob and Eric Blues #1	Dylan, Eric Von Schmidt	The 50th Anniversary Collection - 1964		
1965	Bob Dylan's 115th Dream	Dylan	Bringing It All Back Home	1965	
1963	Bob Dylan's Blues	Dylan	The Freewheelin' Bob Dylan	1963	
1963	Bob Dylan's Dream	Dylan	The Freewheelin' Bob Dylan	1963	
1963	Bob Dylan's New Orleans Rag	Dylan	The 50th Anniversary Collection 1963	2013	
1961	Bonnie, Why'd You Cut My Hair?	Dylan	Unreleased	N/A	Minneapolis tape
1963	Boots of Spanish Leather	Dylan	The Times They Are a-Changin'	1964	
1990	Born in Time	Dylan	Under the Red Sky	1990	
1981	Borrowed Time	Dylan	The Bootleg Series Vol. 16: Springtime in New York 1980–1985	N/A	Recorded in 1981
1999	Bottleneck Polka	Dylan	Unreleased	N/A	Copyrighted by Dylan in 1999. Believed to be one of two songs performed on Dharma & Greg
1963	Bound to Lose, Bound to Win	Dylan	The Bootleg Series Vol. 9 – The Witmark Demos: 1962–1964	2010	
1967	Bourbon Street	Dylan	The Bootleg Series Vol. 11: The Basement Tapes Complete	2014	"Big Pink" recording
N/A	Bowling Alley Blues	Dylan	Unreleased	N/A	Lyrics printed in Writings and Drawings
1985	Bring it Home to Me	Dylan	Unreleased	N/A	
1967	Bring It On Home	Dylan	The Bootleg Series Vol. 11: The Basement Tapes Complete	2014	
1999	Broadway Strut	Dylan	Unreleased	N/A	Copyrighted by Dylan in 1999. Believed to be one of two songs performed on Dharma & Greg
1978	Brown Skin Girl	Dylan, Helena Springs	Unreleased	1978	
1986	Brownsville Girl	Dylan, Sam Shepard	Knocked Out Loaded	1986	
N/A	B-Thang	Dylan	Unreleased	1989	Instrumental performed live in 1989
1974	Buckets of Rain	Dylan	Blood on the Tracks	1975	
2010	Bumble Bee	Dylan	Unreleased	2010	Instrumental from the film My Own Love Song
1973	Bunkhouse Theme	Dylan	Pat Garrett & Billy the Kid	1973	
2001	Bye and Bye	Dylan	Love and Theft	2001	
1965	California	Dylan	NCIS: The Official TV Soundtrack - Vol. 2	2009	Bringing It All Back Home outtake
N/A	California Brown Eyed Baby	Dylan	Unreleased	N/A	Written in 1961
1974	Call Letter Blues	Dylan	The Bootleg Series Volumes 1–3 (Rare & Unreleased) 1961–1991	1991	Blood on the Tracks outtake
1965	Can You Please Crawl Out Your Window?	Dylan	Biograph	1985	single, 1965
2005	Can't Escape from You	Dylan	The Bootleg Series Vol. 8: Tell Tale Signs	2008	
1997	Can't Wait	Dylan	Time Out of Mind	1997	
1973	Cantina Theme (Workin' for the Law)	Dylan	Pat Garrett & Billy the Kid	1973	
N/A	Card Shark	Dylan, Taylor Goldsmith	Unreleased	N/A	Lyrics written by Dylan during the Basement Tapes era. Finished, recorded and released in 2014 by The New Basement Tapes
1981	Caribbean Wind	Dylan	Biograph	1985	Shot of Love outtake
1990	Cat's in the Well	Dylan	Under the Red Sky	1990	
1975	Catfish	Dylan, Jacques Levy	The Bootleg Series Volumes 1–3 (Rare & Unreleased) 1961–1991	1991	Desire outtake
1969	Champaign, Illinois	Dylan, Carl Perkins	Unreleased	N/A	Recorded by Carl Perkins for his 1969 album On Top
1978	Changing of the Guards	Dylan	Street-Legal	1978	
2008	Chicago After Dark	Dylan	Unreleased	2009	Together Through Life outtake discussed with Bill Flanagan
1964	Chimes of Freedom	Dylan	Another Side of Bob Dylan	1964	
1980	City of Gold	Dylan	The Bootleg Series Vol. 13: Trouble No More 1979–1981	2003	Recorded by the Dixie Hummingbirds for their album, Diamond Jubilation; also on soundtrack of Masked and Anonymous
1985	Clean Cut Kid	Dylan	Empire Burlesque	1985	
2010	Click Clack	Dylan	Unreleased	2010	Instrumental from the film My Own Love Song
1967	Clothesline Saga	Dylan	The Basement Tapes	1975	
1997	Cold Irons Bound	Dylan	Time Out of Mind	1997	
1961	Colorado Blues	Dylan	Unreleased	N/A	
N/A	Coming from the Heart (The Road is Long)	Dylan, Helena Springs	Unreleased	N/A	Recorded by The Searchers for their 1979 album, The Searchers
1988	Congratulations	Dylan; Jeff Lynne; Tom Petty; Roy Orbison; George Harrison	Traveling Wilburys Vol. 1	1988	
1990	Cool Dry Place	Dylan, Jeff Lynne, Tom Petty, George Harrison	Traveling Wilburys Vol. 3	1990	
1969	Country Pie	Dylan	Nashville Skyline	1969	
1980	Covenant Woman	Dylan	Saved	1980	
1980	Cover Down, Pray Through	Dylan	The Bootleg Series Vol. 13: Trouble No More 1979–1981	2017	
1967	Crash on the Levee (Down in the Flood)	Dylan	The Basement Tapes	1975	
2020	Crossing the Rubicon	Dylan	Rough and Rowdy Ways	2020	
1973	Crosswind Jamboree	Dylan	Unreleased	N/A	Instrumental outtake from Planet Waves
2001	Cry a While	Dylan	Love and Theft	2001	
1962	Cuban Missile Crisis	Dylan	Unreleased	N/A	Broadside recording session
1985	Dark Eyes	Dylan	Empire Burlesque	1985	
1983	Dark Groove	Dylan	Unreleased	N/A	Infidels outtake
1970	Day of the Locusts	Dylan	New Morning	1970	
N/A	Dead for a Dollar	Dylan	Unreleased	N/A	Written in 1961. Exists in manuscript form only
1981	Dead Man, Dead Man	Dylan	Shot of Love	1981	
1967	Dear Landlord	Dylan	John Wesley Harding	1967	
1983/7	Death Is Not The End	Dylan	Down in the Groove	1988	
1962	The Death of Emmett Till	Dylan	The 50th Anniversary Collection: The Copyright Extension Collection, Volume 1	2012	take 1 (Broadside recording session version is still unreleased officially but available on bootlegs)
1962	Death of Robert Johnson	Dylan	Unreleased	N/A	Leeds Music publishing demo
1964	Denise	Dylan	The 50th Anniversary Collection 1964	2014	Lyrics printed in Lyrics: 1962–1985, under Another Side of Bob Dylan; outtake for that album
1965	Desolation Row	Dylan	Highway 61 Revisited	1965	
1990	The Devil's Been Busy	Dylan, Jeff Lynne, Tom Petty, George Harrison	Traveling Wilburys Vol. 3	1990	
N/A	Diamond Ring	Dylan, Goldsmith	Unreleased	N/A	Lyrics written by Dylan during the Basement Tapes era. Finished, recorded and released in 2014 by The New Basement Tapes
1989	Dignity	Dylan	The Bootleg Series Vol. 8: Tell Tale Signs	2008	
1973	Dirge	Dylan	Planet Waves	1974	
1997	Dirt Road Blues	Dylan	Time Out of Mind	1997	
N/A	Dirty Lie	Dylan, Laura Rogers, Lydia Rogers	Unreleased	N/A	Released on the Secret Sisters album Put Your Needle Down
1988	Dirty World	Dylan, Jeff Lynne, Tom Petty, Roy Orbison, George Harrison	Traveling Wilburys Vol. 1	1988	
1989	Disease of Conceit	Dylan	Oh Mercy	1989	
1979	Do Right to Me Baby (Do Unto Others)	Dylan	Slow Train Coming	1979	
1983	Don't Drink No Chevy	Dylan	Unreleased	N/A	Infidels outtake
1981	Don't Ever Take Yourself Away	Dylan	Hawaii Five-0: Original Songs From the Television Series	2011	Recorded in 1981
1983	Don't Fall Apart on Me Tonight	Dylan	Infidels	1983	
1983	Don't Fly Unless It's Safe	Dylan	Infidels	1983	Infidels outtake
N/A	Don't Let Anyone Write Your Story	Dylan, Gerry Goffin, Carole King	Unreleased	N/A	
N/A	Don't Let My Deal Go Down	Dylan	Unreleased	N/A	Written in 1961. Exists in manuscript form only.
2023	Don't Make Her Cry	Dylan, Regina McCrary, Julie Miller	Released on Buddy and Julie Miller's album In the Throes	2023	According to McCrary she and Dylan co-wrote this in 2017
1966	Don't Tell Him, Tell Me	Dylan	The Bootleg Series Vol. 12: The Cutting Edge 1965–1966 Collector's Edition	2015	Recorded in a Denver hotel room, March 13, 1966
1962	Don't Think Twice, It's All Right	Dylan	The Freewheelin' Bob Dylan	1963	
N/A	Don't Want No Married Woman	Dylan	Unreleased	N/A	Lyric written in 1974
1967	Don't Ya Tell Henry	Dylan	The Basement Tapes	1975	Recorded with The Band
1967	Don't You Try Me Now	Dylan	The Bootleg Series Vol. 11: The Basement Tapes Complete	2014	"Big Pink" recording
1967	Down Along the Cove	Dylan	John Wesley Harding	1967	
N/A	Down at Washington Square	Dylan	Unreleased	N/A	Written in 1961. Exists in manuscript form only.
1967	Down by the Station	Dylan	The Bootleg Series Vol. 11: The Basement Tapes Complete	2014	
N/A	Down on the Bottom	Dylan, Jim James	Unreleased	N/A	Lyrics written by Dylan during the Basement Tapes era. Finished, recorded and released in 2014 by The New Basement Tapes
1963	Down the Highway	Dylan	The Freewheelin' Bob Dylan	1963	
1997	Dreamin' of You	Dylan	The Bootleg Series Vol. 8: Tell Tale Signs	2008	Time Out of Mind outtake.
1967	Dress It Up, Better Have It All	Dylan	The Bootleg Series Vol. 11: The Basement Tapes Complete	2014	
1967	Drifter's Escape	Dylan	John Wesley Harding	1967	
1986	Driftin' Too Far From Shore	Dylan	Knocked Out Loaded	1986	
2010	Driving South	Dylan	Unreleased	2010	Instrumental from the film My Own Love Song
N/A	Duncan and Jimmy	Dylan, Rhiannon Giddens	Unreleased	N/A	Lyrics written by Dylan during the Basement Tapes era. Finished, recorded and released in 2014 by The New Basement Tapes
2012	Duquesne Whistle	Dylan, Robert Hunter	Tempest	2012	
1963	Dusty Old Fairgrounds	Dylan	The 50th Anniversary Collection 1963	2013	Performed live, April 12, 1963, New York City Town Hall
2012	Early Roman Kings	Dylan	Tempest	2012	
1963	East Laredo Blues	Dylan	The 50th Anniversary Collection - 1963	2013	
2010	East Texas	Dylan	Unreleased	2010	Instrumental from the film My Own Love Song
1967	Edge of the Ocean	Dylan	The Bootleg Series Vol. 11: The Basement Tapes Complete	2014	
1985	Emotionally Yours	Dylan	Empire Burlesque	1985	
1988	End of the Line	Dylan; Jeff Lynne; Tom Petty; Roy Orbison; George Harrison	Traveling Wilburys Vol. 1	1988	
N/A	Enough is Enough	Dylan	The Bootleg Series Vol. 16: Springtime in New York 1980–1985	2021	Played live three times in 1984
1963	Eternal Circle	Dylan	The Bootleg Series Volumes 1–3 (Rare & Unreleased) 1961–1991	1991	The Times They Are A-Changin' outtake.
N/A	E-Thang	Dylan	Unreleased	N/A	Played live four times in 1989.
1981	Every Grain of Sand	Dylan	Shot of Love	1981	Publishing demo on The Bootleg Series Volumes 1–3 (Rare & Unreleased) 1961–1991
N/A	Every Time I Hear the Spirit	Dylan	Unreleased	N/A	Written in 1960.
1989	Everything Is Broken	Dylan	Oh Mercy	1989	
2020	False Prophet	Dylan	Rough and Rowdy Ways	2020	Released as a single on May 8, 2020
1963	Farewell	Dylan	The Bootleg Series Vol. 9 – The Witmark Demos: 1962–1964	2010	
1964	Farewell, Angelina	Dylan	The Bootleg Series Volumes 1–3 (Rare & Unreleased) 1961–1991	1991	Bringing It All Back Home outtake
1970	Father of Night	Dylan	New Morning	1970	
N/A	Field Mouse from Nebraska	Dylan	Unreleased	N/A	Lyrics printed in Writings and Drawings
1973	Final Theme	Dylan	Pat Garrett & Billy the Kid	1973	
1985	Find Me	Dylan	Unreleased	N/A	Recorded in 1985
1984	Firebird (Groovin' at Delta)	Dylan	Unreleased	N/A	Empire Burlesque instrumental outtake
1977	First to Say Goodbye	Dylan	Unreleased	N/A	Instrumental
N/A	Fix It Ma	Dylan	Unreleased	N/A	Rehearsed in 1978
2001	Floater (Too Much to Ask)	Dylan	Love and Theft	2001	
N/A	Florida Key	Dylan, Taylor Goldsmith	Unreleased	N/A	Lyrics written by Dylan during the Basement Tapes era. Finished, recorded and released in 2014 by The New Basement Tapes
1983	Foot of Pride	Dylan	The Bootleg Series Volumes 1–3 (Rare & Unreleased) 1961–1991	1991	Infidels outtake
1975	Footprints in the Sand	Dylan, Jacques Levy	Unreleased	1975	Desire outtake
1971	For You Baby	Dylan, Allen Ginsberg	Unreleased	N/A	Recorded with Ginsberg in 1971
1973	Forever Young	Dylan	Planet Waves	1974	
2008	Forgetful Heart	Dylan, Robert Hunter	Together Through Life	2009	
1965	From a Buick 6	Dylan	Highway 61 Revisited	1965	
1981	Fur Slippers	Dylan, Tim Drummond	The Bootleg Series Vol. 16: Springtime in New York 1980–1985	2021	Recorded by B. B. King for the soundtrack of the CBS TV mini-series "Shake Rattle and Roll"
1965	Gates of Eden	Dylan	Bringing It All Back Home	1965	
N/A	Gates of Hate	Dylan	Unreleased	N/A	Published in Sing Out! October/November 1962
1971	George Jackson	Dylan	Masterpieces	1978	single, 1971 "Big Band" version on Masterpieces, acoustic version on b-side of single
1967	Get Your Rocks Off!	Dylan	The Bootleg Series Vol. 11: The Basement Tapes Complete	2014	"Big Pink" recording
1963	Girl from the North Country	Dylan	The Freewheelin' Bob Dylan	1963	
1981	Give Him My All	Dylan, Regina McCrary	Unreleased	N/A	Recorded by the McCrary Sisters for their Our Journey album in 2010
1981	Glory of Love	Dylan	Unreleased	N/A	Instrumental outtake from Shot of Love
1963	Go Away You Bomb	Dylan	Unreleased	N/A	Written in 1963, lyrics sheet sold in 2014
N/A	Go 'Way Little Boy	Dylan	Unreleased	N/A	Recorded by Lone Justice in 1985
1990	God Knows	Dylan	Under the Red Sky	1990	
1963	Goin' Back to Rome	Dylan	The 50th Anniversary Collection 1963	2013	Performed live Gerde's Folk City, 1963
1967	Goin' to Acapulco	Dylan	The Basement Tapes	1975	
1973	Going, Going, Gone	Dylan	Planet Waves	1974	
1975	Golden Loom	Dylan	The Bootleg Series Volumes 1–3 (Rare & Unreleased) 1961–1991	1991	Desire outtake
N/A	Golden Tom – Silver Judas	Dylan, Elvis Costello	Unreleased	N/A	Lyrics written by Dylan during the Basement Tapes era. Finished, recorded and released in 2014 by The New Basement Tapes
N/A	Gone But Not Forgotten	Dylan, Poo Bear, Jingle Jared	Unreleased	N/A	Recorded by Bear and a Banjo in 2018, lyrics written by Dylan in 1967 (see Lost on the River: The New Basement Tapes)
1979	Gonna Change My Way of Thinking	Dylan	Slow Train Coming	1979	
1967	Gonna Get You Now	Dylan	The Bootleg Series Vol. 11: The Basement Tapes Complete	2014	"Big Pink" recording
1981	Gonna Love Her Anyway	Dylan	Unreleased	N/A	Shot of Love outtake
1973	Goodbye Holly	Dylan	2023	N/A	Pat Garrett & Billy the Kid outtake. Released on Bob Dylan 1973: 50th Anniversary Copyright Collection.
2020	Goodbye Jimmy Reed	Dylan	Rough and Rowdy Ways	2020	
1986	Got My Mind Made Up	Dylan, Tom Petty	Knocked Out Loaded	1986	
1979	Gotta Serve Somebody	Dylan	Slow Train Coming	1979	
1984	Gravity Song	Dylan	Unreleased	1984	Empire Burlesque outtake
N/A	The Great Chicagoan	Dylan	Unreleased	N/A	Written in 1961. Exists in manuscript form only
N/A	Greyhound Blues	Dylan	Unreleased	N/A	Written in 1960.
1981	The Groom's Still Waiting at the Altar	Dylan	Shot of Love	1981	Included after 1985 in re-releases
N/A	G-Thang	Dylan	Unreleased	1989	Played live in 1989
1964	Guess I'm Doin' Fine	Dylan	The Bootleg Series Vol. 9 – The Witmark Demos: 1962–1964	2010	
1963	Gypsy Lou	Dylan	The Bootleg Series Vol. 9 – The Witmark Demos: 1962–1964	2010	
1983/7	Had a Dream About You, Baby	Dylan	Down in the Groove	1988	
1988	Handle With Care	Dylan; Jeff Lynne; Tom Petty; Roy Orbison; George Harrison	Traveling Wilburys Vol. 1	1988	
1990	Handy Dandy	Dylan	Under the Red Sky	1990	
1963	A Hard Rain's a-Gonna Fall	Dylan	The Freewheelin' Bob Dylan	1963	
1961	Hard Times in New York Town	Dylan	The Bootleg Series Volumes 1–3 (Rare & Unreleased) 1961–1991	1991	Minnesota Hotel Tape, a home recording by Tony Glover
1964	Harmonica Duet	Dylan	The 50th Anniversary Collection	2014	
1973	Hazel	Dylan	Planet Waves	1974	
1988	Heading for the Light	Dylan; Jeff Lynne; Tom Petty; Roy Orbison; George Harrison	Traveling Wilburys Vol. 1	1988	
1981	Heart of Mine	Dylan	Shot of Love	1981	
1993	Heartland	Dylan, Willie Nelson	Unreleased	N/A	Recorded by Willie Nelson with Dylan for Nelson's 1993 album Across the Borderline
N/A	Her Memory	Dylan, Helena Springs, Kenny Moore	Unreleased	N/A	Copyrighted by Dylan in 1980
1978	Her Version of Jealousy	Dylan	Unreleased	N/A	Mentioned in an interview with Craig McGregor
1963	Hero Blues	Dylan	The Bootleg Series Vol. 9 – The Witmark Demos: 1962–1964	2010	
1958/9	Hey Little Richard	Dylan	Unreleased	N/A	Home recording
N/A	Hidee Hidee Ho #11	Dylan, James	Unreleased	N/A	Lyrics written by Dylan during the Basement Tapes era. Finished, recorded and released in 2014 by The New Basement Tapes
N/A	Hidee Hidee Ho #16	Dylan, Giddens, Costello	Unreleased	N/A	Lyrics written by Dylan during the Basement Tapes era. Finished, recorded and released in 2014 by The New Basement Tapes
1963	Hiding Too Long	Dylan	The 50th Anniversary Collection 1963	2013	Performed on 12 April 1963 at Town Hall, New York City
1981	High Away (Ah Ah Ah)	Dylan	Unreleased	1981	Shot of Love outtake
2001	High Water (For Charley Patton)	Dylan	Love and Theft	2001	
1997	Highlands	Dylan	Time Out of Mind	1997	
1965	Highway 61 Revisited	Dylan	Highway 61 Revisited	1965	
1975	Hollywood Angel	Dylan	The Rolling Thunder Revue: The 1975 Live Recordings	2019	
2006	Home	Dylan, Gary "Mudbone" Cooper, Dave Stewart	Fresh Mud	2006	Dylan's piano part recorded in 2002; finished song released by Mudbone in 2006
2001	Honest with Me	Dylan	Love and Theft	2001	
1963	Honey Babe	Dylan	The 50th Anniversary Collection - 1963	2013	
1963	Honey, Just Allow Me One More Chance	Dylan, Henry Thomas	The Freewheelin' Bob Dylan	1963	
1984	Honey Wait	Dylan	Unreleased	N/A	Empire Burlesque outtake
1983	How Many Days	Dylan	Unreleased	N/A	Infidels outtake
N/A	Howlin' at Your Window	Dylan, Jude Johnstone	Unreleased	N/A	Instrumental begun by Dylan in 1985, finished by Johnstone in the 1990s and released by Tim Hockenberry in 2008
2006	Huck's Tune	Dylan	The Bootleg Series Vol. 8: Tell Tale Signs	2008	From Lucky You soundtrack
1975	Hurricane	Dylan, Jacques Levy	Desire	1976	
1967	I Am a Lonesome Hobo	Dylan	John Wesley Harding	1967	
1983	I and I	Dylan	Infidels	1983	
1979	I Believe in You	Dylan	Slow Train Coming	1979	
1967	I Can't Come in With a Broken Heart	Dylan	The Bootleg Series Vol. 11: The Basement Tapes Complete	2014	"Big Pink" recording
1966	I Can't Leave Her Behind	Dylan	The Bootleg Series Vol. 12: The Cutting Edge 1965–1966	2015	Glasgow Hotel tape, 1966
1967	I Can't Make It Alone	Dylan	The Bootleg Series Vol. 11: The Basement Tapes Complete	2014	"Big Pink" recording
2026	I Can't Read Your Mind	Dylan, Willie Nelson, Buddy Cannon	Released on Nelson's Dream Chaser (album)	N/A	
2020	I Contain Multitudes	Dylan	Rough and Rowdy Ways	2020	Released as a single on April 17, 2020
1964	I Don't Believe You (She Acts Like We Never Have Met)	Dylan	Another Side of Bob Dylan	1964	
N/A	I Don't Want To Do It	Dylan	Unreleased	N/A	Recorded by George Harrison for the 1985 film Porky's Revenge
1967	I Dreamed I Saw St. Augustine	Dylan	John Wesley Harding	1967	
2008	I Feel a Change Comin' On	Dylan, Robert Hunter	Together Through Life	2009	
1959	I Got a New Girl a.k.a. Teen Love Serenade	Dylan	Unreleased	N/A	Recorded by Dylan's high school friend Ric Kangas
N/A	I Hear a Train A-Rolling	Dylan	Unreleased	N/A	Written in 1961. Exists in manuscript form only
N/A	I Must Love You Too Much	Dylan, Helena Springs	Unreleased	N/A	Recorded by The Band for their 1996 album High on the Hog
1984	I Once Knew a Man	Dylan	Unreleased	N/A	Recorded during Empire Burlesque sessions but unreleased
1967	I Pity the Poor Immigrant	Dylan	John Wesley Harding	1967	
1962	I Rode Out One Morning	Dylan	The 50th Anniversary Collection - 1962	2012	
1984	I See You Around and Around	Dylan	Unreleased	1984	Recorded in 1984 but unreleased
1963	I Shall Be Free	Dylan	The Freewheelin' Bob Dylan	1963	
1964	I Shall Be Free No. 10	Dylan	Another Side of Bob Dylan	1964	
1967	I Shall Be Released	Dylan	Bob Dylan's Greatest Hits Vol. II	1971	
1969	I Threw It All Away	Dylan	Nashville Skyline	1969	
1965	I Wanna Be Your Lover	Dylan	Biograph	1985	Blonde on Blonde outtake
1966	I Want You	Dylan	Blonde on Blonde	1966	
1981	I Want You to Know I Love You	Dylan	Unreleased	N/A	Shot of Love outtake
1961	I Was Young When I Left Home	Dylan	The Bootleg Series Vol. 7: No Direction Home: The Soundtrack	2005	Minnesota Hotel Tape, a home recording by Tony Glover
1980	I Will Love Him	Dylan	The Bootleg Series Vol. 13: Trouble No More 1979–1981	2017	
1962	I'd Hate to Be You on That Dreadful Day	Dylan	The Bootleg Series Vol. 9 – The Witmark Demos: 1962–1964	2010	
N/A	I'd Have You Anytime	Dylan, George Harrison	Unreleased	N/A	Recorded by George Harrison for his 1970 album All Things Must Pass
1967	I'll Be Your Baby Tonight	Dylan	John Wesley Harding	1967	
N/A	I'll Get Where I'm Going Someday	Dylan	Unreleased	N/A	Written in 1961. Exists in manuscript form only
1965	I'll Keep It with Mine	Dylan	Biograph	1985	Blonde on Blonde outtake
1985	I'll Remember You	Dylan	Empire Burlesque	1985	
1967	I'm a Fool for You	Dylan	The Bootleg Series Vol. 11: The Basement Tapes Complete	2014	"Big Pink" recording
1967	I'm Alright	Dylan	The Bootleg Series Vol. 11: The Basement Tapes Complete	2014	
N/A	I'm Cold	Dylan	Unreleased	N/A	Dylan played for Steven Soles in 1977; lyric fragment in Bob Dylan Archive in Tulsa
1967	I'm Not There	Dylan	I'm Not There	2007	
1985	I'm Ready for Love	Dylan	Unreleased	N/A	Recorded in 1985 but unreleased
1967	I'm Your Teenage Prayer	Dylan	The Bootleg Series Vol. 11: The Basement Tapes Complete	2014	"Big Pink" recording
2020	I've Made Up My Mind to Give Myself to You	Dylan	Rough and Rowdy Ways	2020	
1974	Idiot Wind	Dylan	Blood on the Tracks	1975	
1970	If Dogs Run Free	Dylan	New Morning	1970	
N/A	If I Don't Be There by Morning	Dylan, Helena Springs	Unreleased	N/A	Recorded by Eric Clapton for his 1978 album Backless
1966	If I Was a King	Dylan	The Bootleg Series Vol. 12: The Cutting Edge 1965–1966	2015	
1970	If Not for You	Dylan	New Morning	1970	
1990	If You Belonged to Me	Dylan; Jeff Lynne; Tom Petty; George Harrison	Traveling Wilburys Vol. 3	1990	
2008	If You Ever Go to Houston	Dylan, Robert Hunter	Together Through Life	2009	
1965	If You Gotta Go, Go Now (Or Else You Got to Stay All Night)	Dylan	The Bootleg Series Volumes 1–3 (Rare & Unreleased) 1961–1991	1991	Bringing It All Back Home outtake, released as a single in 1967
1974	If You See Her, Say Hello	Dylan	Blood on the Tracks	1975	
1966	If You Want My Love	Dylan	The Bootleg Series Vol. 12: The Cutting Edge 1965–1966	2015	Recorded in a Denver hotel room
1980	In the Garden	Dylan	Saved	1980	
1981	In the Summertime	Dylan	Shot of Love	1981	
1990	Inside Out	Dylan; Jeff Lynne; Tom Petty; George Harrison	Traveling Wilburys Vol. 3	1990	
1981	Is It Worth It?	Dylan	The Bootleg Series Vol. 16: Springtime in New York 1980–1985	1981	Shot of Love outtake
1978	Is Your Love in Vain?	Dylan	Street-Legal	1978	
1975	Isis	Dylan, Jacques Levy	Desire	1976	
1964	It Ain't Me Babe	Dylan	Another Side of Bob Dylan	1964	
1965	It Takes a Lot to Laugh, It Takes a Train to Cry	Dylan	Highway 61 Revisited	1965	
2008	It's All Good	Dylan, Robert Hunter	Together Through Life	2009	
1965	It's All Over Now, Baby Blue	Dylan	Bringing It All Back Home	1965	
1965	It's Alright, Ma (I'm Only Bleeding)	Dylan	Bringing It All Back Home	1965	
1964	Jack O'Diamonds	Dylan, Ben Carruthers	Unreleased	N/A	Poem from the sleeve notes of Another Side of Bob Dylan set to music and recorded by Fairport Convention
N/A	Jammin' Me	Dylan, Tom Petty, Mike Campbell	Unreleased	N/A	Recorded by Tom Petty for his 1987 album Let Me Up (I've Had Enough).
2010	Jane's Lament	Dylan	Unreleased	2010	Instrumental from the film My Own Love Song
2010	Jane's Step	Dylan	Unreleased	2010	Instrumental from the film My Own Love Song
1967	Jelly Bean	Dylan	The Bootleg Series Vol. 11: The Basement Tapes Complete	2014	
1981	Jesus is the One	Dylan	The Bootleg Series Vol. 13: Trouble No More 1979–1981	2017	
1965	Jet Pilot	Dylan	Biograph	1985	Highway 61 Revisited outtake
1975	Joey	Dylan, Jacques Levy	Desire	1976	
2010	Joey's Theme	Dylan	Unreleased	2010	Instrumental from the film My Own Love Song
1962	John Brown	Dylan	The Bootleg Series Vol. 9 – The Witmark Demos: 1962–1964	2010	
1967	John Wesley Harding	Dylan	John Wesley Harding	1967	
1983	Jokerman	Dylan	Infidels	1983	
2008	Jolene	Dylan, Robert Hunter	Together Through Life	2009	
1983	Julius and Ethel	Dylan	The Bootleg Series Vol. 16: Springtime in New York 1980–1985	N/A	Infidels outtake
N/A	Just as Long as I'm in This World	Dylan	Unreleased	N/A	Written in 1961. Exists in manuscript form only.
1966	Just Like a Woman	Dylan	Blonde on Blonde	1966	
1965	Just Like Tom Thumb's Blues	Dylan	Highway 61 Revisited	1965	
N/A	Kansas City	Dylan, Marcus Mumford, Goldsmith	Unreleased	N/A	Lyrics written by Dylan during the Basement Tapes era. Finished, recorded and released in 2014 by The New Basement Tapes
2020	Key West (Philosopher Pirate)	Dylan	Rough and Rowdy Ways	2020	
1967	King of France	Dylan	The Bootleg Series Vol. 11: The Basement Tapes Complete	2014	"Big Pink" recording
1996	King of Kings	Dylan	Unreleased	2001	Instrumental released on Ronnie Wood's Not for Beginners
1962	Kingsport Town	Dylan	The Bootleg Series Volumes 1–3 (Rare & Unreleased) 1961–1991	1991	The Freewheelin' Bob Dylan outtake
1973	Knockin' on Heaven's Door	Dylan	Pat Garrett & Billy the Kid	1973	
1988	Last Night	Dylan; Jeff Lynne; Tom Petty; Roy Orbison; George Harrison	Traveling Wilburys Vol. 1	1988	
1963	Last Thoughts on Woody Guthrie	Dylan	The Bootleg Series Volumes 1–3 (Rare & Unreleased) 1961–1991	1991	Poem recited live in concert at Town Hall
1963	Lay Down Your Weary Tune	Dylan	Biograph	1985	
1969	Lay Lady Lay	Dylan	Nashville Skyline	1969	
N/A	Legionnaire's Disease	Dylan	Unreleased	N/A	Lyrics printed in Lyrics: 1962–1985, under Street-Legal. The song was recorded by the Danish band, Delta Cross Band, and included on their 1982 album, Up Front. The band's American singer and guitarist, Billy Cross, had been touring with Bob Dylan from 1977 to 1979.
1981	Lenny Bruce	Dylan	Shot of Love	1981	
1966	Leopard-Skin Pill-Box Hat	Dylan	Blonde on Blonde	1966	
1985	Let Me Come Baby	Dylan	Unreleased	N/A	Recorded in 1985 but unreleased
1962	Let Me Die in My Footsteps	Dylan	The Bootleg Series Volumes 1–3 (Rare & Unreleased) 1961–1991	1991	The Freewheelin' Bob Dylan outtake
1981	Let's Keep It Between Us	Dylan	The Bootleg Series Vol. 16: Springtime in New York 1980–1985	N/A	Recorded by Bonnie Raitt for her 1982 album Green Light
2006	The Levee's Gonna Break	Dylan	Modern Times	2006	
N/A	Liberty Street	Dylan, Goldsmith	Unreleased	N/A	Lyrics written by Dylan during the Basement Tapes era. Finished, recorded and released in 2014 by The New Basement Tapes
1983	License to Kill	Dylan	Infidels	1983	
2008	Life Is Hard	Dylan, Robert Hunter	Together Through Life	2009	
N/A	Like a Rich Man's Son	Dylan	Unreleased	N/A	Lyric fragment printed in Isis
1965	Like a Rolling Stone	Dylan	Highway 61 Revisited	1965	
1990	Like a Ship	Dylan; Jeff Lynne; Tom Petty; George Harrison	The Traveling Wilburys Collection	2007	
1974	Lily, Rosemary and the Jack of Hearts	Dylan	Blood on the Tracks	1975	
N/A	Listen Robert Moses	Dylan	Unreleased	N/A	Lyric sheet circa 1963
N/A	Liverpool Gal	Dylan	Unreleased	N/A	Lyrics published in In His Own Words 2
1969	Living the Blues	Dylan	Self Portrait	1970	
1967	Lo and Behold!	Dylan	The Basement Tapes	1975	
1967	Lock Your Door	Dylan	The Bootleg Series Vol. 11: The Basement Tapes Complete	2014	"Big Pink" recording
2001	Lonesome Day Blues	Dylan	Love and Theft	2001	
1963	The Lonesome Death of Hattie Carroll	Dylan	The Times They Are a-Changin'	1964	
1962	Long Ago, Far Away	Dylan	The Bootleg Series Vol. 9 – The Witmark Demos: 1962–1964	2010	
2012	Long and Wasted Years	Dylan	Tempest	2012	
1965	Long Distance Operator	Dylan	The Basement Tapes	1975	Recorded by The Band
1962	Long Time Gone	Dylan	The Bootleg Series Vol. 9 – The Witmark Demos: 1962–1964	2010	
1983	Lord Protect My Child	Dylan	The Bootleg Series Volumes 1–3 (Rare & Unreleased) 1961–1991	1991	Infidels outtake
N/A	Lost on the River #12	Dylan, Costello	Unreleased	N/A	Lyrics written by Dylan during the Basement Tapes era. Finished, recorded and released in 2014 by The New Basement Tapes
N/A	Lost on the River #20	Dylan, Giddens, Mumford	Unreleased	N/A	Lyrics written by Dylan during the Basement Tapes era. Finished, recorded and released in 2014 by The New Basement Tapes
1965	Love Is Just a Four-Letter Word	Dylan	Unreleased	N/A	Lyrics printed in Lyrics: 1962–1985, under Bringing It All Back Home.
1967	Love Is Only Mine	Dylan	The Bootleg Series Vol. 11: The Basement Tapes Complete	2014	
1965	Love Minus Zero/No Limit	Dylan	Bringing It All Back Home	1965	
N/A	Love Rescue Me	Dylan, U2	Unreleased	N/A	Recorded by U2 for their album Rattle and Hum
1997	Love Sick	Dylan	Time Out of Mind	1997	
2011	The Love that Faded	Dylan, Hank Williams	The Lost Notebooks of Hank Williams	2011	Lyrics by Williams, music by Dylan.
N/A	Love You Too Much	Dylan, Helena Springs, Greg Lake	Unreleased	N/A	Lyrics printed in Lyrics: 1962–1985, under Street-Legal Recorded by Greg Lake on his eponymous 1981 album and various live versions. A reworking of "I must Love You Too Much".
1966	Lunatic Princess (Why Do You Have to Be So Frantic?)	Dylan	The Bootleg Series Vol. 12: The Cutting Edge 1965–1966	2015	Blonde on Blonde outtake
1965	Maggie's Farm	Dylan	Bringing It All Back Home	1965	
1981	Magic	Dylan	Unreleased	N/A	Shot of Love outtake
1973	Main Title Theme (Billy)	Dylan	Pat Garrett & Billy the Kid	1973	
1997	Make You Feel My Love	Dylan	Time Out of Mind	1997	
1980	Making a Liar Out of Me	Dylan	The Bootleg Series Vol. 13: Trouble No More 1979–1981	2017	
1964	Mama, You Been on My Mind	Dylan	The Bootleg Series Volumes 1–3 (Rare & Unreleased) 1961–1991	1991	Another Side of Bob Dylan outtake
1979	Man Gave Names to All the Animals	Dylan	Slow Train Coming	1979	
1970	The Man in Me	Dylan	New Morning	1970	
1989	Man in the Long Black Coat	Dylan	Oh Mercy	1989	
1983	Man of Peace	Dylan	Infidels	1983	
1961	Man on the Street	Dylan	The Bootleg Series Volumes 1–3 (Rare & Unreleased) 1961–1991	1991	Bob Dylan outtake
1997	Marchin' to the City	Dylan	The Bootleg Series Vol. 8: Tell Tale Signs	2008	Time Out of Mind outtake.
1988	Margarita	Dylan; Jeff Lynne; Tom Petty; Roy Orbison; George Harrison	Traveling Wilburys Vol. 1	1988	
N/A	Married to My Hack	Dylan, Costello	Unreleased	N/A	Lyrics written by Dylan during the Basement Tapes era. Finished, recorded and released in 2014 by The New Basement Tapes
1967	Mary Lou, I Love You Too	Dylan	The Bootleg Series Vol. 11: The Basement Tapes Complete	2014	
1995	Masquerade	Dylan, Gerry Goffin	Unreleased	N/A	Recorded by Gerry Goffin for his 1996 album Back Room Blood
1963	Masters of War	Dylan	The Freewheelin' Bob Dylan	1963	
N/A	Matthew Met Mary	Dylan, Elvis Costello	Unreleased	N/A	Played live eight times by Elvis Costello circa 2015
1990	Maxine	Dylan; Jeff Lynne; Tom Petty; George Harrison	The Traveling Wilburys Collection	2007	
1986	Maybe Someday	Dylan	Knocked Out Loaded	1986	
N/A	Mean Ol' Mississippi Blues	Dylan	Unreleased	N/A	Written in 1961. Exists in manuscript form only.
1965	Medicine Sunday	Dylan	The Bootleg Series Vol. 12: The Cutting Edge 1965–1966 Collector's Edition	2015	Early version of "Temporary Like Achilles"; Blonde on Blonde outtake
1974	Meet Me in the Morning	Dylan	Blood on the Tracks	1975	
1985	Meridian West	Dylan	1985	2024	Instrumental recorded with The Waterboys included in 95-track box set
1967	Million Dollar Bash	Dylan	The Basement Tapes	1975	
1997	Million Miles	Dylan	Time Out of Mind	1997	
1969	Minstrel Boy	Dylan	Self Portrait	1970	Live recording at the Isle of Wight Festival
2001	Mississippi	Dylan	Love and Theft	2001	
1962	Mixed-Up Confusion	Dylan	Biograph	1985	Single 1962
N/A	Money Blues	Dylan, Jacques Levy	Unreleased	N/A	Lyrics printed in Lyrics: 1962–1985, under Desire
2001	Moonlight	Dylan	Love and Theft	2001	
1966	Most Likely You Go Your Way And I'll Go Mine	Dylan	Blonde on Blonde	1966	
1989	Most of the Time	Dylan	Oh Mercy	1989	
2020	Mother of Muses	Dylan	Rough and Rowdy Ways	2020	
1964	Motorpsycho Nitemare	Dylan	Another Side of Bob Dylan	1964	
1981	Movin' (on the Water)	Dylan	Unreleased	N/A	Shot of Love outtake
1975	Mozambique	Dylan, Jacques Levy	Desire	1976	
1965	Mr. Tambourine Man	Dylan	Bringing It All Back Home	1965	
2020	Murder Most Foul	Dylan	Rough and Rowdy Ways	2020	Released online on March 26, 2020, described by Dylan as "an unreleased song we recorded a while back"
1964	My Back Pages	Dylan	Another Side of Bob Dylan	1964	
1981	My Oriental Home	Dylan	Unreleased	N/A	Shot of Love outtake
2020	My Own Version of You	Dylan	Rough and Rowdy Ways	2020	
1970	My Previous Life	Dylan	Unreleased	N/A	New Morning outtake, possibly not a Dylan composition
2008	My Wife's Home Town	Willie Dixon, Dylan, Robert Hunter	Together Through Life	2009	
1967	My Woman She's A-Leavin'	Dylan	The Bootleg Series Vol. 11: The Basement Tapes Complete	2014	
2012	Narrow Way	Dylan	Tempest	2012	
1969	Nashville Skyline Rag	Dylan	Nashville Skyline	1969	
N/A	Nasty Young Man	Dylan	Unreleased	N/A	Lyrical fragment housed in the Bob Dylan Archives in Tulsa
1981	Need a Woman	Dylan	The Bootleg Series Volumes 1–3 (Rare & Unreleased) 1961–1991	1991	Shot of Love outtake
1983	Neighborhood Bully	Dylan	Infidels	1983	
2006	Nettie Moore	Dylan	Modern Times	2006	
1985	Never Gonna Be the Same Again	Dylan	Empire Burlesque	1985	
1973	Never Say Goodbye	Dylan	Planet Waves	1974	
1990	New Blue Moon	Dylan, Jeff Lynne, Tom Petty, George Harrison	Traveling Wilburys Vol. 3	1990	
1985	New Danville Girl	Dylan, Sam Shepard	The Bootleg Series Vol. 16: Springtime in New York 1980–1985	2021	
1970	New Morning	Dylan	New Morning	1970	
2010	New Orleans Drums	Dylan	Unreleased	2010	Instrumental from the film My Own Love Song
1978	New Pony	Dylan	Street-Legal	1978	
1967	Next Time on the Highway	Dylan	The Bootleg Series Vol. 11: The Basement Tapes Complete	2014	"Big Pink" recording
1986	Night After Night	Dylan	Hearts of Fire	1986	
1978	No Time to Think	Dylan	Street-Legal	1978	
1973	Nobody 'Cept You	Dylan	The Bootleg Series Volumes 1–3 (Rare & Unreleased) 1961–1991	1991	Planet Waves outtake
1963	North Country Blues	Dylan	The Times They Are a-Changin'	1964	
1967	Northern Claim	Dylan	The Bootleg Series Vol. 11: The Basement Tapes Complete	2014	
1988	Not Alone Any More	Dylan; Jeff Lynne; Tom Petty; Roy Orbison; George Harrison	Traveling Wilburys Vol. 1	1988	
1997	Not Dark Yet	Dylan	Time Out of Mind	1997	
N/A	Nothing to It	Dylan, James	Unreleased	N/A	Lyrics written by Dylan during the Basement Tapes era. Finished, recorded and released in 2014 by The New Basement Tapes
1967	Nothing Was Delivered	Dylan	The Basement Tapes	1975	
1970	Nowhere to Go	Dylan, George Harrison	Unreleased	N/A	Recorded at Dylan's home in 1970 but unreleased
N/A	Number One	Dylan	Unreleased	N/A	Instrumental thought to be written in the mid-'60s, copyrighted 1971 by Dwarf Music
1966	Obviously 5 Believers	Dylan	Blonde on Blonde	1966	
1967	Odds and Ends	Dylan	The Basement Tapes	1975	
1975	Oh, Sister	Dylan, Jacques Levy	Desire	1976	
1973	On a Night Like This	Dylan	Planet Waves	1974	
1966	On a Rainy Afternoon	Dylan	The Bootleg Series Vol. 12: The Cutting Edge 1965–1966	2015	Glasgow hotel recording (NOTE: This is a different song than the 1967 "Big Pink" recording by the same title)
1967	On a Rainy Afternoon	Dylan	The Bootleg Series Vol. 11: The Basement Tapes Complete	2014	"Big Pink" recording (NOTE: This is a different song than the 1966 Glasgow hotel recording by the same title)
1981	On a Rocking Boat	Dylan	Unreleased	N/A	Shot of Love outtake
1965	On the Road Again	Dylan	Bringing It All Back Home	1965	
N/A	On, Wisconsin	Dylan, Trapper Schoepp	Unreleased	N/A	Song finished and recorded in 2018 for Trapper Schoepp's album Primetime Illusion
1960	One Eyed Jacks	Dylan	Unreleased	N/A	Recorded in 1960 but unreleased
1967	One for the Road	Dylan	The Bootleg Series Vol. 11: The Basement Tapes Complete	2014	"Big Pink" recording
1967	One Man's Loss	Dylan	The Bootleg Series Vol. 11: The Basement Tapes Complete	2014	"Big Pink" recording
1975	One More Cup of Coffee (Valley Below)	Dylan	Desire	1976	
1969	One More Night	Dylan	Nashville Skyline	1969	
1970	One More Weekend	Dylan	New Morning	1970	
1966	One of Us Must Know (Sooner or Later)	Dylan	Blonde on Blonde	1966	
1963	One Too Many Mornings	Dylan	The Times They Are a-Changin'	1964	
1963	Only a Hobo	Dylan	The Bootleg Series Volumes 1–3 (Rare & Unreleased) 1961–1991	1991	The Times They Are A-Changin' outtake.
1963	Only a Pawn in Their Game	Dylan	The Times They Are a-Changin'	1964	
1967	Open the Door, Homer	Dylan	The Basement Tapes	1975	
1965	Outlaw Blues	Dylan	Bringing It All Back Home	1965	
1963	Oxford Town	Dylan	The Freewheelin' Bob Dylan	1963	
1963	Paths of Victory	Dylan	The Bootleg Series Volumes 1–3 (Rare & Unreleased) 1961–1991	1991	The Times They Are A-Changin' outtake
1975	Patty's Gone to Laredo	Dylan	Unreleased	N/A	The song appears in the Dylan film Renaldo and Clara
2012	Pay in Blood	Dylan	Tempest	2012	
1973	Peco's Blues	Dylan	Unreleased	N/A	Pat Garrett & Billy the Kid outtake. Instrumental
1969	Peggy Day	Dylan	Nashville Skyline	1969	
1963	Percy's Song	Dylan	Biograph	1985	
1963	Playboys and Playgirls	Dylan	Newport Broadside, 1963	1964	Broadside recording session, Live duet with Pete Seeger at the 1963 Newport Folk Festival
1967	Please, Mrs. Henry	Dylan	The Basement Tapes	1975	
1966	Pledging My Time	Dylan	Blonde on Blonde	1966	
2001	Po' Boy	Dylan	Love and Theft	2001	
1989	Political World	Dylan	Oh Mercy	1989	
1962	Poor Boy Blues	Dylan	The Bootleg Series Vol. 9 – The Witmark Demos: 1962–1964	2010	
1990	Poor House	Dylan, Jeff Lynne, Tom Petty, George Harrison	Traveling Wilburys Vol. 3	1990	
1965	Positively 4th Street	Dylan	Bob Dylan's Greatest Hits	1967	single, 1965
1966	Positively Van Gogh	Dylan	The Bootleg Series Vol. 12: The Cutting Edge 1965–1966	2015	Recorded in a Denver hotel room, March 13, 1966, also known as "Definitely Van Gogh"
N/A	The Preacher's Folly	Dylan	Unreleased	N/A	Written in 1961. Exists in manuscript form only
1979	Precious Angel	Dylan	Slow Train Coming	1979	
1980	Pressing On	Dylan	Saved	1980	
1967	Pretty Mary	Dylan	The Bootleg Series Vol. 11: The Basement Tapes Complete	2014	
1981	Price of Love	Dylan	The Bootleg Series Vol. 16: Springtime in New York 1980–1985	2021	
1981	Property of Jesus	Dylan	Shot of Love	1981	
1965	Queen Jane Approximately	Dylan	Highway 61 Revisited	1965	
N/A	Quick Like a Flash	Dylan, James	Unreleased	N/A	Lyrics written by Dylan during the Basement Tapes era. Finished, recorded and released in 2014 by The New Basement Tapes
1967	Quinn the Eskimo (The Mighty Quinn)	Dylan	Biograph	1985	
1962	Quit Your Low Down Ways	Dylan	The Bootleg Series Volumes 1–3 (Rare & Unreleased) 1961–1991	1991	The Freewheelin' Bob Dylan outtake
1966	Rainy Day Women No. 12 & 35	Dylan	Blonde on Blonde	1966	
1963	Ramblin' Down Through the World	Dylan	The 50th Anniversary Collection 1963	2013	Performed live Town Hall, New York City, 12 April 1963
N/A	Ramblin' Gamblin' Blues	Dylan	Unreleased	N/A	Written in 1961. Exists in manuscript form only
1962	Rambling, Gambling Willie	Dylan	The Bootleg Series Volumes 1–3 (Rare & Unreleased) 1961–1991	1991	The Freewheelin' Bob Dylan outtake
1988	Rattled	Dylan; Jeff Lynne; Tom Petty; Roy Orbison; George Harrison	Traveling Wilburys Vol. 1	1988	
1997	Red River Shore	Dylan	The Bootleg Series Vol. 8: Tell Tale Signs: Rare and Unreleased 1989–2006	2008	Time Out of Mind outtake.
N/A	Red Travelin' Shoes	Dylan	Unreleased	N/A	Written in 1961. Exists in manuscript form only
1978	Responsibility	Dylan, Helena Springs	Unreleased	N/A	Recorded in 1978 but unreleased
1963	Restless Farewell	Dylan	The Times They Are a-Changin'	1964	
1986	Ride This Train	Dylan	Unreleased	N/A	Recorded in 1986 but unreleased (NOTE: Different song than Riding on the Train played live the same year)
N/A	Riding on the Train	Dylan	Unreleased	N/A	Played live in 1986 but never released (NOTE: Different song than Ride This Train recorded the same year)
1989	Ring Them Bells	Dylan	Oh Mercy	1989	
1976	Rita May	Dylan, Jacques Levy	Masterpieces	1978	single, 1976
1973	River Theme	Dylan	Pat Garrett & Billy the Kid	1973	
2010	Road Weary	Dylan	Unreleased	2010	Instrumental from the film My Own Love Song
2010	Robbie Robert's Lament	Dylan	Unreleased	2010	Instrumental from the film My Own Love Song
N/A	Rockin' Chair	Dylan	Unreleased	N/A	Written in 1961. Exists in manuscript form only
1962	Rocks and Gravel	Dylan	Live at the Gaslight 1962	2005	
N/A	Rocky Mountain Belle #2	Dylan	Unreleased	N/A	Written in 1961. Exists in manuscript form only.
2006	Rollin' and Tumblin'	Dylan	Modern Times	2006	
2012	Roll on John	Dylan	Tempest	2012	
1967	Roll on Train	Dylan	The Bootleg Series Vol. 11: The Basement Tapes Complete	2014	
1975	Romance in Durango	Dylan, Jacques Levy	Desire	1976	
N/A	Round and Round We Go	Dylan	Unreleased	N/A	Fragment printed in A. J. Weberman's autobiography, A Life in Garbology
1969	Running	Dylan	50th Anniversary Collection 1969	2019	
1966	Sad Eyed Lady of the Lowlands	Dylan	Blonde on Blonde	1966	
1962	Sally Gal	Dylan	The Bootleg Series Vol. 7: No Direction Home: The Soundtrack	2005	The Freewheelin' Bob Dylan Outtake
1967	Santa Cruz	Dylan, Elvis Costello	Unreleased		Unrecorded but performed live by Elvis Costello
1967	Santa-Fe	Dylan	The Bootleg Series Volumes 1–3 (Rare & Unreleased) 1961–1991	1991	"Big Pink" recording
1975	Sara	Dylan	Desire	1976	
1970	Sarah Jane	Dylan	Dylan	1973	New Morning outtake
1980	Saved	Dylan, Tim Drummond	Saved	1980	
1980	Saving Grace	Dylan	Saved	1980	
2012	Scarlet Town	Dylan	Tempest	2012	
1985	Seeing the Real You at Last	Dylan	Empire Burlesque	1985	
1967	See You Later Allen Ginsberg	Dylan	The Bootleg Series Vol. 11: The Basement Tapes Complete	2014	
1978	Senor (Tales of Yankee Power)	Dylan	Street-Legal	1978	
1989	Series of Dreams	Dylan	The Bootleg Series Vol. 8: Tell Tale Signs	2008	Oh Mercy Outtake
1963	Seven Curses	Dylan	The Bootleg Series Volumes 1–3 (Rare & Unreleased) 1961–1991	1991	The Times They Are A-Changin' outtake.
1976	Seven Days	Dylan	The Bootleg Series Volumes 1–3 (Rare & Unreleased) 1961–1991	1991	Live performance, Tampa, Florida
N/A	Shake	Dylan	Unreleased	N/A	Played live in 1985 but unrecorded
2008	Shake Shake Mama	Dylan, Robert Hunter	Together Through Life	2009	
1965	She Belongs to Me	Dylan	Bringing It All Back Home	1965	
1990	She's My Baby	Dylan; Jeff Lynne; Tom Petty; George Harrison	Traveling Wilburys Vol. 3	1990	
1967	She's on My Mind Again	Dylan	The Bootleg Series Vol. 11: The Basement Tapes Complete	2014	
1966	She's Your Lover Now	Dylan	The Bootleg Series Volumes 1–3 (Rare & Unreleased) 1961–1991	1991	Blonde on Blonde outtake
1974	Shelter from the Storm	Dylan	Blood on the Tracks	1975	
1990	Shirley Temple Don't Live Here Anymore	Dylan, Don Was; David Was	Unreleased	N/A	Recorded by Was (Not Was) for their 2008 album, Boo! Under the title, "Mr. Alice Doesn't Live Here Anymore"
N/A	Shirley's Room	Dylan	Unreleased	N/A	Lyric written in 1970 and auctioned in 1992
1989	Shooting Star	Dylan	Oh Mercy	1989	
1981	Shot of Love	Dylan	Shot of Love	1981	
2021	Sierra's Theme	Dylan	Shadow Kingdom	2023	
1976	Sign Language	Dylan	No Reason to Cry (Eric Clapton album)	1976	Duet with Eric Clapton
1967	Sign on the Cross	Dylan	The Bootleg Series Vol. 11: The Basement Tapes Complete	2014	"Big Pink" recording
1970	Sign on the Window	Dylan	New Morning	1970	
1967	Silent Weekend	Dylan	The Bootleg Series Vol. 11: The Basement Tapes Complete	2014	"Big Pink" recording
1983/7	Silvio	Dylan, Robert Hunter	Down in the Groove	1988	
1974	Simple Twist of Fate	Dylan	Blood on the Tracks	1975	
1965	Sitting on a Barbed Wire Fence	Dylan	The Bootleg Series Volumes 1–3 (Rare & Unreleased) 1961–1991	1991	Highway 61 Revisited outtake
N/A	Six Months in Kansas City (Liberty Street)	Dylan, Costello	Unreleased	N/A	Lyrics written by Dylan during the Basement Tapes era. Finished, recorded and released in 2014 by The New Basement Tapes
1979	Slow Train	Dylan	Slow Train Coming	1979	
2010	Snow Falling	Dylan	Unreleased	2010	Instrumental from the film My Own Love Song
1980	Solid Rock	Dylan	Saved	1980	
2006	Someday Baby	Dylan	Modern Times	2006	
1983	Someone's Got a Hold of My Heart	Dylan	The Bootleg Series Volumes 1–3 (Rare & Unreleased) 1961–1991	1991	Early version of the song Tight Connection to My Heart from Empire Burlesque
1973	Something There Is About You	Dylan	Planet Waves	1974	
1985	Something's Burning, Baby	Dylan	Empire Burlesque	1985	
N/A	Song to Bonny	Dylan	Unreleased	N/A	
N/A	Song to Brigit	Dylan	Unreleased	N/A	A "lost song" supposedly written in 1957
1961	Song to Woody	Dylan	Bob Dylan	1962	
2012	Soon After Midnight	Dylan	Tempest	2012	
1964	Spanish Harlem Incident	Dylan	Another Side of Bob Dylan	1964	
N/A	Spanish Mary	Dylan, Giddens	Unreleased	N/A	Lyrics written by Dylan during the Basement Tapes era. Finished, recorded and released in 2014 by The New Basement Tapes
1967	The Spanish Song	Dylan	The Bootleg Series Vol. 11: The Basement Tapes Complete	2014	"Big Pink" recording
2006	Spirit on the Water	Dylan	Modern Times	2006	
1979	Stand By Faith	Dylan	The Bootleg Series Vol. 13: Trouble No More 1979–1981	2017	
1997	Standing in the Doorway	Dylan	Time Out of Mind	1997	
1962	Standing on the Highway	Dylan	The Bootleg Series Vol. 9 – The Witmark Demos: 1962–1964	2010	
N/A	Steel and Feathers (Don't Ever)	Dylan, Nikki Jean	Unreleased	N/A	Song completed by Nikki Jean for her 2011 album Pennies in a Jar
1991	Steel Bars	Dylan, Michael Bolton	Unreleased	N/A	Recorded by Michael Bolton for his 1991 album Time, Love & Tenderness
1964	Stoned on the Mountain	Dylan, Eric Von Schmidt	Unreleased	N/A	Recorded in 1964 but unreleased
1978	Stop Now	Dylan, Helena Springs	Unreleased	N/A	Recorded in 1978 but unreleased
1985	Straight A's in Love	Dylan	Unreleased	N/A	Recorded in 1985 but unreleased
N/A	Strange Rain	Dylan	Unreleased	N/A	Rumored to have been written in 1961
N/A	Stranger	Dylan, Mumford	Unreleased	N/A	Lyrics written by Dylan during the Basement Tapes era. Finished, recorded and released in 2014 by The New Basement Tapes
1966	Stuck Inside of Mobile with the Memphis Blues Again	Dylan	Blonde on Blonde	1966	
1965	Subterranean Homesick Blues	Dylan	Bringing It All Back Home	1965	
2001	Sugar Baby	Dylan	Love and Theft	2001	
2001	Summer Days	Dylan	Love and Theft	2001	
1963	Suze (The Cough Song)	Dylan	The Bootleg Series Volumes 1–3 (Rare & Unreleased) 1961–1991	1991	The Times They Are A-Changin' outtake.
2010	Sweeping the Floor	Dylan	Unreleased	2010	Instrumental from the film My Own Love Song
N/A	Sweet Amarillo	Dylan, Ketch Secor	Unreleased	N/A	Unfinished song from the Pat Garrett & Billy the Kid sessions, finished by Secor and released on the 2014 Old Crow Medicine Show album REMEDY.
1983	Sweetheart Like You	Dylan	Infidels	1983	
2010	Swingin'	Dylan	Unreleased	2010	Instrumental from the film My Own Love Song
1978	Take It or Leave It	Dylan	Unreleased	N/A	Rehearsed in 1978 but unrecorded
1962	Talkin' Bear Mountain Picnic Massacre Blues	Dylan	The Bootleg Series Volumes 1–3 (Rare & Unreleased) 1961–1991	1991	The Freewheelin' Bob Dylan outtake
1963	Talkin' Devil	Dylan	Broadside Ballads, Vol 1	1964	Released under the pseudonym Blind Boy Grunt
1962	Talkin' Folklore Center	Dylan	Unreleased	N/A	Performed live Gerde's Folk City
1962	Talkin' Hava Negeilah Blues	Dylan	The Bootleg Series Volumes 1–3 (Rare & Unreleased) 1961–1991	1991	The Freewheelin' Bob Dylan outtake
1960	Talkin' Hugh Brown	Dylan	Unreleased	N/A	Minneapolis tape
1962	Talkin' Hypocrite	Dylan	Unreleased	N/A	Performed Tony Glover's, Minneapolis
1963	Talkin' John Birch Paranoid Blues	Dylan	The Bootleg Series Volumes 1–3 (Rare & Unreleased) 1961–1991	1991	Live at Carnegie Hall
1961	Talkin' New York	Dylan	Bob Dylan	1962	
1963	Talkin' World War III Blues	Dylan	The Freewheelin' Bob Dylan	1963	
1974	Tangled Up in Blue	Dylan	Blood on the Tracks	1975	
1967	Tears of Rage	Dylan, Richard Manuel	The Basement Tapes	1975	
1970	Telephone Wire	Dylan	1970	1970	
1983	Tell Me	Dylan	The Bootleg Series Volumes 1–3 (Rare & Unreleased) 1961–1991	1991	Infidels outtake
1966	Tell Me Momma	Dylan	The Bootleg Series Vol. 4: Bob Dylan Live 1966, The "Royal Albert Hall" Concert	2004	
1969	Tell Me That It Isn't True	Dylan	Nashville Skyline	1969	
2005	Tell Ol' Bill	Dylan	The Bootleg Series Vol. 8: Tell Tale Signs	2008	
2012	Tempest	Dylan	Tempest	2012	
1966	Temporary Like Achilles	Dylan	Blonde on Blonde	1966	
N/A	That California Side	Dylan	Unreleased	N/A	Lyrics published in Isis
1967	That's the Breaks	Dylan	The Bootleg Series Vol. 11: The Basement Tapes Complete	2014	
N/A	There Ain't Gonna Be a Next Time	Dylan	Unreleased	N/A	
1981	Thief on the Cross	Dylan	The Bootleg Series Vol. 13: Trouble No More 1979–1981	2017	
1999	Things Have Changed	Dylan	The Best of Bob Dylan, Vol. 2	2000	
1978	This A-Way That A-Way	Dylan	Unreleased	N/A	Rehearsed in 1978 but unreleased
2008	This Dream of You	Dylan	Together Through Life	2009	
1967	This Wheel's on Fire	Dylan, Rick Danko	The Basement Tapes	1975	
1970	Three Angels	Dylan	New Morning	1970	
2006	Thunder on the Mountain	Dylan	Modern Times	2006	
1985	Tight Connection to My Heart (Has Anybody Seen My Love)	Dylan	Empire Burlesque	1985	
1970	Time Passes Slowly	Dylan	New Morning	1970	
1963	The Times They Are a-Changin'	Dylan	The Times They Are a-Changin'	1964	
2012	Tin Angel	Dylan	Tempest	2012	
1967	Tiny Montgomery	Dylan	The Basement Tapes	1975	
1987	Tioga Pass	Dylan, Robert Hunter	Unreleased	N/A	Recorded in 1987 but unreleased
1969	To Be Alone with You	Dylan	Nashville Skyline	1969	
1986	To Fall in Love with You	Dylan	Unreleased	N/A	Recorded during Hearts of Fire but unreleased
1964	To Ramona	Dylan	Another Side of Bob Dylan	1964	
1965	Tombstone Blues	Dylan	Highway 61 Revisited	1965	
1964	Tomorrow Is a Long Time	Dylan	Bob Dylan's Greatest Hits Vol. II	1971	Live recording at the Town Hall on April 12, 1963
1969	Tonight I'll Be Staying Here with You	Dylan	Nashville Skyline	1969	
1967	Too Much of Nothing	Dylan	The Basement Tapes	1975	
N/A	Touchy Situation	Dylan, Jack Savoretti	Unreleased	N/A	Dylan lyric finished by Savoretti and released on his 2019 album Singing to Strangers
1973	Tough Mama	Dylan	Planet Waves	1974	
1995	Tragedy of the Trade	Dylan, Gerry Goffin; Barry Goldberg	Unreleased	N/A	Recorded by Gerry Goffin for his 1996 album Back Room Blood
1962	Train A-Travelin'	Dylan	Unreleased	N/A	Broadside recording session.
1981	Trouble	Dylan	Shot of Love	1981	
1979	Trouble in Mind	Dylan	The Bootleg Series Vol. 13: Trouble No More 1979–1981	2017	
1963	Troubled and I Don't Know Why	Dylan	Rare, Live & Classic (Joan Baez album)	1993	Live recording with Joan Baez at Forest Hills, New York, 17 August 1963
1978	True Love Tends to Forget	Dylan	Street-Legal	1978	
1985	Trust Yourself	Dylan	Empire Burlesque	1985	
1967	Try Me Little Girl	Dylan	The Bootleg Series Vol. 11: The Basement Tapes Complete	2014	"Big Pink" recording
1997	Tryin' to Get to Heaven	Dylan	Time Out of Mind	1997	
1973	Turkey II (Tom Turkey)	Dylan	1973: 50th Anniversary Copyright Collection	2023	Pat Garrett & Billy the Kid outtake. Released on Bob Dylan 1973: 50th Anniversary Copyright Collection.
1973	Turkey Chase	Dylan	Pat Garrett & Billy the Kid	1973	
1990	T.V. Talkin' Song	Dylan	Under the Red Sky	1990	
2001	Tweedle Dee & Tweedle Dum	Dylan	Love and Theft	2001	
1988	Tweeter and the Monkey Man	Dylan; Jeff Lynne; Tom Petty; Roy Orbison; George Harrison	Traveling Wilburys Vol. 1	1988	
1983/7	Ugliest Girl in the World	Dylan, Robert Hunter	Down in the Groove	1988	
1990	Unbelievable	Dylan	Under the Red Sky	1990	
1967	Under Control	Dylan	The Bootleg Series Vol. 11: The Basement Tapes Complete	2014	"Big Pink" recording
1990	Under the Red Sky	Dylan	Under the Red Sky	1990	
1986	Under Your Spell	Dylan, Carole Bayer Sager	Knocked Out Loaded	1986	
1983	Union Sundown	Dylan	Infidels	1983	
1970	Untitled 1970 Instrumental #1	Dylan	1970	2021	
1970	Untitled 1970 Instrumental #2	Dylan	1970	2021	
1973	Untitled 1973 Instrumental No. 1	Dylan	1973: 50th Anniversary Copyright Collection	2023	Pat Garrett & Billy the Kid outtake. Released on Bob Dylan 1973: 50th Anniversary Copyright Collection.
1973	Untitled 1973 Instrumental No. 2	Dylan	1973: 50th Anniversary Copyright Collection	2023	Pat Garrett & Billy the Kid outtake. Released on Bob Dylan 1973: 50th Anniversary Copyright Collection.
1974	Up to Me	Dylan	Biograph	1985	
1985	The Very Thought of You	Dylan	Unreleased	1985	Recorded in 1985 but unreleased
1965	Visions of Johanna	Dylan	Blonde on Blonde	1966	
1971	Vomit Express	Dylan, Allen Ginsberg	Unreleased	1983	Released on Ginsberg's First Blues album in 1983
1973	Wagon Wheel	Dylan	Unreleased	N/A	Pat Garrett & Billy the Kid outtake; finished by Ketch Secor and released on Old Crow Medicine Show's 2004 self-titled album.
1991	Waiting for the Morning Light	Dylan, Gene Simmons	Unreleased	N/A	Appeared on Simmons' 2004 album Asshole
2002	Waiting for You	Dylan	Divine Secrets of the Ya-Ya Sisterhood OST	2002	
1985	Waiting To Get Beat	Dylan	Unreleased	N/A	Recorded in 1985 but unreleased; covered by Tea Leaf Green
N/A	Walk Out in the Rain	Dylan, Helena Springs	Unreleased	N/A	Recorded by Eric Clapton for his 1978 album Backless
1963	Walkin' Down the Line	Dylan	The Bootleg Series Volumes 1–3 (Rare & Unreleased) 1961–1991	1994	Witmark publishing demo
1971	Wallflower	Dylan	The Bootleg Series Volumes 1–3 (Rare & Unreleased) 1961–1991	1994	
1963	Walls of Red Wing	Dylan	The Bootleg Series Volumes 1–3 (Rare & Unreleased) 1961–1991	1994	The Freewheelin' Bob Dylan outtake
N/A	The Wandering Kind	Dylan, Helena Springs	Unreleased	N/A	Recorded by Paul Butterfield for his 1986 album The Legendary Paul Butterfield Rides Again
1969	Wanted Man	Dylan	Unreleased	N/A	Recorded by Johnny Cash for his At San Quentin album. A demo featuring a duet by Cash and Dylan was released on The Bootleg Series Vol. 15: Travelin' Thru, 1967–1969.
1971	Watching the River Flow	Dylan	Bob Dylan's Greatest Hits Vol. II	1971	single
1981	Watered Down Love	Dylan	Shot of Love	1981	
1978	We Better Talk This Over	Dylan	Street-Legal	1978	
1973	Wedding Song	Dylan	Planet Waves	1974	
N/A	Well Well Well	Dylan, Danny O'Keefe	Unreleased	N/A	Recorded by Danny O'Keefe for his 2000 album Runnin' From the Devil
1970	Went to See the Gypsy	Dylan	New Morning	1970	
1969	Western Road	Dylan	The Bootleg Series Vol. 15: Travelin' Thru, 1967–1969	2019	
1980	What Can I Do for You?	Dylan	Saved	1980	
1989	What Good Am I?	Dylan	Oh Mercy	1989	
1966	What Kind of Friend Is This	Dylan	The Bootleg Series Vol. 12: The Cutting Edge 1965–1966	2015	
1989	What Was It You Wanted	Dylan	Oh Mercy	1989	
1975	What Will You Do When Jesus Comes?	Dylan	Bob Dylan – The Rolling Thunder Revue: The 1975 Live Recordings	2019	
1967	What's it Gonna Be When it Comes Up	Dylan	The Bootleg Series Vol. 11: The Basement Tapes Complete	2014	
1962	Whatcha Gonna Do	Dylan	The Bootleg Series Vol. 9 – The Witmark Demos: 1962–1964	2010	
1979	When He Returns	Dylan	Slow Train Coming	1979	
N/A	When I Get My Hands on You	Dylan, Mumford, Goldsmith	Unreleased	N/A	Lyrics written by Dylan during the Basement Tapes era. Finished, recorded and released in 2014 by The New Basement Tapes
1959	When I Got Troubles	Dylan	The Bootleg Series Vol. 7: No Direction Home: The Soundtrack	2005	Recorded by Dylan's high school friend Ric Kangas
1971	When I Paint My Masterpiece	Dylan	Bob Dylan's Greatest Hits Vol. II	1971	
2006	When the Deal Goes Down	Dylan	Modern Times	2006	
1985	When the Night Comes Falling from the Sky	Dylan	Empire Burlesque	1985	
1963	When the Ship Comes In	Dylan	The Times They Are a-Changin'	1964	
1979	When You Gonna Wake Up	Dylan	Slow Train Coming	1979	
N/A	When You Walked Away	Dylan	Unreleased	N/A	Lyric fragment printed in Isis
1978	Where Are You Tonight? (Journey Through Dark Heat)	Dylan	Street-Legal	1978	
1989	Where Teardrops Fall	Dylan	Oh Mercy	1989	
1990	Where Were You Last Night?	Dylan, Jeff Lynne, Tom Petty, George Harrison	Traveling Wilburys Vol. 3	1990	
N/A	The Whistle Is Blowing	Dylan, Mumford	Unreleased	N/A	Lyrics written by Dylan during the Basement Tapes era. Finished, recorded and released in 2014 by The New Basement Tapes
1963	Who Killed Davey Moore?	Dylan	The Bootleg Series Volumes 1–3 (Rare & Unreleased) 1961–1991	1991	Live at Carnegie Hall
1984	Who Loves You More?	Dylan	Unreleased	N/A	Recorded during Empire Burlesque sessions but unreleased
1967	The Wicked Messenger	Dylan	John Wesley Harding	1967	
1990	Wiggle Wiggle	Dylan	Under the Red Sky	1990	
1969/70	Wigwam	Dylan	Self Portrait	1970	
1990	Wilbury Twist	Dylan; Jeff Lynne; Tom Petty; George Harrison	Traveling Wilburys Vol. 3	1990	
1967	Wild Wolf	Dylan	The Bootleg Series Vol. 11: The Basement Tapes Complete	2014	Copyrighted in 1973 by Dylan's publishing company Dwarf Music
1981	Wind Blows on the Water	Dylan	Unreleased	N/A	Recorded during Shot of Love sessions but unreleased
1970	Winterlude	Dylan	New Morning	1970	
1963	With God on Our Side	Dylan	The Times They Are a-Changin'	1964	
1985	Won't Go Back 'Til They Call Me Back Again	Dylan	Unreleased	N/A	Recorded in 1985 but unreleased
N/A	Won't You Buy My Postcard?	Dylan	Unreleased	N/A	Rumored to have been written in 1961
1969/70	Woogie Boogie	Dylan	Self Portrait	1970	
2006	Workingman's Blues #2	Dylan	Modern Times	2006	
1971	Working on a Guru	Dylan	The Bootleg Series Vol. 10 – Another Self Portrait (1969–1971)	2013	New Morning outtake
N/A	Worth the Waiting For	Dylan, David A. Stewart	Unreleased	N/A	Appears on David Stewart's 2011 album The Blackbird Diaries
1979	Ye Shall Be Changed	Dylan	The Bootleg Series Volumes 1–3 (Rare & Unreleased) 1961–1991	1991	Slow Train Coming outtake
1967	Yea! Heavy and a Bottle of Bread	Dylan	The Basement Tapes	1975	
1981	Yes Sir, No Sir	Dylan	The Bootleg Series Vol. 16: Springtime in New York 1980–1985	2021	
1980	Yonder Comes Sin	Dylan	The Bootleg Series Vol. 13: Trouble No More 1979–1981	2017	
1967	You Ain't Goin' Nowhere	Dylan	The Basement Tapes	1975	Re-recording in 1971 for Bob Dylan's Greatest Hits Vol. II
1973	You Angel You	Dylan	Planet Waves	1974	
1987	You Can Blow My Mind (If You Want To)	Dylan, Britta Lee Shain	Unreleased	N/A	
N/A	You Can Change Your Name	Dylan	Unreleased	N/A	Played for Al Aronowitz in 1967 but presumed unrecorded
1981	You Changed My Life	Dylan	The Bootleg Series Volumes 1–3 (Rare & Unreleased) 1961–1991	1991	Shot of Love outtake
1965	You Don't Have to Do That	Dylan	The Bootleg Series Vol. 12: The Cutting Edge 1965–1966	2015	
1978	You Don't Love Me No More	Dylan	Unreleased	N/A	
N/A	You Don't Say	Dylan	Unreleased	N/A	Mentioned in an interview with Jeff Slate as being written during "lockdown" (2020–2022)
N/A	You Own a Racehorse	Dylan	Unreleased	N/A	Copyrighted by Dylan's publishing company Special Rider
1990	You Took My Breath Away	Dylan, Jeff Lynne, Tom Petty, George Harrison	Traveling Wilburys Vol. 3	1990	
1974	You're a Big Girl Now	Dylan	Blood on the Tracks	1975	
1974	You're Gonna Make Me Lonesome When You Go	Dylan	Blood on the Tracks	1975	
1981	You're Still a Child to Me	Dylan	Unreleased	N/A	
N/A	Zebra	Dylan	Unreleased	N/A	Lyrics to a Highway 61 Revisited era song held at The Bob Dylan Archive

== See also ==
- List of Bob Dylan songs based on earlier tunes
- List of artists who have covered Bob Dylan songs
