= The 50th Anniversary Collection 1963 =

50th Anniversary Collection 1963

Compilation album by Bob Dylan
- Released: November 2013
- Recorded: February 8 – October 26, 1963
- Genre: Folk
- Length: 288:10
- Label: Sony Music Entertainment
- Producers: John H. Hammond; Tom Wilson

Bob Dylan chronology
The Very Best of Bob Dylan (2013)	50th Anniversary Collection 1963 (2013)	The Bootleg Series Vol. 11: The Basement Tapes Complete (2014)

The 50th Anniversary Collection 1963 is the second Bob Dylan collection released by Sony Music to prevent the recordings from legally entering the public domain in Europe. Released on vinyl only in November 2013, only 100 copies of the six-LP set were produced.

== Track listing ==
LP 1—Side A
No.	Title	Length
1.	"Eternal Circle" (Take 4, The Times They Are a-Changin' sessions, 12 August 1963)	2:57
2.	"Percy's Song" (Take 1, The Times They Are a-Changin sessions, 23 October 1963)	7:12
3.	"That's Alright Mama"/"Sally Free and Easy"" (Take 1, The Times They Are a-Changin sessions, 23 October 1963)	3:12
4.	"Hero Blues" (Take 3, The Times They Are a-Changin sessions, 12 August 1963)	3:46
5.	"East Laredo Blues" (Take 1, The Times They Are a-Changin sessions, 23 October 1963)	3:07
6.	"Bob Dylan's New Orleans Rag" (Take 2, The Times They Are a-Changin sessions, 24 October 1963)	3:23
Total length:		23:37

LP 1—Side B
No.	Title	Length
1.	"Lonesome River Edge" (Live, 8 February 1963, Gerde's Folk City)	0:45
2.	"Back Door Blues" (Live, 8 February 1963, Gerde's Folk City)	1:40
3.	"Bob Dylan's Dream" (Live, 8 February 1963, Gerde's Folk City)	3:42
4.	"You Can Get Her" (Live, 8 February 1963, Gerde's Folk City)	1:08
5.	"Farewell" (Live, 8 February 1963, Gerde's Folk City)	2:26
6.	"All Over You" (Live, 8 February 1963, Gerde's Folk City)	3:44
7.	"Masters of War" (Live, 8 February 1963, Gerde's Folk City)	5:42
8.	"Instrumental Jam" (Live, 8 February 1963, Gerde's Folk City)	1:07
9.	"Keep Your Hands Off Her" (Live, 8 February 1963, Gerde's Folk City)	1:30
10.	"Honey Babe" (Live, 8 February 1963, Gerde's Folk City)	0:55
11.	"Going Back to Rome" (Live, 8 February 1963, Gerde's Folk City)	1:43
12.	"Stealin'" (Live, 8 February 1963, Gerde's Folk City)	1:19
Total length:		25:41

LP 2—Side A
No.	Title	Length
1.	"Ballad of Hollis Brown" (Folk Songs and More Folk Songs TV Special, 3 March 1963)	4:59
2.	"Girl from the North Country" (The Oscar Brand Show, March 1963)	3:02
3.	"Only a Hobo" (The Oscar Brand Show, March 1963)	2:10
4.	"Ramblin' Down Through the World" (Live, Town Hall, New York City, 12 April 1963)	2:11
5.	"Bob Dylan's Dream" (Live, Town Hall, New York City, 12 April 1963)	4:34
6.	"Talkin' New York" (Live, Town Hall, New York City, 12 April 1963)	3:23
7.	"Hiding Too Long" (Live, Town Hall, New York City, 12 April 1963)	2:25
Total length:		22:44

LP 2—Side B
No.	Title	Length
1.	"Ballad of Hollis Brown" (Live, Town Hall, New York City, 12 April 1963)	5:28
2.	"Walls of Red Wing" (Live, Town Hall, New York City, 12 April 1963)	5:43
3.	"All Over You" (Live, Town Hall, New York City, 12 April 1963)	4:04
4.	"Talkin' John Birch Paranoid Blues" (Live, Town Hall, New York City, 12 April 1963)	3:47
5.	"Boots of Spanish Leather" (Live, Town Hall, New York City, 12 April 1963)	4:49
Total length:		23:51

LP 3—Side A
No.	Title	Length
1.	"Hero Blues" (Live, Town Hall, New York City, 12 April 1963)	2:40
2.	"John Brown" (Live, Town Hall, New York City, 12 April 1963)	5:23
3.	"A Hard Rain's a-Gonna Fall" (Live, Town Hall, New York City, 12 April 1963)	7:36
4.	"Dusty Old Fairgrounds" (Live, Town Hall, New York City, 12 April 1963)	5:06
5.	"Who Killed Davey Moore?" (Live, Town Hall, New York City, 12 April 1963)	3:25
Total length:		24:10

LP 3—Side B
No.	Title	Length
1.	"Seven Curses" (Live, Town Hall, New York City, 12 April 1963)	5:16
2.	"Highway 51" (Live, Town Hall, New York City, 12 April 1963)	4:00
3.	"Pretty Peggy-O" (Live, Town Hall, New York City, 12 April 1963)	3:18
4.	"Bob Dylan's New Orleans Rag" (Live, Town Hall, New York City, 12 April 1963)	3:02
5.	"Don't Think Twice, It's All Right" (Live, Town Hall, New York City, 12 April 1963)	3:37
6.	"With God on Our Side" (Live, Town Hall, New York City, 12 April 1963)	6:00
Total length:		25:13

LP 4—Side A
No.	Title	Length
1.	"James Alley Blues" (The Home of Eve and Mac McKenzie, 18 April 1963)	2:42
2.	"Long Time Ago" (The Home of Eve and Mac McKenzie, 18 April 1963)	3:09
3.	"Only a Hobo" (The Home of Eve and Mac McKenzie, 18 April 1963)	2:22
4.	"Blues Jam" (The Home of Eve and Mac McKenzie, 18 April 1963)	2:12
5.	"A Hard Rain's a-Gonna Fall" (The Home of Eve and Mac McKenzie, 18 April 1963)	7:08
6.	"Honey, Just Allow Me One More Chance" (Live, The Bear Folk Club, Chicago, 25 April 1963)	1:54
7.	"Talkin' John Birch Paranoid Blues" (Live, The Bear Folk Club, Chicago, 25 April 1963)	3:50
Total length:		23:17

LP 4—Side B
No.	Title	Length
1.	"Bob Dylan's Dream" (Live, The Bear Folk Club, Chicago, 25 April 1963)	3:42
2.	"Ballad of Hollis Brown" (Live, The Bear Folk Club, Chicago, 25 April 1963)	5:03
3.	"Talkin' World War III Blues" (Live, The Bear Folk Club, Chicago, 25 April 1963)	5:07
4.	"A Hard Rain's a-Gonna Fall" (Live, The Bear Folk Club, Chicago, 25 April 1963)	7:28
5.	"With God on Our Side" (Live, The Bear Folk Club, Chicago, 25 April 1963)	4:26
Total length:		25:46

LP 5—Side A
No.	Title	Length
1.	"Farewell" (Studs Terkel Wax Museum, 26 April 1963)	2:48
2.	"A Hard Rain's a-Gonna Fall" (Studs Terkel Wax Museum, 26 April 1963)	6:57
3.	"Bob Dylan's Dream" (Studs Terkel Wax Museum, 26 April 1963)	3:44
4.	"Boots of Spanish Leather" (Studs Terkel Wax Museum, 26 April 1963)	4:45
5.	"John Brown" (Studs Terkel Wax Museum, 26 April 1963)	4:47
Total length:		23:01

LP 5—Side B
No.	Title	Length
1.	"Who Killed Davey Moore?" (Studs Terkel Wax Museum, 26 April 1963)	3:14
2.	"Blowin' in the Wind" (Studs Terkel Wax Museum, 26 April 1963)	2:48
3.	"Blowin' in the Wind" (Songs of Freedom TV show, New York City, 30 July 1963)	3:00
4.	"Only a Pawn in Their Game" (Songs of Freedom TV show, New York City, 30 July 1963)	3:35
5.	"When the Ship Comes In" (Live, March on Washington, 28 August 1963)	3:17
6.	"Only a Pawn in Their Game" (Live, March on Washington, 28 August 1963)	3:21
Total length:		19:15

LP 6—Side A
No.	Title	Length
1.	"Blowin' in the Wind" (Live, Carnegie Hall, New York City, 26 October 1963)	3:32
2.	"Percy's Song" (Live, Carnegie Hall, New York City, 26 October 1963)	8:48
3.	"Seven Curses" (Live, Carnegie Hall, New York City, 26 October 1963)	4:11
4.	"Walls of Red Wing" (Live, Carnegie Hall, New York City, 26 October 1963)	3:55
Total length:		27:04

LP 6—Side B
No.	Title	Length
1.	"Talkin' World War III Blues" (Live, Carnegie Hall, New York City, 26 October 1963)	4:51
2.	"Don't Think Twice, It's All Right" (Live, Carnegie Hall, New York City, 26 October 1963)	4:18
3.	"Only a Pawn in Their Game" (Live, Carnegie Hall, New York City, 26 October 1963)	3:53
4.	"Masters of War" (Live, Carnegie Hall, New York City, 26 October 1963)	2:53
5.	"The Lonesome Death of Hattie Carroll" (Live, Carnegie Hall, New York City, 26 October 1963)	5:15
Total length:		24:31
