= The Very Best of Bob Dylan =

Greatest hits album by Bob Dylan
- Released: November 4, 2013
- Genre: Rock; proto-rap; folk
- Length: 97:00
- Label: Sony Music

Bob Dylan chronology
Bob Dylan: The Complete Album Collection Vol. One (2013)	The Very Best of Bob Dylan (2013)	The 50th Anniversary Collection 1963 (2013)

The Very Best of Bob Dylan is a compilation album the American singer-songwriter Bob Dylan released in 2013. That same day the compilation was reissued with an extra disc.

== Reception ==
Professional ratings
Review scores
Source	Rating
AllMusic	4/5 stars

In a review of the album on AllMusic, music critic Mark Deming states that "Giving an album the title The Very Best of Bob Dylan is, more than anything else, a good way to start an argument; given the remarkable scope of Dylan's 50-year recording career, trying to reduce the high points of his body of work to one 18-song set is guaranteed to generate lively (or even hostile) debate among his many fans." and that "For its first 14 tracks, The Very Best of Bob Dylan delivers a stellar lineup of the songwriter's most iconic compositions, and while you can argue whether these tracks are really Dylan at his very best, from "Blowin' in the Wind" to "Hurricane," these are songs that truly changed the shape of popular songwriting, and they retain their power all these years later." and also that "perhaps this isn't literally the Very Best of Bob Dylan, but this music shows why Dylan mattered when he cut his first album in 1962, and why he still inarguably mattered when Tempest arrived in 2012."

== Track listings ==
=== Standard edition ===
1. "Like a Rolling Stone" – 6:09
2. "Blowin' in the Wind" – 2:47
3. "Subterranean Homesick Blues" – 2:18
4. "Lay Lady Lay" – 3:18
5. "Knockin' on Heaven's Door" – 2:30
6. "I Want You" – 3:05
7. "All Along the Watchtower" – 2:32
8. "Tangled Up in Blue" – 5:42
9. "Don't Think Twice, It's All Right" – 3:39
10. "Hurricane" – 8:32
11. "Just Like a Woman" – 4:50
12. "Mr. Tambourine Man" – 5:25
13. "It Ain't Me Babe" – 3:33
14. "The Times They Are a-Changin'" – 3:11
15. "Duquesne Whistle" – 5:43
16. "Baby, Stop Crying" – 5:19
17. "Make You Feel My Love" – 3:31
18. "Thunder on the Mountain" – 5:55

=== Deluxe edition ===
Disc one

1. "Like a Rolling Stone" – 6:09
2. "Blowin' in the Wind" – 2:47
3. "Subterranean Homesick Blues" – 2:18
4. "Lay Lady Lay" – 3:18
5. "Knockin' on Heaven's Door" – 2:30
6. "I Want You" – 3:05
7. "All Along the Watchtower" – 2:32
8. "Tangled Up in Blue" – 5:42
9. "Don't Think Twice, It's All Right" – 3:39
10. "Hurricane" – 8:32
11. "Just Like a Woman" – 4:50
12. "Mr. Tambourine Man" – 5:25
13. "It Ain't Me Babe" – 3:33
14. "The Times They Are a-Changin'" – 3:11
15. "Duquesne Whistle" – 5:43
16. "Baby, Stop Crying" – 5:19
17. "Make You Feel My Love" – 3:31
18. "Thunder on the Mountain" – 5:55

Disc two

1. "Maggie's Farm" – 3:55
2. "Rainy Day Women, Nos. 12 & 35" – 4:34
3. "Girl from the North Country" – 3:20
4. "Positively 4th Street" (single version) – 3:52
5. "A Hard Rain's a-Gonna Fall" – 6:52
6. "Shelter from the Storm" – 5:02
7. "Mississippi" – 5:21
8. "Quinn the Eskimo (Mighty Quinn)" (live at the Isle of Wight, UK – August 1969) – 2:45
9. "I Shall Be Released" (studio outtake from 1971) – 3:02
10. "It's All Over Now, Baby Blue" – 4:14
11. "Forever Young" (slow version) – 4:55
12. "Gotta Serve Somebody" – 5:25
13. "Things Have Changed" (single version) – 5:08
14. "Jokerman" – 6:15
15. "Not Dark Yet" – 6:28
16. "Ring Them Bells" – 3:00
17. "Beyond Here Lies Nothin'" – 3:48

== Charts ==
=== Weekly charts ===
Chart performance for The Very Best Of
Chart (2013)	Peak position
Irish Albums (OCC)	25
Scottish Albums (OCC)	13
UK Albums (OCC)	16
UK Album Downloads (OCC)	6
UK Physical Albums (OCC)	13
UK Official Albums Chart Update (OCC)	32
UK Official Record Store Chart (OCC)	20
UK Album Sales (OCC)	22
UK Albums Streaming (OCC)	37

Chart (2025)	Peak position
Greek Albums (IFPI)	47

=== Year-end charts ===
Year-end chart performance for The Very Best Of
Chart (2013)	Position
UK Albums (OCC)	187

== Certifications ==
Region	Certification	Certified units/sales
United Kingdom (BPI)	Platinum	300,000^{‡}
^{‡} Sales+streaming figures based on certification alone.
