= In Concert – Brandeis University 1963 =

Live album by Bob Dylan
- Released: April 11, 2011
- Recorded: May 10, 1963
- Venue: Brandeis University, Waltham, Massachusetts
- Genre: Folk
- Length: 38:22
- Label: Columbia

Bob Dylan chronology
The Original Mono Recordings (2010)	In Concert – Brandeis University 1963 (2011)	Tempest (2012)

In Concert – Brandeis University 1963 is an album from a concert performed by American singer-songwriter Bob Dylan at the Brandeis Folk Festival at Brandeis University in Waltham, Massachusetts, on May 10, 1963.

A tape of the concert was found in the basement of San Francisco critic Ralph Gleason, a co-founder of Rolling Stone magazine, after Gleason's death, and was issued in 2010 by Columbia Records. It was offered as a bonus disc by Amazon.com with either The Bootleg Series Vol. 9 – The Witmark Demos: 1962-1964 or Dylan's The Original Mono Recordings for a limited time after its release. The album was officially released on April 12, 2011, in the United States, and a day earlier in Europe.

In the sleeve notes accompanying the CD, Dylan critic Michael Gray writes: “This is the last live performance we have of Bob Dylan before he became a star. Within weeks, The Freewheelin' Bob Dylan is issued; Peter, Paul and Mary release their "Blowin' in the Wind" which sells two million; and in late July Dylan arrives at the Newport Folk Festival as a newcomer and leaves as its stellar success.”

== Track listing ==
All tracks are written by Bob Dylan, except where noted

1st set
No.	Title	Writer(s)	Length
1.	"Honey, Just Allow Me One More Chance" (incomplete)	Dylan, Henry Thomas	1:57
2.	"Talkin' John Birch Paranoid Blues"		4:40
3.	"Ballad of Hollis Brown"		7:10
4.	"Masters of War"		6:30
Total length:			20:17

2nd set
No.	Title	Length
5.	"Talkin' World War III Blues"	6:24
6.	"Bob Dylan's Dream"	5:57
7.	"Talkin' Bear Mountain Picnic Massacre Blues"	5:44
Total length:		18:05
