= Talkin' Bear Mountain Picnic Massacre Blues =

Song by Bob Dylan

Song by Bob Dylan

from the album The Bootleg Series Volumes 1–3 (Rare & Unreleased) 1961–1991
- Released: March 23, 1991
- Recorded: April 25, 1962
- Studio: Studio A, Columbia Recording Studios, New York
- Genre: Talking blues
- Length: 3:45
- Label: Columbia
- Songwriter: Bob Dylan
- Producer: John Hammond

"Talkin' Bear Mountain Picnic Massacre Blues" is a song by American singer-songwriter Bob Dylan. It was written by Dylan in June 1961, and recorded on April 25, 1962, at Studio A, Columbia Recording Studios, New York, produced by John Hammond. It is a humorous talking blues, which Dylan wrote after Noel Stookey gave him a press clipping about how the sale of forged tickets for a Father's Day picnic trip to Bear Mountain State Park had led to overcrowding and injuries.

Before he was signed to Columbia Records in 1961, Dylan regularly performed the song in New York clubs, where it was well-received by audiences. Dylan biographer Clinton Heylin and music journalist Paul Williams have both written that "Talkin' Bear Mountain Picnic Massacre Blues" and "Song to Woody" were the first compositions to gain Dylan notice as a songwriter.

The song was first released on The Bootleg Series Volumes 1–3 (Rare & Unreleased) 1961–1991 in 1991 and received positive reviews from critics. Versions were also released on The Bootleg Series Vol. 9: The Witmark Demos: 1962–1964 (2010) and In Concert – Brandeis University 1963 (2011).

== Background and recording ==
In 1961, Dylan was often inspired in his songwriting by newspaper articles that he had read, and "Talkin' Bear Mountain Picnic Massacre Blues" was written after he was given a news clipping by Noel Stookey. Stookey was a stand-up comic and master of ceremonies, working at The Gaslight Cafe in New York where Dylan performed, and later became a member of Peter, Paul and Mary. He had been impressed by Dylan's reworking of a folk song about a fur trapper into a humorous song about a nightclub, according to an interview for author Howard Sounes's book Down the Highway: The Life of Bob Dylan, and said of the reworked song: "This guy takes years of folk history and the evolution of the American ballad form, and uses it to reflect something contemporary. I was flabbergasted." Stookey gave Dylan a clipping from the New York Herald Tribune of June 19, 1961, thinking that it might provide material for a song. The news story related how a Harlem social club had hired a boat, the Hudson Belle, for a Father's Day picnic trip to Bear Mountain State Park, but after numerous forged tickets had been sold and the boat arrived late, more than twenty people were injured in a fracas. Stookey says that he told Dylan "there's real humor about the state of human greed here."

Dylan reputedly completed the song the following day, June 20, 1961, and told Folklore Center store owner Izzy Young that he wrote the song "overnight". The song was regularly performed by Dylan in New York clubs, and was well-received. Dylan's biographer Clinton Heylin says that these performances allowed Dylan to show off his "caustic wit in its raw state," and that it was the main "song that got him noticed" (along with "Song to Woody") in the months before his meeting with John Hammond, who signed him to Columbia Records in 1961. Music journalist Paul Williams, in the first volume of Bob Dylan, Performing Artist, also identifies those two songs as amongst the first that gained Dylan notice as a songwriter.

The recordings for Dylan's debut album Bob Dylan, produced by Hammond, were made in November 1961. Hammond introduced Dylan to the publishers Leeds Music, and in January 1962, Dylan recorded five songs at the company's offices, including "Talkin' Bear Mountain Picnic Massacre Blues," so that they could be copyrighted and published. Bob Dylan was released on March 19, 1962. The song was not included on any of Dylan's albums before the third take was released in 1991 on The Bootleg Series Volumes 1–3 (Rare & Unreleased) 1961–1991.

Three takes of the song were recorded on April 25, 1962, during the recording sessions for The Freewheelin' Bob Dylan, but none feature on the album. According to Heylin, Hammond had asked Dylan to re-record one of the verses after the second, to get a better recording to be spliced in (known as an "insert"), but Dylan was angry about this as he preferred to perform a complete song rather than only a part. However, he did as Hammond requested. The Leeds Music version was released in 2010 on The Bootleg Series Vol. 9: The Witmark Demos: 1962–1964. A live version from May 10, 1963, was issued on In Concert – Brandeis University 1963 in 2011. In 2012, Sony issued The 50th Anniversary Collection, in an edition of only 100 CD-R discs, in order to extend the copyright in Europe of the songs included. The stated track listing includes Take 2 of "Talkin' Bear Mountain Picnic Massacre Blues", but the recording includes a second copy of "Wichita Blues (Going to Louisiana)" (Take 2) instead, an error which may have made the second take of "Talkin' Bear Mountain Picnic Massacre Blues" public domain.

The song is a talking blues, a form popularized by Chris Bouchillon and used by Woody Guthrie. In Keys to the Rain: The Definitive Bob Dylan Encyclopedia (2004), author Oliver Trager says that the song "not only lampoons avarice, but paints an uproarious portrait of the debacle." He notes that it combines a folk song sensibility with contemporary content. Journalist Andy Greene, writing for Rolling Stone, rated the song as one of Dylan's most humorous. Academic Richard Underwood noted in 2011 that Dylan exaggerated the true numbers from the real-life incident for the song. There were approximately 2,800 people attempting to board the boat, rather than 6,000 mentioned in the song, and that less than twelve were treated at hospital, none of whom had serious injuries.

== Critical reception ==
In the Orlando Sentinel, reviewer Parry Gettelman described "Talkin' Bear Mountain Picnic Massacre Blues" as a highlight of The Bootleg Series Volumes 1–3 (Rare & Unreleased) 1961–1991, finding it "particularly astonishing" and adding that "The lyrics are double-edged, and slapstick details carry darker implications." Wayne Robins in Newsday also identified the song as a high point of the album, praising its "scathing wit". The Sunday News reviewer J.D. Considine felt that the track "possess[ed] a playfulness that has long ago passed out of Dylan's writing". Terry Atkinson, in the Red Deer Advocate, called it "gloriously goofy" and the funniest of three talking blues on the album which together "show that Dylan used to be as capable of wild humor as of dour denunciations and prophecies." The Capital Times writer Eric Rasmussen rated "Talkin' John Birch Paranoid Blues" as a more amusing track on the album, whilst " Talkin' Bear Mountain Picnic Massacre Blues" "hints at the more literary, less political songs [Dylan] would later produce."

== Credits and personnel ==
The personnel for the April 25, 1962, recordings at Studio A, Columbia Recording Studios, New York, are listed below.

Musician

- Bob Dylan – vocals, rhythm guitar, harmonica

Technical

- John Hammond – production
- George Knuerr, Pete Daurier – engineering

== Official releases ==
- The Bootleg Series Volumes 1–3 (Rare & Unreleased) 1961–1991 (released 1991)
- The Bootleg Series Vol. 9: The Witmark Demos: 1962–1964 (released 2010)
- In Concert – Brandeis University 1963 (live recording from May 10, 1963) (released 2011)
