= Lost on the River: The New Basement Tapes =

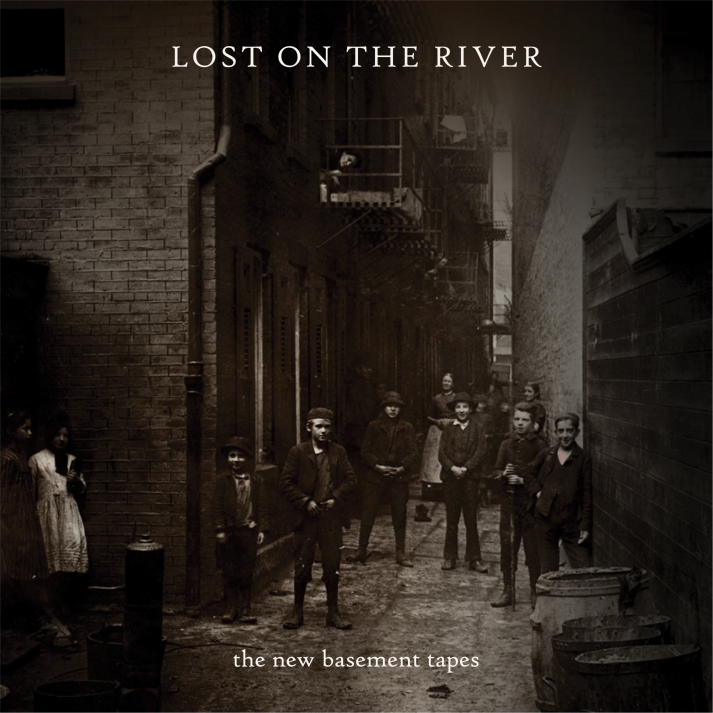

Studio album by the New Basement Tapes
- Released: November 11, 2014
- Recorded: March 2014
- Studio: Capitol (Hollywood)
- Genres: Blues rock, folk rock, country rock, psychedelic rock
- Length: 74:00
- Labels: Electromagnetic Recordings, Harvest
- Producer: T Bone Burnett

Lost on the River: The New Basement Tapes is an album produced by T Bone Burnett featuring a collective of musicians recording under the moniker the New Basement Tapes—Elvis Costello, Rhiannon Giddens, Taylor Goldsmith, Jim James and Marcus Mumford.

The album consists of a series of tracks based on recently uncovered lyrics handwritten by Bob Dylan in 1967; these are believed to have been written in the period between his motorcycle accident (July 29, 1966) and the first recordings in the spring of 1967 in the "Red Room" in Dylan's house, where the first recordings of The Basement Tapes (1975) took place. Lost on the River was released November 11, 2014 in both a standard 15-track release and a "Deluxe Version" featuring 20 tracks.

The album cover image is a photograph by Jacob Riis titled "Mullen's Alley". It was taken in New York City in 1888.

== Background ==
In early May 1967, Dylan told reporter Michael Iachetta: "Songs are in my head like they always are, but they are not going to get written down until some people come forth and make up for some of the things that had happened", probably referring to his conflict with his manager Albert Grossman. During the period in which he started recording with The Hawks, Dylan changed his writing habits and wrote his text directly on a typewriter.

Dylan's publisher contacted Burnett regarding the box of handwritten lyrics that had been found, dating back to Dylan's Basement Tapes days, and asked if he had any interest in doing something with them. As soon as Burnett was assured that Dylan was on board with the project, he agreed to it. Burnett selected his band based on their talent and collaborative style, as well as their interest as "musical archaeologists". Each member of the group was sent the collection of lyrics, and each arrived at the recording session with a selection of tunes, some having set only some of the lyrics, others having set all of them. Not wishing to encourage competition, the group decided to record all the tunes, including multiple settings of the same lyrics. Of the resulting 40 tracks, 20 are included on the present album.

Actor Johnny Depp played guitar on "Kansas City", filling in for Elvis Costello, who could not attend one of the recording sessions due to a previously scheduled concert with The Roots in Las Vegas. Depp also joined the band onstage, along with Haim, for one of their only live performances at the Ricardo Montalban Theater in Los Angeles.

== Reception ==
Professional ratings
Aggregate scores
Source	Rating
Metacritic	75/100
Review scores
Source	Rating
All About Jazz	4/5 stars
AllMusic	3.5/5 stars
American Songwriter	4/5 stars
The Guardian	5/5 stars

In a Los Angeles Times article in 2014, writer Randy Lewis wrote,

The album aims to honor the freewheeling musical spirit and collaborative creative process of the original sessions. One intriguing facet is the collaboration among the participants. Each has come up with his or her own music for many of the lyrics, resulting in multiple versions of the same songs and allowing a perspective on the ways different artists respond to Dylan's lyrics.

A review in The Guardian stated,

Lost on the River recalls the spontaneity and sheer love of music-making of the original, but it’s not hamstrung by reverence or caution.

In Uncut, Graeme Thomson wrote,

Lost On The River is an album of good, sometimes excellent songs with a unique creation story which, in the end, adds little of substance to the narrative of perhaps the most mythologised recordings in history. As footnotes go, however, it’s an entertaining, energised and often fascinating one.

Writing for MXDWN, Elliot Greiner said,

Fulfilling the marketable promise that supergroups bring, Burnett’s ensemble infuses great musicianship into the project, however a disconnect remains; Lost is an album of Dylan songs that sounds like an album of anything but.

The critical aggregator website Metacritic awarded Lost on the River a score of 75 indicating "generally favorable reviews", based on the published reviews of 18 critics.

== Bob Dylan's original Basement Tapes ==
Among Bob Dylan’s cultural milestones, the Basement Tapes – around 100 songs written and recorded by Dylan in 1967, backed by members of his touring ensemble who would later achieve their own fame as The Band – have fascinated successive generations of musicians, fans and cultural critics. Having transformed music and culture during the preceding five years, Dylan had achieved great fame by the mid-1960s through the release of three historic albums, the single, "Like a Rolling Stone", a controversial "electric" performance at the Newport Folk Festival and tours of the United States, Australia and Europe which polarized his audience. Dylan's large body of work in that decade was interrupted in July 1966 when it was reported that he had been badly injured in a motorcycle accident in upstate New York.

Recovering from his injuries and away from the public eye, Dylan ensconced himself, along with Robbie Robertson, Rick Danko, Richard Manuel, Garth Hudson and, later, Levon Helm, in the basement of a small house in West Saugerties, New York – dubbed "Big Pink" by the group. This collective recorded more than a hundred songs over the next several months – traditional covers, wry and humorous ditties, off-the cuff performances and dozens of newly-written Bob Dylan songs, including "I Shall Be Released", "The Mighty Quinn", "Tears of Rage", and "You Ain't Goin' Nowhere".

When rumors and acetates of some basement recordings began to surface, the album Great White Wonder appeared in a few record shops in 1969 as one of the first bootleg records. Dylan's original recordings remained commercially unavailable until 1975, when Columbia Records released 16 of Dylan's songs on The Basement Tapes album.

== Videos ==
As of October 26, 2014, five lyric videos had been released for tracks from the album, each of them featuring Bob Dylan's actual handwritten lyrics inhabiting an animated environment:

"Nothing to It", with lead vocal by Jim James, The New Basement Tapes - Nothing To It - Lyrics by Bob Dylan & Lead Vocals by Jim James on August 19, 2014.
"Married to My Hack", with lead vocal by Elvis Costello, Married To My Hack - Lyrics by Bob Dylan & Lead Vocals by Elvis Costello on September 2, 2014.
"When I Get My Hands on You", with lead vocal by Marcus Mumford, When I Get My Hands On You - Lyrics by Bob Dylan & Vocals by Marcus Mumford on September 23, 2014.
"Spanish Mary", with lead vocal by Rhiannon Giddens, Spanish Mary - Lyrics by Bob Dylan & Lead Vocals by Rhiannon Giddens on October 14, 2014.
"Liberty Street", with lead vocal by Taylor Goldsmith, Liberty Street - Lyrics by Bob Dylan & Lead Vocals by Taylor Goldsmith on October 26, 2014.

== Track listing ==
The 20-track "Deluxe Version" listed below includes five additional songs not found on the standard issue, "Golden Tom – Silver Judas", "Quick Like a Flash", "Hidee Hidee Ho #16", "Diamond Ring", and "The Whistle Is Blowing".

Vinyl side 1
No.	Title	Writer(s)	Length
1.	"Down on the Bottom"	Bob Dylan, Jim James	4:29
2.	"Married to My Hack"	Dylan, Elvis Costello	1:57
3.	"Kansas City"	Dylan, Marcus Mumford, Taylor Goldsmith	4:04
4.	"Spanish Mary"	Dylan, Rhiannon Giddens	5:31
5.	"Liberty Street"	Dylan, Goldsmith	2:45

Vinyl side 2
No.	Title	Writer(s)	Length
6.	"Nothing to It"	Dylan, James	3:32
7.	"Golden Tom – Silver Judas"	Dylan, Costello	2:39
8.	"When I Get My Hands on You"	Dylan, Mumford, Goldsmith	3:10
9.	"Duncan and Jimmy"	Dylan, Giddens	4:10
10.	"Florida Key"	Dylan, Goldsmith	3:19

Vinyl side 3
No.	Title	Writer(s)	Length
11.	"Hidee Hidee Ho #11"	Dylan, James	4:45
12.	"Lost on the River #12"	Dylan, Costello	3:42
13.	"Stranger"	Dylan, Mumford	4:22
14.	"Card Shark"	Dylan, Goldsmith	2:36
15.	"Quick Like a Flash"	Dylan, James	3:17

Vinyl side 4
No.	Title	Writer(s)	Length
16.	"Hidee Hidee Ho #16"	Dylan, Giddens, Costello	3:51
17.	"Diamond Ring"	Dylan, Goldsmith	2:54
18.	"The Whistle Is Blowing"	Dylan, Mumford	5:10
19.	"Six Months in Kansas City (Liberty Street)"	Dylan, Costello	3:36
20.	"Lost on the River #20"	Dylan, Giddens, Mumford	3:47
Total length:			74:00

== Personnel ==
- Elvis Costello – vocals (1, 2, 6, 7, 10, 12, 14–16, 18, 19), acoustic guitar (10, 16), 12-string acoustic guitar (7), electric guitar (1, 2, 4, 12, 19), electric tenor guitar (9), slide guitar (11), electric mandocaster (18), ukulele (14), bass (5, 6, 17), organ (8, 13, 15), Mellotron (3)
- Rhiannon Giddens – vocals (2, 4, 6, 9, 11, 12, 14, 16, 19, 20), banjo (9), minstrel banjo (4), fiddle (5, 8, 10, 11, 12, 13, 14, 15)
- Taylor Goldsmith – vocals (1, 3, 5, 7, 9, 10, 13–19), acoustic guitar (7, 10, 11, 14, 16, 17, 20), electric guitar (8, 13, 18), baritone guitar (3), bass (1, 2, 4, 14, 15), piano (3, 5, 6, 18, 19), organ (10, 18), Mellotron (9, 12)
- Jim James – vocals (1, 3, 6–11, 14–19), acoustic guitar (7), electric guitar (1, 3–6, 10, 15), bass (8, 9, 12, 13, 16, 18, 19), organ (1, 14, 17), Mellotron (2, 4, 5, 11), synthesizer (6), OP-1 (17)
- Marcus Mumford – vocals (1, 3, 6–10, 19), acoustic guitar (3, 18, 19, 20), electric guitar (6, 8, 9, 13, 17), mandolin (1, 3, 10, 11, 12, 14, 16), drums (1, 2, 4, 5, 15), brushes (7)
- Jay Bellerose – drums (1–6, 8, 9, 11–19), percussion (8, 17), tambourine (13)
- T Bone Burnett – electric guitar (2)
- Zach Dawes – bass (3, 11)
- Johnny Depp – electric guitar (3)
- Griffin Goldsmith – drums (3, 11, 13)
- Alana Haim – backing vocals (3, 18)
- Danielle Haim – backing vocals (3, 18)
- Este Haim – backing vocals (3, 18)
- Binki Shapiro – backing vocals (3, 18)
- S.I. Istwa – backing vocals (5, 11, 20)
- Jessica Kiley – backing vocals (5, 11, 20)
- Megan Lovell – backing vocals (5, 11, 19, 20)
- Rebecca Lovell – mandolin (20), backing vocals (5, 11, 19, 20)
- Carla Azar – drums (6, 9, 12, 19)
- Bo Koster – piano (11)

== Charts ==
=== Weekly charts ===
Chart (2014–16)	Peak position
Australian Albums (ARIA)	69
Belgian Albums (Ultratop Flanders)	130
Dutch Albums (Album Top 100)	60
Swedish Albums (Sverigetopplistan)	58
US Billboard 200	23
US Americana/Folk Albums (Billboard)	2
US Independent Albums (Billboard)	2
US Top Rock Albums (Billboard)	4

=== Year-end charts ===
Chart (2015)	Position
US Top Rock Albums (Billboard)	23

== See also ==
- New Multitudes a similar project using Woody Guthrie lyrics also featuring Jim James.
- Out Among the Stars, a 2014 Johnny Cash album composed of abandoned sessions which also features Elvis Costello
- Forever Words, a 2018 album of Cash lyrics finished by several musicians, including Burnett and Costello
- List of songs written by Bob Dylan
- List of artists who have covered Bob Dylan songs
