= Talking blues =

Musical form

Talking blues is a music genre derived from folk and country music. It is characterized by rhythmic speech or near-speech where the melody is free, but the rhythm is strict.

Chris Bouchillon, billed as "The Talking Comedian of the South", is credited with creating the "talking blues" music genre with the song "Talking Blues", recorded for Columbia Records in Atlanta, Georgia in 1926, from which the style takes its name. The song was released the next year, followed by a sequel, "New Talking Blues", released in 1928. Another of his songs, "Born in Hard Luck", released around the same years, is similar in style.

== Overview ==
A talking blues typically consists of a repetitive guitar line utilizing a three chord progression which, although it is called a "blues", is not actually a twelve bar blues. The vocals are sung in a rhythmic, flat tone, very near to a speaking voice, and take the form of rhyming couplets. At the end of each verse, consisting of two couplets, the singer continues to talk, adding a fifth line consisting of an irregular, generally unrhymed, and unspecified number of bars, often with a pause in the middle of the line, before resuming the strict chordal structure. This example, from "Talking Blues" by Woody Guthrie, a cover of "New Talking Blues" by Bouchillon, serves to explain the format:

Mama's in the kitchen fixin' the yeast
Papa's in the bedroom greasin' his feets
Sister's in the cellar squeezin' up the hops
Brother's at the window just a-watchin' for the cops

Drinkin' home brew ... makes you happy.

The lyrics to a talking blues are characterized by dry, rural humor, with the spoken codetta often adding a wry commentary on the subject of the verse, like Bob Dylan's "Talkin' Bear Mountain Picnic Massacre Blues".

Now, I don't care just what you do
If you wanta have a picnic, that's up t' you
But don't tell me about it, I don't wanta hear it
Cause, see, I just lost all m' picnic spirit
Stay in m' kitchen, have m' own picnic...

In the bathroom.

== Development of the genre ==
Woody Guthrie and his song "Talking Hard Work" is a title-tribute to Bouchillon's "Talking Blues" and "Born in Hard Luck".

The "Talking Blues" begins with the line:

Well, if you want to get to heaven,
Let me tell you what to do,
Got to grease your feet into little mutton stew.

Several sources of the 1940s–1950s, including the Almanac Singers, wrongly credited Guthrie as the creator of the talking blues. By the 1940s, what had started as a comedic country music genre became a more pronounced form of wry political protest singing. This sample lyric, from "Talking Union" by Pete Seeger, Lee Hays, and Millard Lampell shows the development of the genre into a vehicle for political commentary:

Now, if you want higher wages, let me tell you what to do
You got to talk to the workers in the shop with you
You got to build you a union, got to make it strong
But if you all stick together, boys, it won't be long

You'll get shorter hours, better working conditions, vacations with pay ... take your kids to the seashore.

In 1958, the musician and folk music scholar John Greenway recorded an album collection called "Talking Blues" on the Folkways label. His compendium included 15 talking blues songs by Guthrie, Tom Glazer, and others, and was, according to the music historian Manfred Helfert, the "obvious source" for the many 1960s forays into the genre by Bob Dylan. Bob Dylan recorded "Talking World War III Blues" in 1963.

Well, I rung the fallout shelter bell
And I leaned my head and I gave a yell
"Give me a string bean, I'm a hungry man!"
A shotgun fired and away I ran

I don't blame them too much, though ... he didn't know me

Dylan's fame and his repeated use of the talking blues form contributed to the genre becoming a widely popular vehicle for the composition of songs with political content. When the country singer Johnny Cash recorded a song that described his trip to Vietnam with his wife June Carter Cash, he chose the talking blues format to describe his dissent against the Vietnam War.

Talking blues is also popular as a medium for parody, as in "Like a Lamb to the Slaughter", Frank Hayes's talking-blues parody of Matty Groves:

One high, one holy holiday, on the first day of the year,
Little Matty Groves to church did go, some holy words to hear
When in come old Lord Arnold's wife, she looked at him and said,
"Come here often? What's your sign?" And off they went to bed.
In the interests of brevity, we'll omit some of the more repetitive parts of the song.
Like the part where they get undressed.

All forty-seven verses of it.

== Notable examples ==
- "Talking Blues" (1926) and "New Talking Blues" (1928) by Christopher Allen Bouchillon.
- "Talking Dust Bowl Blues" (1940), "Talking Fishing Blues", "Talking Centralia", "Talking Columbia", "Talking Hard Work", "Talking Sailor", "Talking Subway", and "Mean Talking Blues" by Woody Guthrie.
- "Talking Union," by Pete Seeger, Lee Hays, and Millard Lampell.
- "Atomic Talking Blues" (a.k.a. "Talking Atom", "Old Man Atom") by Vern Partlow.
- "Talking Inflation Blues" by Tom Glazer.
- "Talkin' New York", "Talking World War III Blues" (1963), "Talking New York", "Talking Hava Negiliah Blues", "Talkin' John Birch Paranoid Blues", "I Shall Be Free No. 10", and "Talkin' Bear Mountain Picnic Massacre Blues" by Bob Dylan, all recorded during the 1960s.
- "To Beat The Devil” by Kris Kristofferson
- "Talkin' Candy Bar Blues" by Peter, Paul & Mary on A Song Will Rise (1965).
- "Singing in Viet Nam Talking Blues" by Johnny Cash.
- "Another Puff" (1971) by Jerry Reed.
- "Talking Birmingham Jam" (1963), "Talking Airplane Disaster" (1963), "Talking Cuban Crisis" (1963), "Talking Vietnam" (1964) by Phil Ochs.
- "Talking Thunderbird Blues" (1973), "Fraternity Blues" (1977) by Townes Van Zandt.
- "Talking New Bob Dylan" by Loudon Wainwright III on his album History (1992).
- "Alice's Restaurant" (1967) by Arlo Guthrie
- “Catch and Release” by Billy Strings on Highway Prayers (2024)

== See also ==
- Bob and wheel
- Hip hop music
- Rapping
- Recitation song
- Spoken word
- Sprechgesang
- Talking Timbuktu
