= The New Basement Tapes =

British-American musical supergroup

- Labels: Electromagnetic; Harvest
- Members: Jim James; Elvis Costello; Marcus Mumford; Taylor Goldsmith; Rhiannon Giddens
- Website: thenewbasementtapes.com

The New Basement Tapes is a British-American musical supergroup made up of members Jim James, Elvis Costello, Marcus Mumford, Taylor Goldsmith, and Rhiannon Giddens.

The group is known for their 2014 album Lost on the River: The New Basement Tapes, which consists of tracks based on newly uncovered lyrics handwritten by Bob Dylan in 1967. These lyrics were written during the same period Dylan recorded the album released in 1975 as The Basement Tapes, in partnership with The Band. The group is also featured in the 2014 Showtime documentary Lost Songs: The Basement Tapes Continued.

== History ==
The New Basement Tapes were brought together in March 2014 to work with producer T Bone Burnett on putting together a new album with song lyrics penned by Bob Dylan in 1967. The group recorded dozens of songs over a two-week period in Capitol Records studio, with members of the group swapping instrumental and vocal roles on the different album tracks. The album was released in November 2014 by Electromagnetic Recordings via Harvest Records.

During the recording sessions, the group was filmed for a documentary for Showtime. Titled Lost Songs: The Basement Tapes Continued, the documentary is directed by Sam Jones and also contains an exclusive interview with Bob Dylan. It goes behind the scenes of the recording process and also discusses the story behind the discovery of the lost lyrics. Johnny Depp also appears in the documentary, having stopped by the studio to play guitar on the song "Kansas City".

== Discography ==
Studio albums
Title	Album details
Lost on the River: The New Basement Tapes	Released: 2014; Label: Electromagnetic Recordings, Harvest Records; Format:
