= Talkin' New York =

Song by Bob Dylan

from the album Bob Dylan
- Released: March 19, 1962
- Recorded: November 20, 1961
- Studio: Columbia Studio A (New York City)
- Genre: Talking blues
- Length: 3:20
- Label: Columbia
- Songwriter: Bob Dylan
- Producer: John Hammond

"Talkin' New York" is the second song on Bob Dylan's eponymous first album, released in 1962. A talking blues, the song describes his feelings on arriving in New York City from Minnesota, his time playing coffee houses in Greenwich Village, and his life as a folksinger without a record deal. The lyrics express the apparent difficulty he had finding gigs as a result of his unique sound, with a character in the song telling Dylan: "You sound like a hillbilly; We want folk singers here."

The song was recorded on 20 November 1961 at Columbia Studio A, 799 Seventh Avenue, New York City, produced by John Hammond.

== Background ==
According to Clinton Heylin, "Talkin' New York" was one of several attempts by Dylan in 1961 to compose a "'New York is a mean ol' town song'" In 1961, Dylan wrote "Down at Washington Square," a ballad about the 9 April 1961 police attack on the folksingers' gathering at Washington Square Park, and reworked the lyrics several times, although there is no evidence that the song was either recorded or featured in any of his live performances. He also started a song that remained unfinished, called "NYC Blues," at around the same time, before composing "Talkin' New York" by May 1961, reputedly whilst on a trip to his home state of Minnesota. Note that Dylan returned to this theme later in 1961 by writing "Hard Times in New York Town".

Two versions of "Talkin' New York" were recorded on 20 November 1961 at Columbia Studio A, 799 Seventh Avenue, New York City, during the first of two sessions that provided the material for Dylan's eponymous debut album. Dylan sang, and played a Gibson J-50 acoustic guitar and harmonica on the track, with John Hammond as producer. The second take was used on Bob Dylan, which was released on 19 March 1962, and was also included on The Original Mono Recordings in 2010.

It was the first of Dylan's own songs to be recorded for Bob Dylan, with the two takes of "Song To Woody," the album's other Dylan composition, following immediately afterwards.

This early example of Dylan's songwriting exhibits many traits which later became synonymous with his work. For example, the line A lot of people don't have much food on their table/But they got a lot of forks n' knives/And they gotta cut somethin'. has been cited as an early example of Dylan's lyrical wit.

The lines Now, a very great man once said/That some people rob you with a fountain pen. make specific reference to Woody Guthrie's "Pretty Boy Floyd". The song's structure and theme also bear similarities to Guthrie's "Talkin' Columbia", which Dylan had covered at least once in 1961, and "Talkin' Subway", with which one Dylan cataloguer drew an explicit connection. Both Guthrie and Dylan were both highly influenced by late 1920s country recording artist Chris Bouchillon, who first coined the term Talkin' Blues.

US singer-songwriter Loudon Wainwright III, who had been labelled a "new Bob Dylan" in his early career, recorded a parody/tribute song called 'Talkin' New Bob Dylan' on his 1992 album History.

Laurie Anderson covered "Talkin' New York" at a concert to celebrate Dylan's 77th birthday in 2018.

== Personnel ==
The personnel for the 20 November 1961 recordings at Studio A, Columbia Recording Studios, New York, are listed below.

Musician

- Bob Dylan – vocals, rhythm guitar, harmonica

Technical

- John Hammond – production
- George Knuerr, Pete Daurier – engineering

== Official releases ==
- Bob Dylan (released 1962)
- The Original Mono Recordings (released 2010)
