= My Own Love Song =

- Theatrical poster
- Directed by: Olivier Dahan
- Written by: Olivier Dahan
- Produced by: Alain Goldman; Olivier Dahan
- Starring: Renée Zellweger; Forest Whitaker; Madeline Zima; Nick Nolte
- Cinematography: Matthew Libatique
- Edited by: Richard Marizy
- Music by: Bob Dylan
- Production companies: Légende Films; Studio 37; Orange Cinéma Séries; Canal+
- Distributed by: Mars Distribution
- Release date: April 7, 2010 (France)
- Running time: 102 minutes
- Country: France
- Language: English

My Own Love Song is a 2010 road movie directed and written by Olivier Dahan and starring Renée Zellweger, Forest Whitaker, Madeline Zima and Nick Nolte. It premiered in Dahan's native France on April 7, 2010, and in the United States at the Tribeca Film Festival between April 21 to May 2, 2010.

The soundtrack contains music written by Bob Dylan, including Zellweger singing a cover of "Life Is Hard" from his 2009 album Together Through Life.

== Plot ==
In Marysville, Kansas, a paralyzed former singer, Jane, argues with her stuttering friend Joey about his belief that he can talk to the invisible world. One day, during her physiotherapy treatment, he messes up her house while searching for a book about angels that he has lent her. He is taken by the police to a hospital, where an angry Jane visits.

The following night, Joey escapes and comes back to Jane's house to clean up. He finds a letter from her young son inviting her to his communion in Baton Rouge, Louisiana, where he lives with his adoptive family. Joey spends the night on the couch.

In the morning, the police ask her if Joey is in her house, but he has already left. Joey begs Jane to go to New Orleans, where an author writing about angels is holding a conference.

On the drive, the engine heats up and the car explodes. They buy a new car, but it is stolen. They board a coach and while Jane sleeps, Joey meets Billie by helping her find her wedding ring on the floor. She tells him her husband has disappeared without giving an address. The three dine at Billie's sister's house. The next morning, Joey, Jane and Billie are driven to a restaurant by a relative, but Jane forgets her purse in the car, so Joey elaborates a plan to get them to the bus without paying. The plan does not work but they eventually get into the bus, where they argue about what they've done. The bus driver abandons them in the middle of nowhere. Jane decides to go back home and Joey reveals her son's letter.

At night, the three hear music and meet Caldwell, an old musician with whom they share some cake enhanced with drugs. The following day, Caldwell gives them a lift, as Jane agrees to replace a singer. Shortly before the show, Jane argues with Joey about his mothering her. She leaves the group and meets fellow travelers going to Iowa. The woman of the couple is ill and they are going there on their last trip to visit their children. This inspiring meeting persuades Jane to perform the show. She arrives on stage while Joey prays for her to come back. She sings "This Land Is Your Land" accompanied by Caldwell on electric guitar, to applause from the club.

As they drive towards New Orleans, they notice their stolen car on the road and chase the thief. An accident ensues and everybody is arrested and subsequently freed except Caldwell, who is taken to prison. Jane gives him a song written for him, about the beauty of birds.

In New Orleans, Joey attends the conference about angels, but discovers the author is a racist and a liar. He does not believe in what he writes and hates his Black and Mexican readership. Joey punches him in the face and the three travelers are expelled from the conference.

They get to the train station and are bound to Baton Rouge when Billie receives a call. Her husband is on the phone and seems ready to come back home. She leaves Jane and Joey before their train departs.

In Baton Rouge, as they reach Jane's son's communion, she is afraid that she will not recognize him seven years after her accident and subsequent coma. Joey tells her to sing, so that he will find her. She listens to his advice, and her son, who was about to leave, stops in front of her.

The final scene is set later back in Kansas. Joey and Jane are sitting in front of a lake. Her son and his adoptive parents arrive for a visit. Jane and Joey hold hands as the three approach.

== Cast ==
- Renée Zellweger as Jane
- Forest Whitaker as Joey
- Madeline Zima as Billie
- Nick Nolte as Caldwell
- Elias Koteas as Dean
- Annie Parisse as Nora
- Julia Lashae as Suzie
- Alec Rayme as Policeman Who Helps Jane
- Keith Barber as Cop From Jane's Town

== Production ==
Production began in October 2008 in Kansas and Louisiana.
