= Chris Bouchillon =

American singer-songwriter (1893–1968)

- Born: Christopher Allen Bouchillon; August 21, 1893; Oconee County, South Carolina, U.S.
- Died: September 18, 1968 (aged 75) West Palm Beach, Florida, U.S.
- Genres: Country; Blues; Talking blues
- Occupation: Musician
- Instruments: Vocal; Mandolin; Voice

Christopher Allen Bouchillon (August 21, 1893 – September 18, 1968) was an American country and blues musician from South Carolina, U.S., who is often credited to have been the originator of the talking blues music genre.

== Family ==
Bouchillon was born on August 21, 1893 to John and Hester Patterson Bouchillon in Oconee County, South Carolina and died on September 18, 1968, in West Palm Beach, Palm Beach County, Florida. Bouchillon married twice. His first marriage was to Susan Moore, with whom he had two sons, Chris Jr (c June 1920 - December 1920) and Robert Anderson Bouchillon (August 27, 1918 - June 1988). His second marriage was to Ethel Mae Waters (1903 – 1980), daughter of Leverett Waters and Louise Smith Waters.

== Musical achievements ==
Taking after his banjo playing father, John Bouchillon, Chris became a musician. Along with his brothers, Charlie and Uris, he formed the Bouchillon Trio. Chris played the mandolin and provided vocals, while Charley played fiddle and Uris played guitar. Together they recorded six sides, two of which under the name "The Greenville Trio." In 1928 he began recording songs with his second wife, Ethel Waters. He retired from professional music during The Great Depression.

== Creation of the "talking blues" ==
Bouchillon developed his trademark "talking" way of singing because of his supposedly horrible singing voice. His recording director reportedly loved to listen to him talk however, and recommended he re-record a few songs by talking instead of singing. The resultant record, "Talking Blues" was released in 1927 and became a hit. This unique talking style of singing became known as the talking blues and inspired artists such as Woody Guthrie and Bob Dylan.

== Discography ==
=== Compilation ===
- The Original Talking Blues Man (Old Homestead, 1987)

=== Songs ===
- She Doodle Dooed - 7 July 1925, Atlanta, Georgia - as The Bouchillon Trio
- Talking Blues, Hannah - 4 November 1926, Atlanta, Georgia
- Waltz Me Around Again Willie, Let It Alone, You Look Awful Good To Me, In A City Far Away - 26 March 1927, Atlanta, Georgia
- South Carolina Blues, My Fat Girl, Born In Hard Luck, The Medicine Show - 5 April 1927, Atlanta, Georgia
- Chris Visits The Barber Shop, A Bull Fight In Mexico, A Week End At Sam Stover's, Hebrew and Home Brew, Good Night Run - 10 November 1927, Atlanta, Georgia
- Sam Stover and the Clergyman - 10 November 1927, Atlanta, Georgia
- Old Blind Heck, New Talking Blues, I Got Mine - 1, 2, I've Been Married Three Times, My Wife's Wedding, Oyster Stew, - 16 April 1928, Atlanta, Georgia
- Adam And Eve - Part 1-4 - 29 October 1928 - as Mr & Mrs Chris Bouchillon
- Speed Maniac, Ambitious Father, Girls of To-day, Oh Miss Lizzie - 30 October 1928, Atlanta, Georgia
