= Walls of Red Wing =

Song by Bob Dylan

from the album The Bootleg Series Volumes 1-3 (Rare & Unreleased) 1961-1991
- Released: March 26, 1991
- Recorded: April 24, 1963
- Genre: Folk
- Length: 5:05
- Label: Columbia
- Songwriter: Bob Dylan

"Walls of Red Wing" is a folk and protest song, written by American singer-songwriter Bob Dylan. Originally recorded for Dylan's second album, The Freewheelin' Bob Dylan, it was not included, and eventually attempted for his next work, The Times They Are a-Changin', but, again, this version was never released. The version recorded for Freewheelin' eventually appeared on The Bootleg Series Volumes 1-3 (Rare & Unreleased) 1961-1991. The song describes a boys' reform school located in Red Wing, Minnesota.

== Composition ==
Dylan based "Walls of Red Wing" on the traditional Scottish folk ballad "The Road and the Miles to Dundee", which he may have learned during his trip to London in early 1963, from other aspiring folk singers, such as Martin Carthy. In his narration, Dylan goes to describe a juvenile detention center in Red Wing, Minnesota. The description is hyperbolic, and describes the students there as "thrown in like bandits and cast off like criminals", the walls of "barbed wire" and the fence with "electricity's sting", the guards holding their clubs like they were "kings", and the supposed "dungeon" of the building. Despite these harrowing descriptions, Red Wing was not the impenetrable "Gothic fortress" (as John Bauldie calls it) portrayed in this song. During this time the facility didn’t have an exterior fence leading to residents escaping into the neighboring town of Wacouta

== Cover versions ==
Joan Baez covered this song on her 1968 album Any Day Now; Ramblin' Jack Elliot covered it in 1997 on his album Friends of Mine.
