= Cassini periodical cicadas =

Periodical cicadas

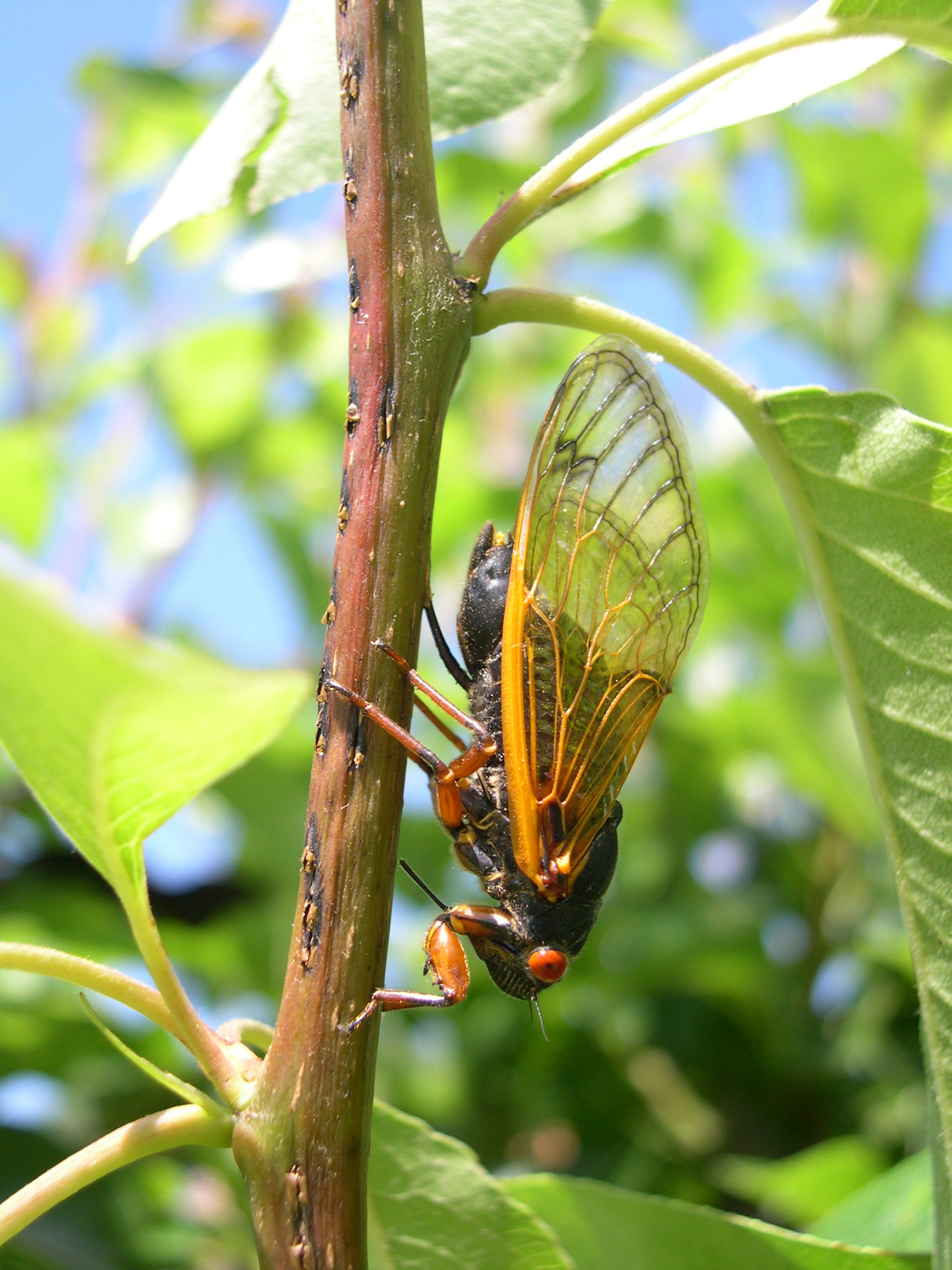
Magicicada cassini female during oviposition.

Brood XIII song

The Cassini periodical cicadas are a pair of closely related species of periodical cicadas: Magicicada cassini (Note: The original spelling for Fisher's 17-year periodical cicada species is cassinii, with two terminal 'i's, but a large majority of publications have spelled the name cassini since the mid-1960s. Although cassini is an incorrect subsequent spelling under Article 33.4 of the rules of nomenclature, Article 33.3.1 states that "when an incorrect subsequent spelling is in prevailing usage and is attributed to the publication of the original spelling, the subsequent spelling and attribution are to be preserved and the spelling is deemed to be a correct original spelling". The correct spelling for the 13-year relative is tredecassini.) (Fisher, 1852), having a 17-year life cycle, and Magicicada tredecassini (Alexander and Moore, 1962), a nearly identical species with a 13-year life cycle.

Courting behavior of Cassini cicadas is unusual because large groups of males may sing and fly together in synchrony. Bursts of sound alternate with silence as thousands of males sing in unison, then leave perches and seek a new perch before the next ensemble song.

== Description ==
All Magicicada species have a black dorsal thorax with red eyes and orange wing veins. Cassini periodical cicadas are smaller than decim periodical cicadas. The abdomen is black except for occasional faint orange-yellow marks on the ventral surface seen in some location.

In a typical brood of periodical cicadas, decim and decula types will be present as well as cassini. The three different types have unique species song-types; they also tend to sing at different times of day, with cassini choruses most likely in mid- to late afternoon, later than decim or decula varieties. The cassini-type song consists of a series of ticks followed by a buzz; it has also been described as sounding like "someone trying to get a lawnmower started."

Magicicada males seek out sunlit vegetation, where they typically gather with conspecific males to form large choruses, alternating singing behavior with short flights. Cassini-type males are unusual in synchronizing these behaviors, so that thousands of males sing their mating song in unison and then fly together. according to Alexander and Moore (1958):

Almost every singing male in a woods containing tens of thousands of singers achieves synchrony with all the others, and the result gives the impression of a gigantic game of musical chairs. A treeful of these insects singing in synchrony is motionless when observed during the great burst of sound caused by insects buzzing together, and then becomes a frenzy of activity between buzzes with nearly every individual changing perches.

The "congregational" singing of males (so-called because it inspires both males and females to congregate) requires this synchrony in cassini-types for its success.

== Habitat ==
Periodical cicadas live in eastern United States east of the Great Plains. Cassini-type cicadas are especially common in the most southwestern populations and are the only 17-year cicada species found in Oklahoma and Texas.

Cassini-type cicadas are most often found in deciduous lowland woods and flood plains, rather than the upland woods favored by other Magicicada.

== Ecological impact ==
Egg-laying by a large brood may cause many twigs to die off but does little long-term harm to mature trees.
