= Magicicada neotredecim =

Scientific classification
- Domain: Eukaryota
- Kingdom: Animalia
- Phylum: Arthropoda
- Class: Insecta
- Order: Hemiptera
- Suborder: Auchenorrhyncha
- Family: Cicadidae
- Genus: Magicicada
- Species: M. neotredecim

Binomial name
- Magicicada neotredecim Marshall & Cooley, 2000

Species of true bug

Magicicada neotredecim is the most recently discovered species of periodical cicada. Like all Magicicada species, M. neotredecim has reddish eyes and wing veins and a black dorsal thorax. It has a 13-year life cycle but seems to be most closely related to the 17-year species Magicicada septendecim. Both species are distinguished by broad orange stripes on the abdomen and a unique high-pitched song said to resemble someone calling "weeeee-whoa" or "Pharaoh." They differ only in life cycle length.

Another closely related 13-year species Magicicada tredecim differs very slightly from M. neotredecim, and for many years two were considered one species with slight differences in abdomen color and mitochondrial DNA suggesting a zone of hybridization or introgression between 13-year and 17-year -decim populations. Then in 1998, scientists studying recordings of the chorus sound of Brood XIX recognized that the low-pitch component of the chorus contained two peak frequencies in some midwestern populations, corresponding to the songs of two sympatric 13-yr species related to M. septendecim. Experiments subsequently demonstrated the existence of two populations of female cicadas that responded selectively based on the two male song frequencies. Because of their many similarities, M. neotredecim, M. tredecim, and M. septendecim are often described together as "decim periodical cicadas."

== Broods and distribution ==
Periodical cicadas are assigned to broods based on their year of emergence and life-cycle length. The other three 13-year species (M. tredecim, M. tredecassini, and M. tredecula) are represented in all three of the extant 13-year broods: Brood XIX (emerging in 2011), Brood XXII (emerging in 2014), and Brood XXIII (emerging in 2015). M. neotredecim was first discovered in 1998 in Brood XIX, where it occurs toward the northern part of the range, showing a narrow range of overlap with the more southern species M. tredecim. It has also been observed in Brood XXIII but not in Brood XXII.

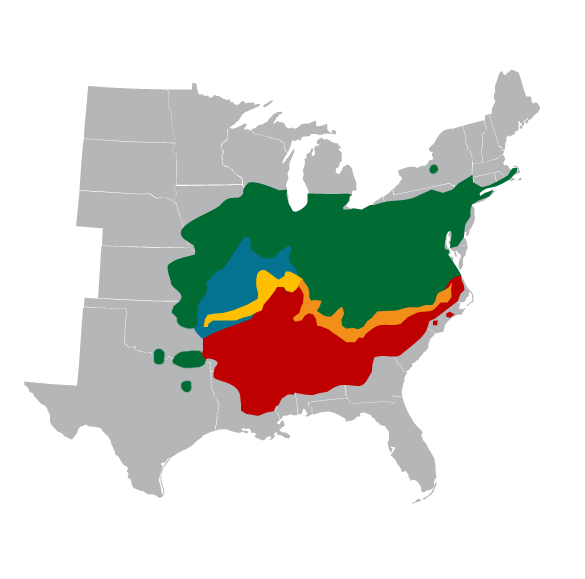
Distribution of the species of the genus Magicicada in the U.S.: green = 17-year cicadas; other colors = 13-year cicadas; blue = M. neotredecim, yellow = overlap of M. neotredecim with M. tredecim

== Life cycle ==
Their median life cycle from egg to natural adult death is around thirteen years. However, their life cycle can range from nine years to seventeen years.

== Discovery in 1998 ==
Magicicada males typically form large aggregations that sing in chorus to attract receptive females. M. neotredecim was first identified when scientists noticed a bimodal split in the dominant pitch (frequency) of male calling songs during the 1998 emergence of Brood XIX. The dominant song pitch of M. neotredecim ranges from 1.25 kHz to 1.90 kHz. (This is similar to the pitch-range of M. septendecim except that songs of the 17-year species do not extend so far into high frequencies.) M. neotredecim song frequencies have been observed to displace upward in areas where their range overlaps with the similar M. tredecim, whose dominant song pitch is lower, ranging between 1.00 kHz and 1.25 kHz.

These distinctive calling songs prompted a closer look at older data concerning M. tredecim. Two different forms of mitochondrial DNA, correlated with a difference in abdominal color, had already been seen in insects assigned to this species. David Marshall and John Cooley determined that these known differences correlated with the observed pitch difference in males and a corresponding pitch preference in females. The name M. neotredecim was given to the variant whose song and abdominal coloring (orange with a black lateral band or center) resemble the 17-year species M. septendecim. The earlier name M. tredecim was reserved for the group whose abdomen is mostly orange and whose song has a lower pitch.

The discovery of Magicicada neotredecim showed that four reproductively isolated 13-year periodical cicada species emerge together in a narrow region from southern Indiana to northwest Arkansas (encompassing sections of Broods XIX and XXIII). Elsewhere, only as many as three species can be found together.
