= Brood V =

Periodical cicada brood

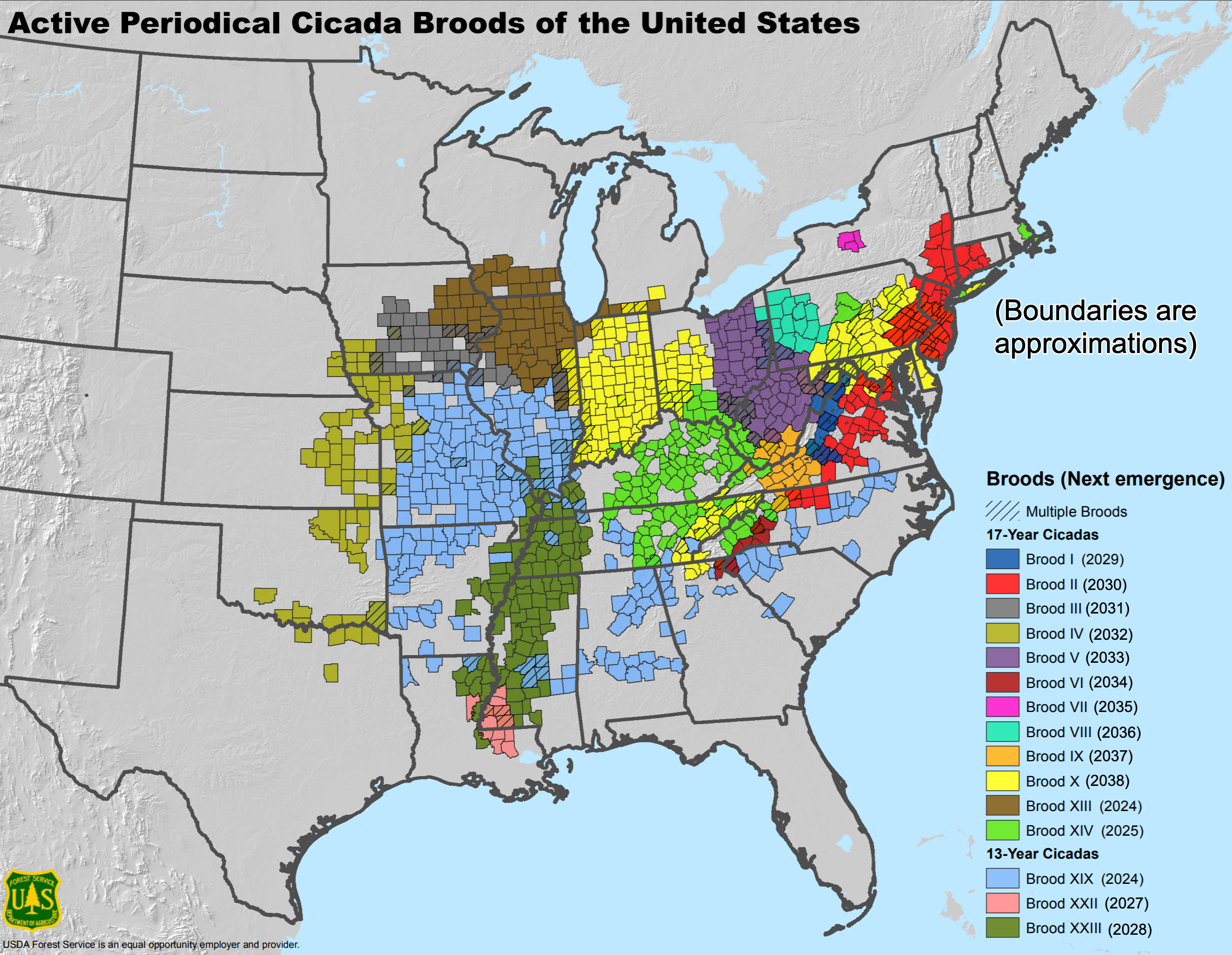
Map of periodic cicada broods with Brood V shown in purple.

Brood V is one of twelve extant broods of periodical cicadas that emerge as adults once every 17 years in North America (three additional broods emerge once every 13 years). They are expected to appear in the eastern half of Ohio, the southwestern corner of Pennsylvania, the upper two-thirds of West Virginia less the Eastern Panhandle, far western Maryland, and some places in Virginia abutting West Virginia. Also included in Brood V is a population that emerges in Suffolk County, Long Island, New York. They last emerged in 2016, and their next appearance will be in 2033.

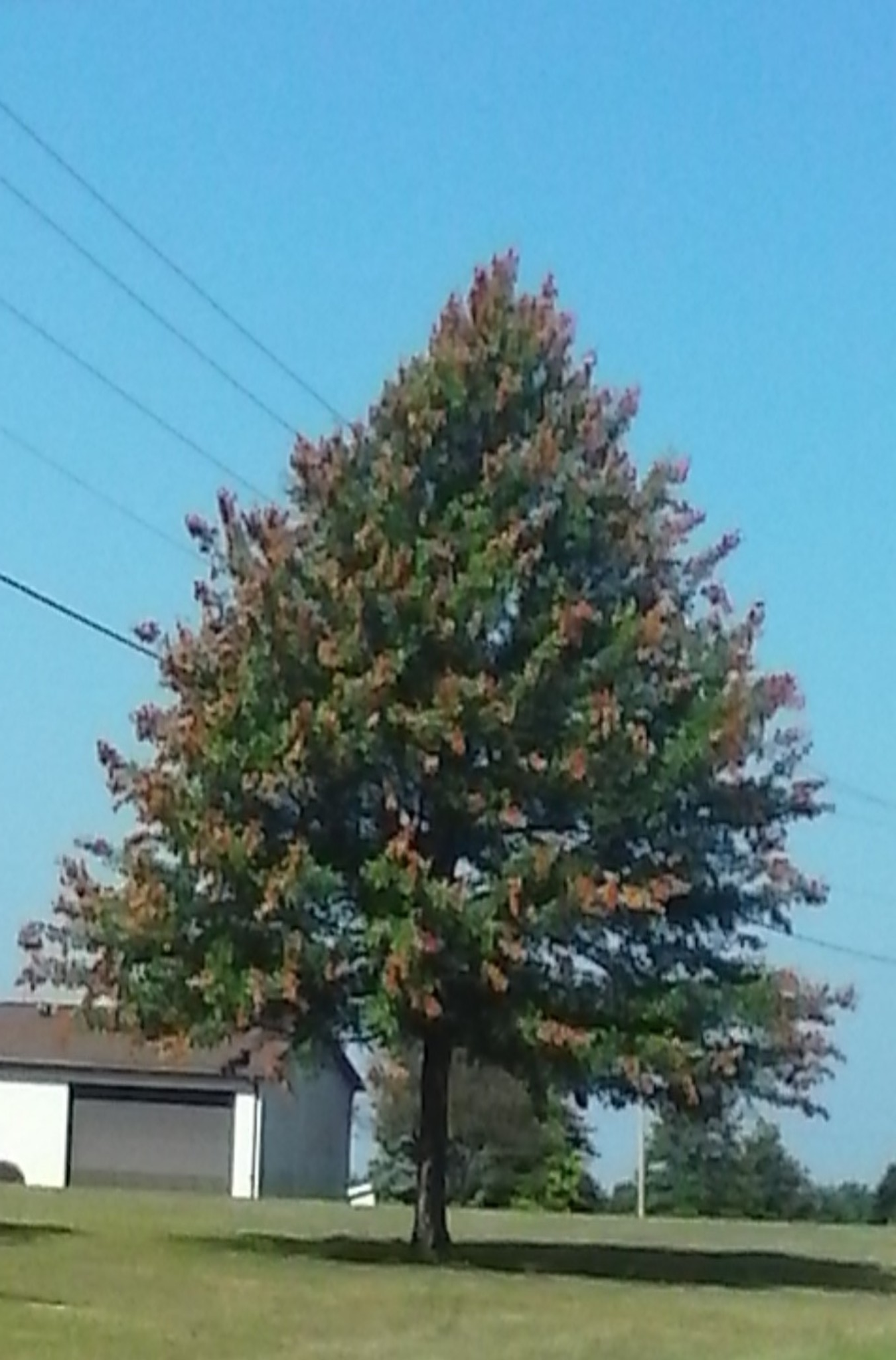
Tree damage in Ohio in 2016

== Emergence ==
For about two weeks prior to emergence, they construct their tunnels, waiting for the temperature in the soil to reach 64 °F (18 °C) about 7–8 inches (18–20 cm) down. They then crawl out of their tunnels, climb up trees, and undergo a molt to the adult form. The males then began calling for mates.

== Species ==
Brood V consists of three species of 17-year cicadas: Magicicada septendecim, Magicicada cassini, and Magicicada septendecula.
