= Brood XXIII =

Periodical cicada brood

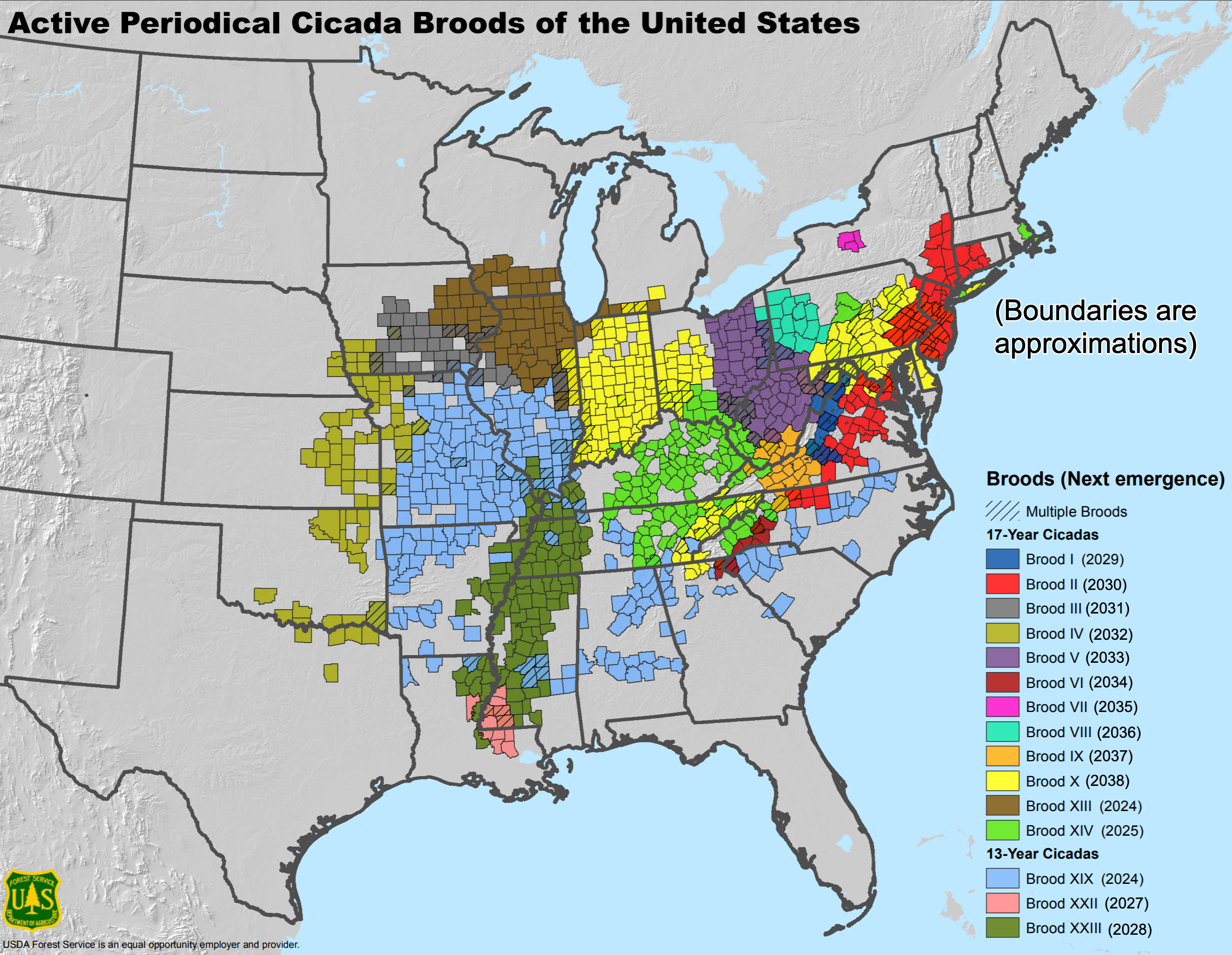
Map of periodic cicada broods with Brood XXIII shown in dark green.

Brood XXIII (also known as the Mississippi Valley Brood) is a brood of 13-year periodical cicadas that last emerged in 2015 around the Mississippi River in the states of Louisiana, Mississippi, Arkansas, Tennessee, Missouri, Kentucky, and Illinois. The brood was also seen in Southwestern Indiana and Western Kentucky around the Ohio River, and as far north as Weldon Springs State Park in DeWitt County, Illinois. Brood XXIII is one of three extant periodical cicada broods with a 13-year life cycle, and thus is expected to be seen again in 2028.

== Life cycle and history ==
Every 13 years Brood XXIII cicadas tunnel en masse to the surface of the ground in late-April to early-June of emergence years to molt, mate, lay eggs, and subsequently die off over the course of a few weeks. After the eggs hatch, the nymphs burrow back underground to further develop and grow for the next 13 years before emerging again, completing the cycle. The extreme number of emerging cicadas is often given as an example of predator satiation.

Brood XXIII was first specifically described in 1845 by Dr. D.L. Pharas of Woodville, Mississippi in a local newspaper, the Woodville Republican.

Brood XXIII is only one of three still living 13-year cicada broods; the other two are Brood XIX (the "Great Southern Brood") and Brood XXII (the "Baton Rouge Brood"). Brood XXI (the "Floridian Brood") was a fourth 13-year brood that was last seen in 1870 in the Florida Panhandle and along the Alabama–Mississippi border. It is presumed extinct.

Beginning with the 2041 emergence, eight successive emergences of Brood XXIII will be dual emergences, together with different Broods of 17-year cicadas: 2041 (with Brood XIII), 2054 (Brood IX), 2067 (Brood V), 2080 (Brood I), 2093 (Brood XIV), 2106 (Brood X), 2119 (Brood VI), and 2132 (Brood II).

== Species present ==
Brood XXIII includes all four 13-year cicada species:

- Magicicada tredecim (Walsh & Riley, 1868)
- Magicicada neotredecim (Marshall & Cooley, 2000)
- Magicicada tredecula (Alexander & Moore, 1962)
- Magicicada tredecassini (Alexander & Moore, 1962)
