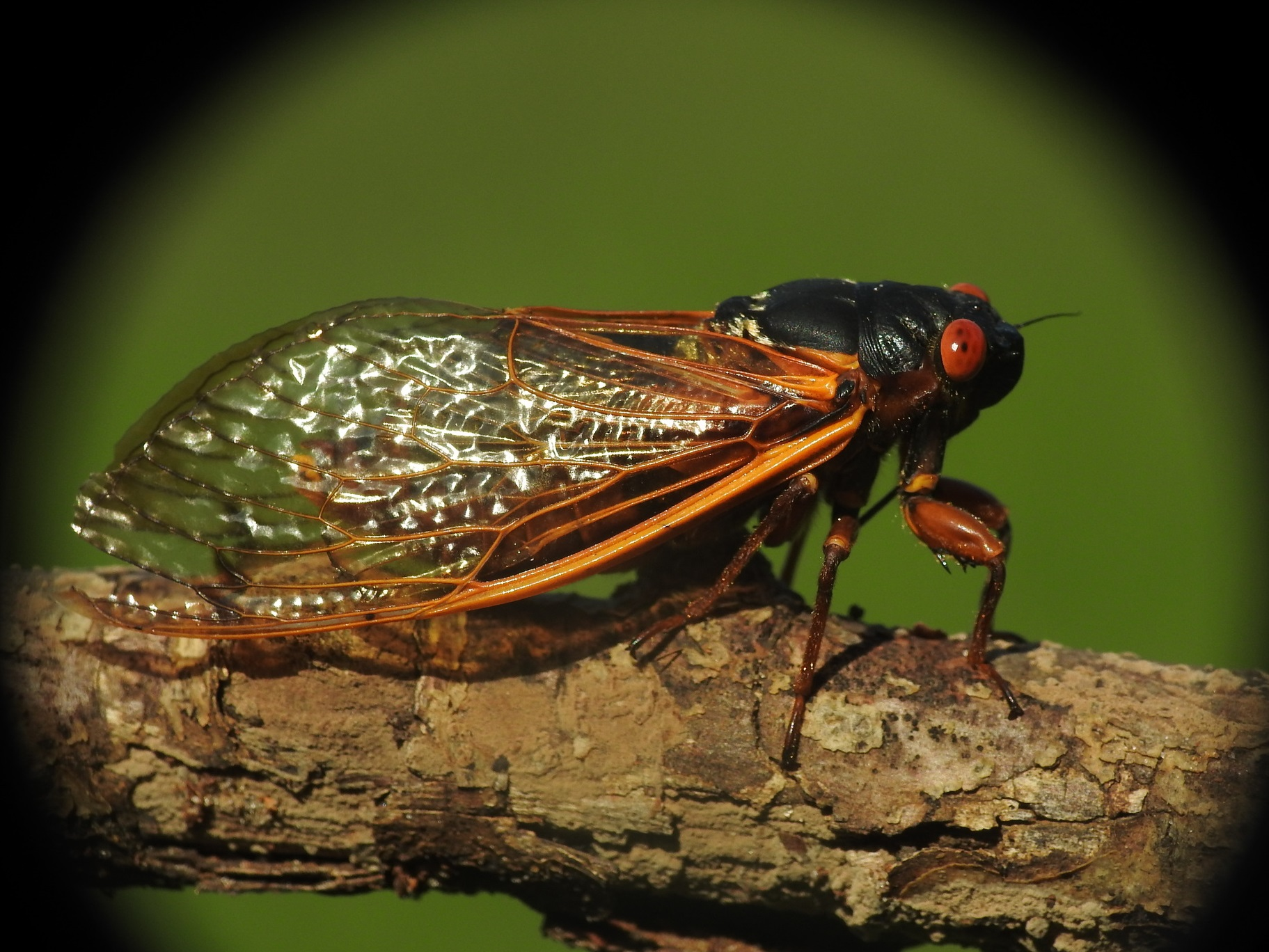

Scientific classification
- Kingdom: Animalia
- Phylum: Arthropoda
- Clade: Pancrustacea
- Class: Insecta
- Order: Hemiptera
- Suborder: Auchenorrhyncha
- Family: Cicadidae
- Genus: Magicicada
- Species: M. tredecim

Binomial name
- Magicicada tredecim (Walsh and Riley, 1868)

= Magicicada tredecim =

Species of true bug

Magicicada tredecim is a 13-year species of periodical cicada, closely related to the newly discovered 13-year species Magicicada neotredecim, from which it differs in male song pitch, female song pitch preferences, abdomen color, and mitochondrial DNA. Both M. tredecim and M. neotredecim are closely related to the 17-year species M. septendecim, which was identified by Linnaeus in 1758; these three species are often grouped together under the name decim periodical cicadas.

== Description ==
Like other species included in its genus, M. tredicim has reddish eyes and wing veins. Its dorsal thorax is black. The underside of the abdomen of M. tredecim is light orange or caramel colored, lacking the dark bands seen in M. neotredicim and M. septendecim.

== Life cycle ==
Their median life cycle from egg to natural adult death is around thirteen years. However, their life cycle can range from nine years to seventeen years.

== Habitat, distribution, and cicada "broods" ==
Magicicada species occur across the southeastern United States. M. tredecim was the first to be described of the four species with a 13-year lifecycle. It has been observed in all of the three extant broods of 13-year cicadas: Brood XIX, Brood XXII, and Brood XXIII.
