= Brood XI =

Extinct periodical cicada brood

Brood XI (Brood 11) was a brood of periodical cicadas that appeared regularly in the eastern United States. It was one of the smallest 17-year broods, consisting exclusively of the species Magicicada septendecim, and was historically restricted to areas of Connecticut, Massachusetts, and Rhode Island which appeared to be at the northern limit of the species' range. Brood XI has not been seen since its 1954 emergence and is now generally regarded as extinct.

== Historical records ==
Brood XI cicadas had historically been reported from scattered areas of the north-eastern United States, with records found going back into the 18th century, such as at Sandwich, Massachusetts. E. C. Herrick saw them "swarming" in the woods of Tolland County in 1835.

By the late 19th century records were already becoming scarce. Entomologist George Dimmock recorded the species in great numbers in Suffield, Connecticut, in 1869 and collected a specimen, but failed to find them in the same location when searching seventeen years later. It was reported by Prof. A. S. Packard from three localities in Rhode Island in 1903, including at a site in the town of Coventry near the southwest end of the Tiogue Reservoir where they covered the scrub oak for an eighth of a mile, but a search in 1920 drew a blank. By the 1920s the lack of reports led some to suggest that the brood had become extinct.

== 1937 emergence ==
To the great interest of entomologists, Brood XI was rediscovered on its 1937 emergence by Prof. Jerauld Manter of the University of Connecticut, who was informed on June 7, 1937, that periodical cicadas had been seen near the town of Willington, Connecticut. On visiting he found what appeared to be a "thriving colony" in pastureland to the east of the town on a farm belonging to a Mr. John Blahusiak. Manter noted references to cicadas being heard in the locality in 1903 and 1920, and observed the colony covering an area of about 10 acres, with "many thousands clinging to the trees". However, he added that given the absence of other reports the colony was probably "the last remnant" of Brood XI.

== 1954 emergence ==
The most recent record of Brood XI cicadas was made, once again, by Manter, who revisited the site in 1954. Cicadas were observed from June 10, but it was noted that "at no time did their numbers approach those of 1937". A visit later in the summer found no evidence of egg laying or consequent wilting of twigs, unlike in 1937, leading to the conclusion that the cicadas were approaching extinction. A search conducted in 1971 at the same site revealed no individuals, and no records of Brood XI have appeared since. Habitat fragmentation and environmental pressures resulting from the area being at the edge of the species' range have been put forward as reasons for the brood's extinction.

== Recent history ==
In 1988, an amateur entomologist believed they had seen a swarm of Brood XI on the outskirts of Chaplin, Connecticut, near the Natchaug State Forest. However, this report was later proven to be inaccurate. While still commonly believed to be extinct, David Marshall of the University of Connecticut has stated that he "would not be surprised if there are small patches of [Brood XI] that have been missed since much of southern New England is not that densely inhabited".
