= Brood IX =

Periodical cicada brood

Brood IX (Brood 9), is one of 15 broods of periodical cicadas that appear regularly throughout the United States in 13 or 17-year intervals. Seventeen-year Brood IX is concentrated in Virginia, West Virginia, and North Carolina.

Every 17 years in select locations in the eastern US, cicadas tunnel en masse to the surface of the ground, mate, lay eggs, and then die off in several weeks. The combination of long dormancy, the simultaneous emergence of vast numbers, and the short period before the nymphs' burrowing underground to safety allows the brood to survive even massive predation. Brood IX remained underground in the Southern United States after emerging in 2003 and next emerged during the spring of 2020. The emergence of Brood IX will not overlap with Brood X in spring 2021.

== Map of brood locations ==
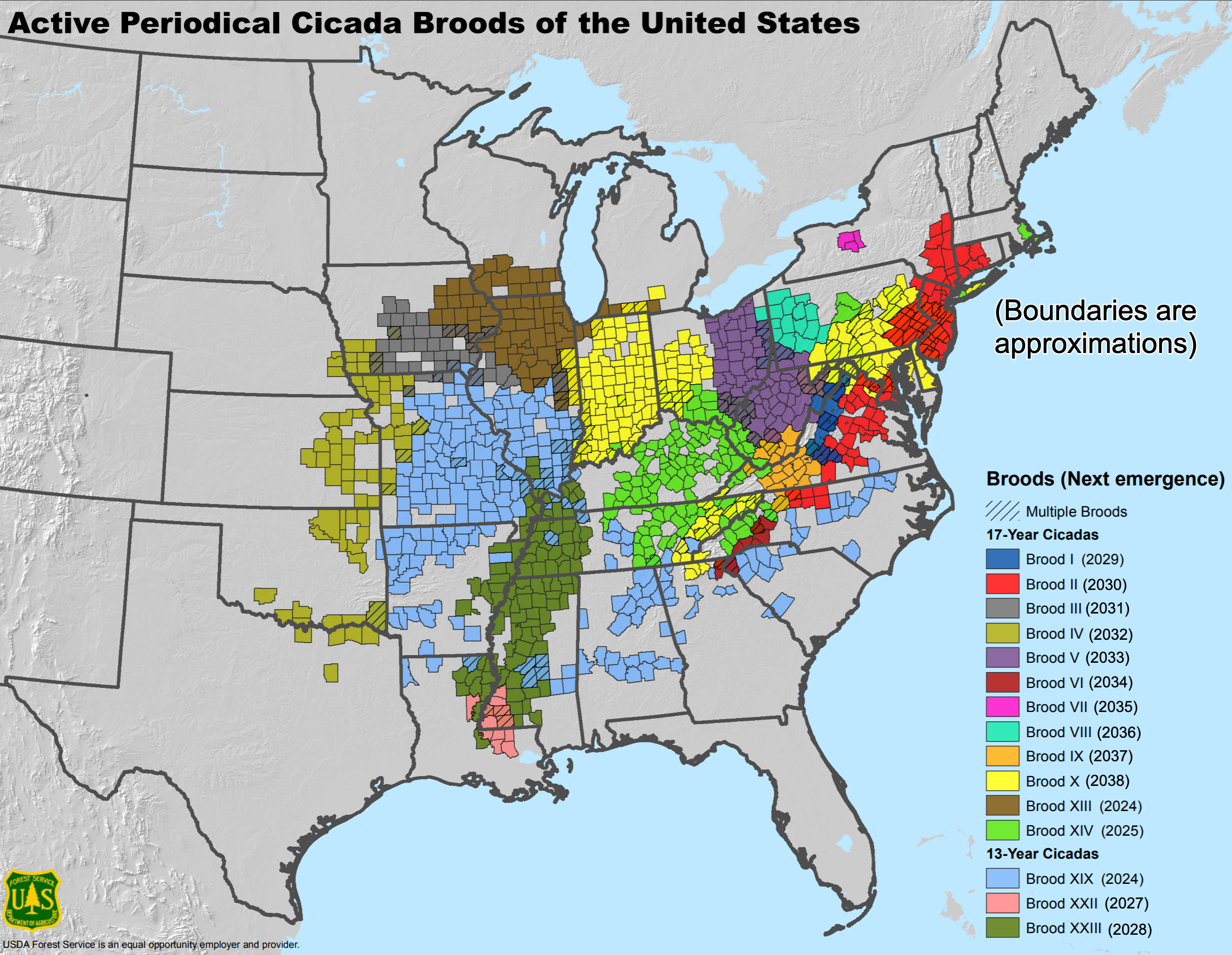
USDA Forest Service map of periodical cicada brood locations and timing of next emergence
