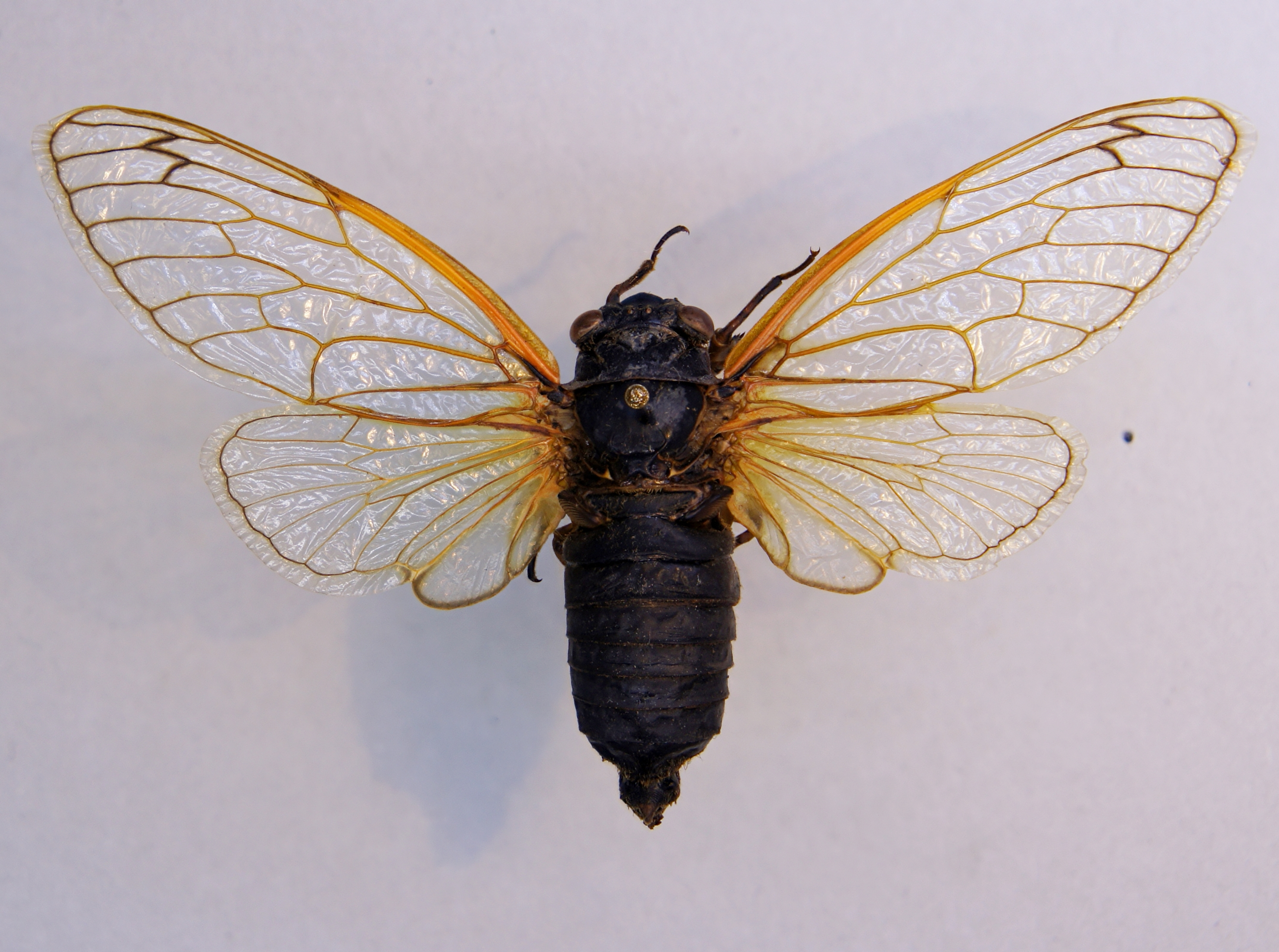
- Specimen of Magicicada septendecim in the Bavarian State Collection of Zoology, Munich (2015)
- A Magicicada chorus with M. septendecim, M. cassini, and M. septendecula

Scientific classification
- Kingdom: Animalia
- Phylum: Arthropoda
- Clade: Pancrustacea
- Class: Insecta
- Order: Hemiptera
- Suborder: Auchenorrhyncha
- Family: Cicadidae
- Subfamily: Cicadettinae
- Tribe: Lamotialnini
- Genus: Magicicada; W. T. Davis, 1925

Type species
- Magicicada septendecim (Linnaeus, 1758)

= Periodical cicadas =

Periodical cicada

Genus of North American cicadas

A periodical cicada is any of the seven species of the genus Magicicada of eastern North America, the 13- and 17-year cicadas. They are called "periodical" because nearly all individuals in a local population are developmentally synchronized and emerge in the same year. Although they are sometimes called "locusts", this is a misnomer, as cicadas belong to the taxonomic order Hemiptera (true bugs), suborder Auchenorrhyncha, while locusts are grasshoppers belonging to the order Orthoptera. Magicicada belongs to the cicada tribe Lamotialnini, a group of genera with representatives in Australia, Africa, and Asia, as well as the Americas.

Magicicada species spend around 99.5% of their lives underground in an immature state called a nymph. While underground, the nymphs feed on xylem fluids from the roots of broadleaf forest trees in the eastern United States. In the spring of their 13th or 17th year, mature cicada nymphs emerge between late April and early June (depending on latitude), synchronously and in tremendous numbers. The adults are active for only about four to six weeks after the unusually prolonged developmental phase.

The males aggregate in chorus centers and call there to attract mates. Mated females lay eggs in the stems of woody plants. Within two months of the original emergence, the life cycle is complete and the adult cicadas die. Later in that same summer, the eggs hatch and the new nymphs burrow underground to develop for the next 13 or 17 years.

Periodical emergences are also reported for the "World Cup cicada" Chremistica ribhoi (every 4 years) in northeast India and for a cicada species from Fiji, Raiateana knowlesi (every 8 years).

== Description ==
Many Brood X periodical cicadas (Magicicada) (video with sound)

The winged imago (adult) periodical cicada has two red compound eyes, three small ocelli, and a black dorsal thorax. The wings are translucent with orange veins. The underside of the abdomen may be black, orange, or striped with orange and black, depending on the species.

Adults are typically 2.4 to 3.3 cm (0.9 to 1.3 in), depending on species, generally about 75% the size of most of the annual cicada species found in the same region. Mature females are slightly larger than males.

Magicicada males typically form large aggregations that sing in chorus to attract receptive females. Different species have different characteristic calling songs. The call of decim periodical cicadas is said to resemble someone calling "weeeee-whoa" or "Pharaoh". The cassini and decula periodical cicadas (including M. tredecula) have songs that intersperse buzzing and ticking sounds.

Cicadas cannot sting and do not normally bite. Like other Auchenorrhyncha (true) bugs, they have mouthparts used to pierce plants and suck their sap. These mouthparts are used during the nymph stage to tap underground roots for water, minerals and carbohydrates and in the adult stage to acquire nutrients and water from plant stems. An adult cicada's proboscis can pierce human skin when it is handled, which is painful but in no other way harmful. Cicadas are neither venomous nor poisonous and there is no evidence that they or their bites can transmit diseases.

Oviposition by female periodical cicadas damages pencil-sized twigs of woody vegetation. Mature trees rarely suffer lasting damage, although peripheral twig die-off or "flagging" may result. Planting young trees or shrubs is best postponed until after an expected emergence of the periodical cicadas. Existing young trees or shrubs can be covered with cheesecloth or other mesh netting with holes that are 3/8 in (1.0 cm) in diameter or smaller to prevent damage during the oviposition period, which begins about a week after the first adults emerge and lasts until all females have died.

== Life cycle ==
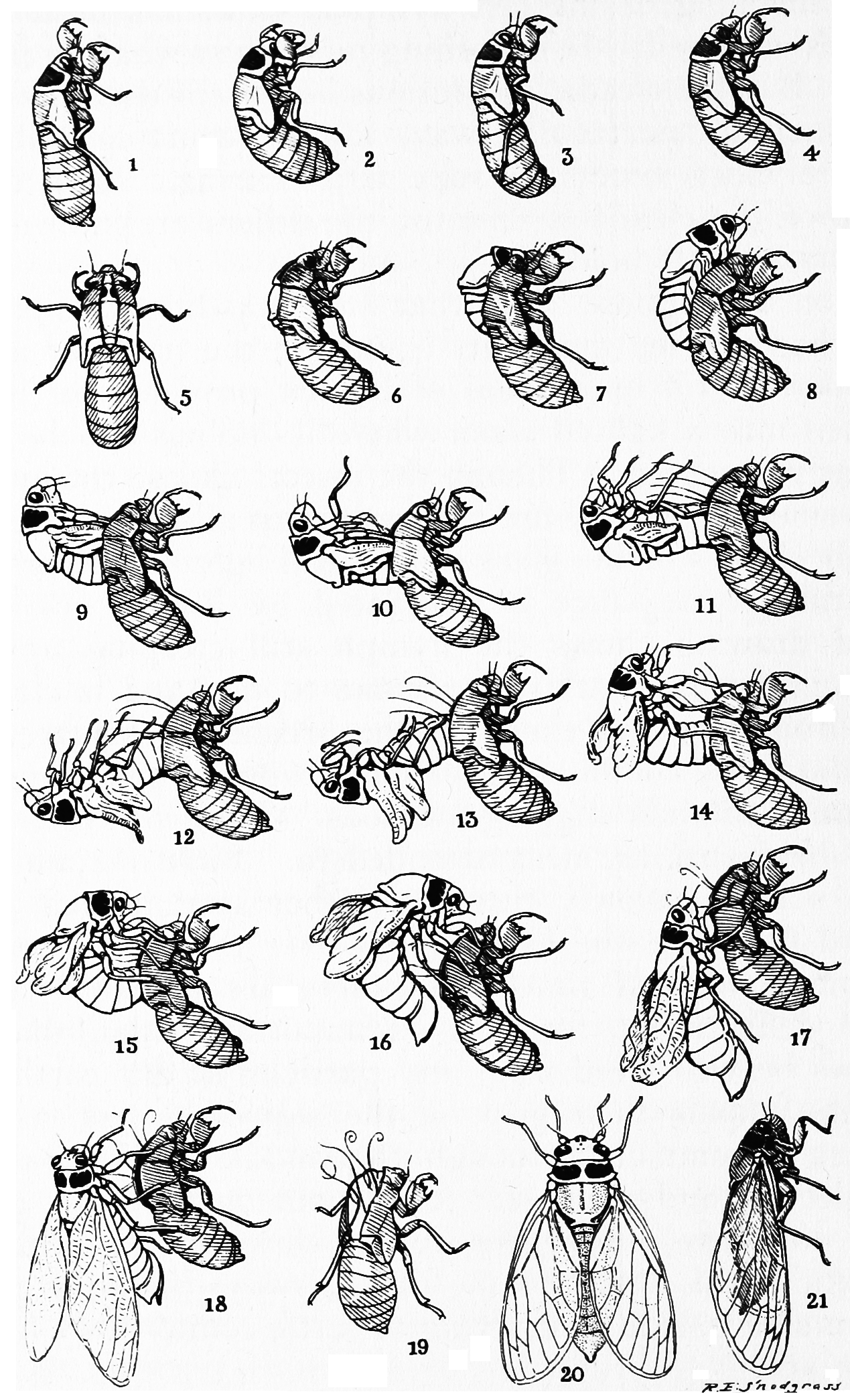
Transformation from mature nymph to adult

Time-lapse of final molt and darkening, over 4.5 hours

Emergence. Nearly all at once. Many do not survive, but with mass emergence, many will reach maturity to start the next generation.

Adult cicada female creating a slit in twig and inserting eggs. The sound is of thousands of cicadas.

Nearly all cicadas spend years underground as juveniles, before emerging above ground for a short adult stage of several weeks to a few months. The seven periodical cicada species are so named because, in any one location, all members of the population are developmentally synchronized—they emerge as adults all at once in the same year. This periodicity is especially remarkable because their life cycles are so long—13 or 17 years.

In contrast, for nonperiodical species, some adults mature each summer and emerge while the rest of the population continues to develop underground. Many people refer to these nonperiodical species as annual cicadas because some are seen every summer. This may lead some to conclude that the non-periodic cicadas have life cycles of 1 year. This is incorrect. The few known life cycles of "annual" species range from two to 10 years, although some could be longer.

The nymphs of the periodical cicadas live underground, usually within 2 ft (61 cm) of the surface, feeding on the juices of plant roots. The nymphs of the periodical cicada undergo five instar stages in their development underground. The difference in the 13- and 17-year life cycle is said to be the time needed for the second instar to mature. When underground the nymphs move deeper below ground, detecting and then feeding on larger roots as they mature.

The nymphs seem to track the number of years by detecting the changes in the xylem caused by abscission of the tree. This was supported experimentally by inducing a grove of trees to go through two cycles of losing and re-growing leaves in one calendar year. Cicadas feeding on those trees emerged after 16 years instead of 17.

In late April to early June of the emergence year, mature fifth-instar nymphs construct tunnels to the surface and wait for the soil temperature to reach a critical value. In some situations, nymphs extend mud turrets up to several inches above the soil surface. The function of these turrets is not known, but the phenomenon has been observed in some nonperiodical cicadas, as well as other tunneling insects.

The nymphs first emerge on a spring evening when the soil temperature at around 20 cm (8 in) of depth is above 17.9 °C (64 °F). The crepuscular emergence is thought to be related to the fact that maximum soil temperatures lag behind maximum insolation by several hours, conveniently providing some protection for the flightless nymphs against diurnal sight predators such as birds. For the rest of their lives the mature periodical cicadas will be strongly diurnal, with song often nearly ceasing at night.

During most years in the United States this emergence cue translates to late April or early May in the far south, and late May to early June in the far north. Emerging nymphs may molt in the grass or climb from a few centimeters (inches) to more than 100 feet (30 m) to find a suitable vertical surface to complete their transformation into adults. After securing themselves to tree trunks, the walls of buildings, telephone poles, fenceposts, hanging foliage, and even stationary automobile tires, the nymphs undergo a final molt and then spend about six days in the trees to await the complete hardening of their wings and exoskeletons. Just after emerging from this final molt the teneral adults are off-white, but darken within an hour.

Adult periodical cicadas live for only a few weeks; by mid-July, all have died. Their ephemeral adult forms are adapted for one purpose: reproduction. Like other cicadas the males produce a very loud species-specific mating song using their tymbals. Singing males of the same Magicicada species tend to form aggregations called choruses whose collective songs are attractive to females. Males in these choruses alternate bouts of singing with short flights from tree to tree in search of receptive females. Most matings occur in so-called chorus trees.

Receptive females respond to the calls of conspecific males with timed wing-flicks (visual signaling is apparently a necessity in the midst of the males' song) which attract the males for mating. The sound of a chorus can be literally deafening and depending on the number of males composing it, may reach 100 dB in the immediate vicinity. In addition to their "calling" or "congregating" songs, males produce a distinctive courtship song when approaching an individual female.

Both males and females can mate multiple times, although most females seem to mate only once. After mating, the female cuts V-shaped slits in the bark of young twigs and lays about 20 eggs in each, for a total clutch of 600 or more. After about 6–10 weeks, the eggs hatch and the nymphs drop to the ground, where they burrow and begin another 13- or 17-year cycle.

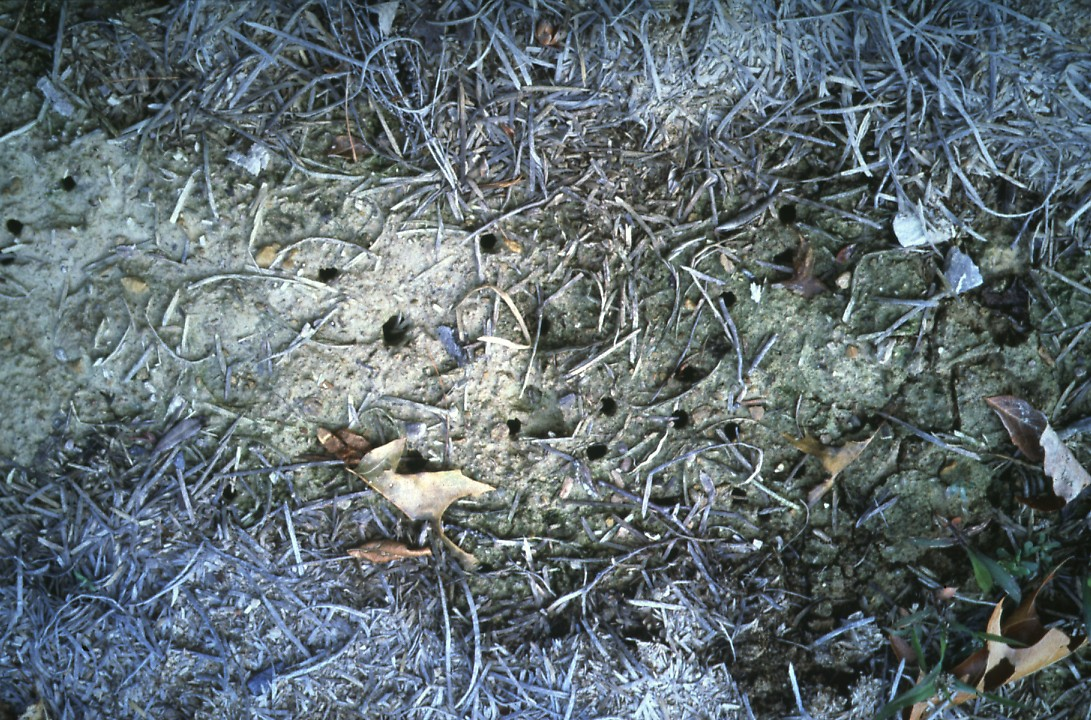
Magicicada nymph emergence holes

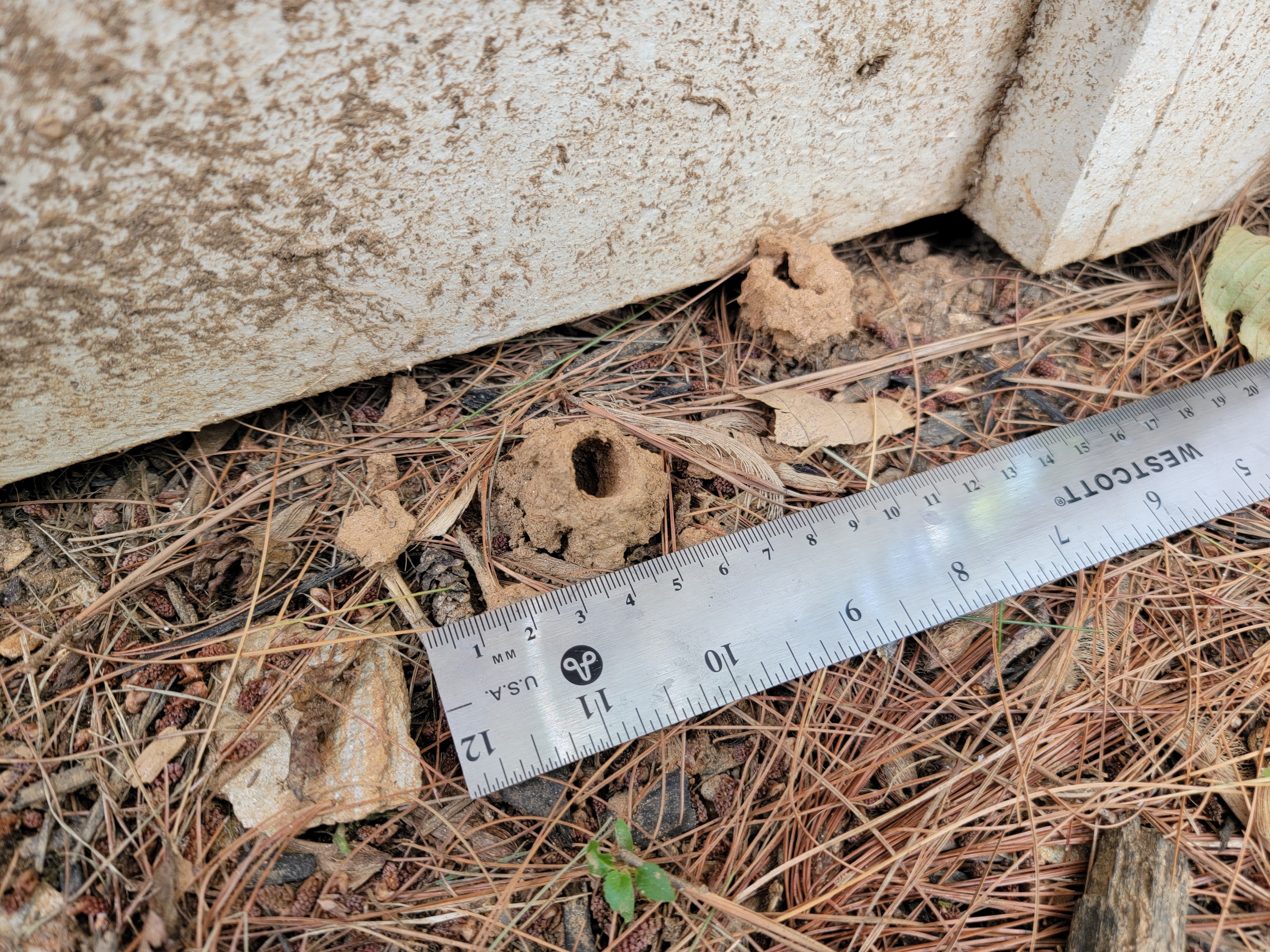
Mud turrets that emergent Brood X Magicicada nymphs created in Potomac, Maryland near Washington, D.C. (June 30, 2021)

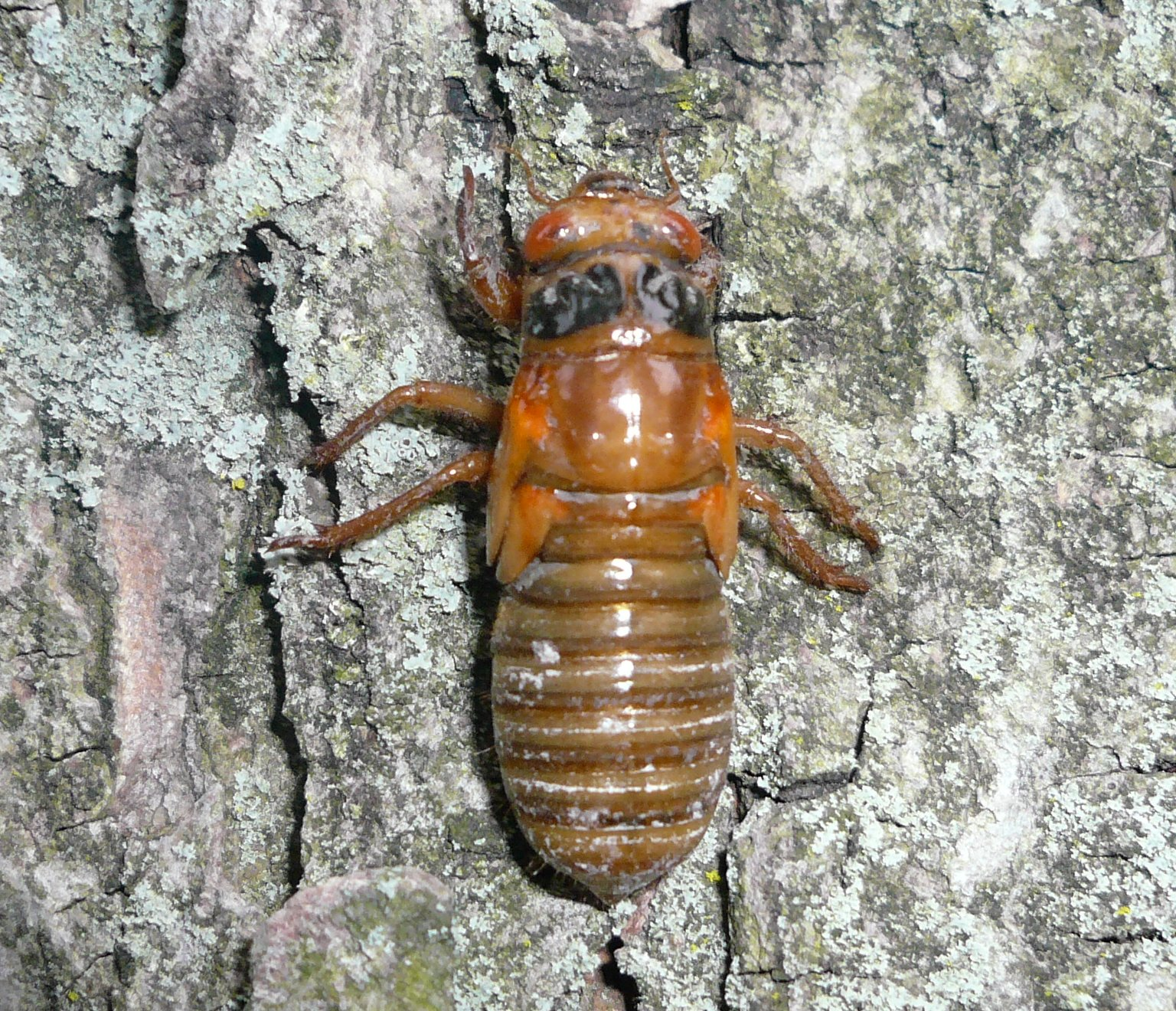
Brood XIII Magicicada nymph prior to final molt in suburban Chicago (May 24, 2007)

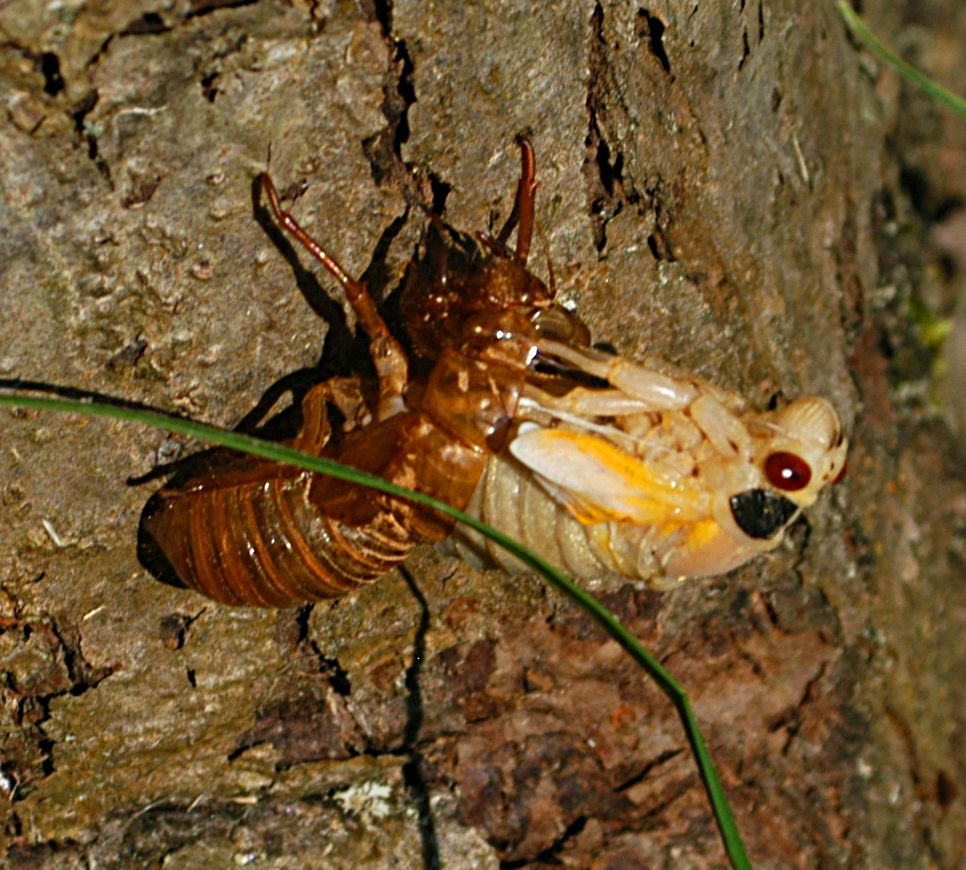
Magicicada molting

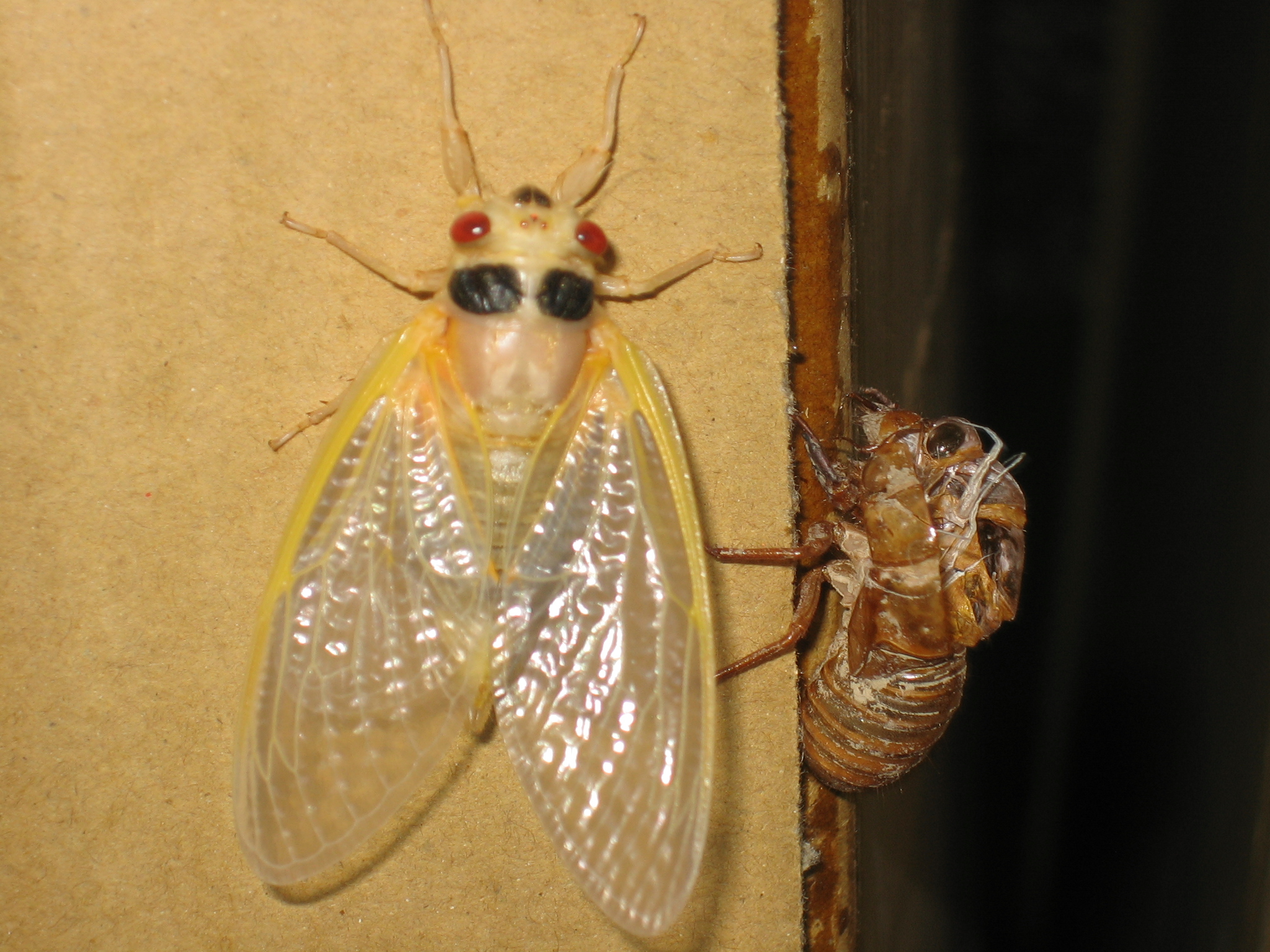
Teneral adult Brood XIII Magicicada and exuviae after molting in Highland Park, Illinois near Chicago. (May 2007)

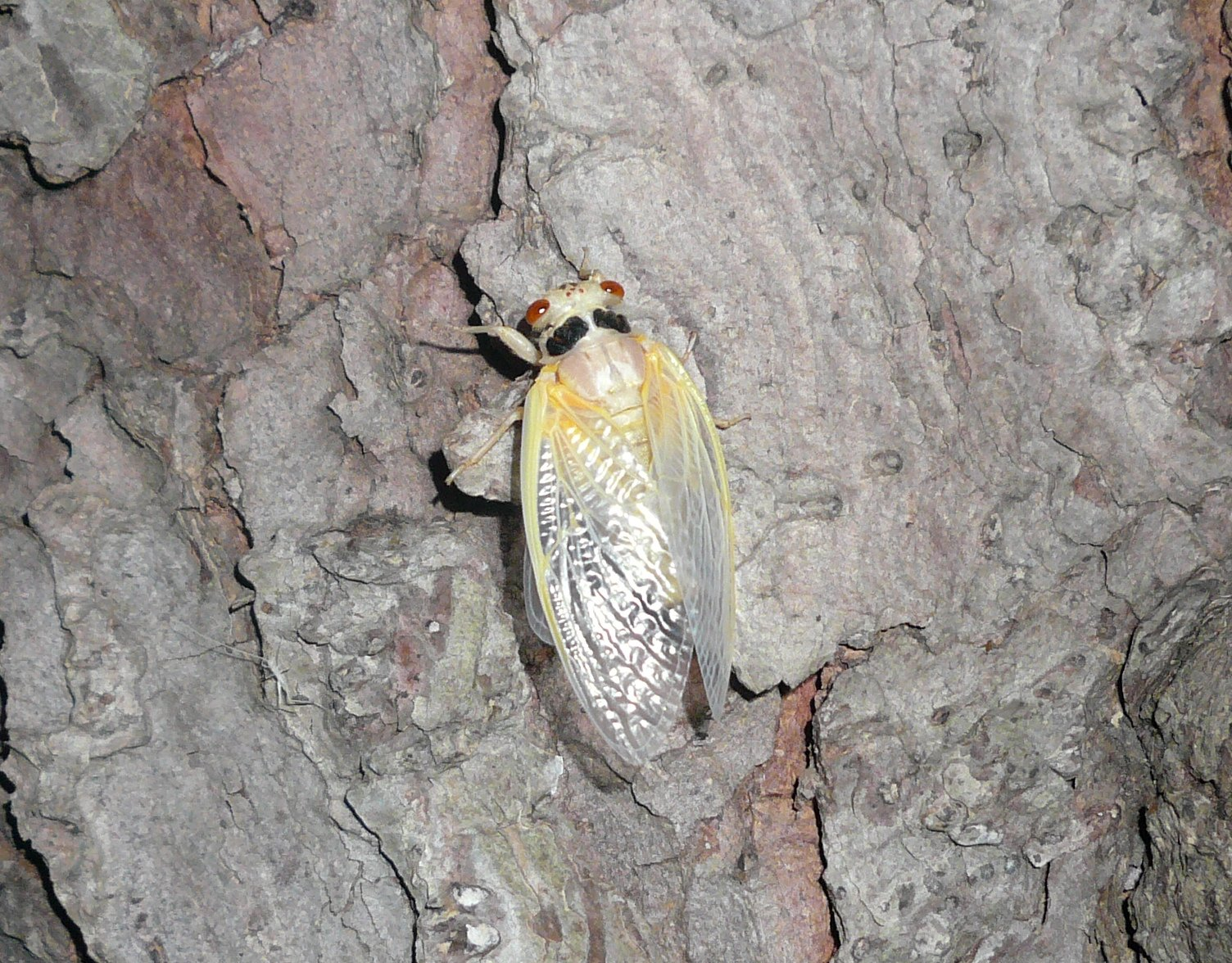
Teneral adult Brood XIII Magicicada in suburban Chicago (May 24, 2007)

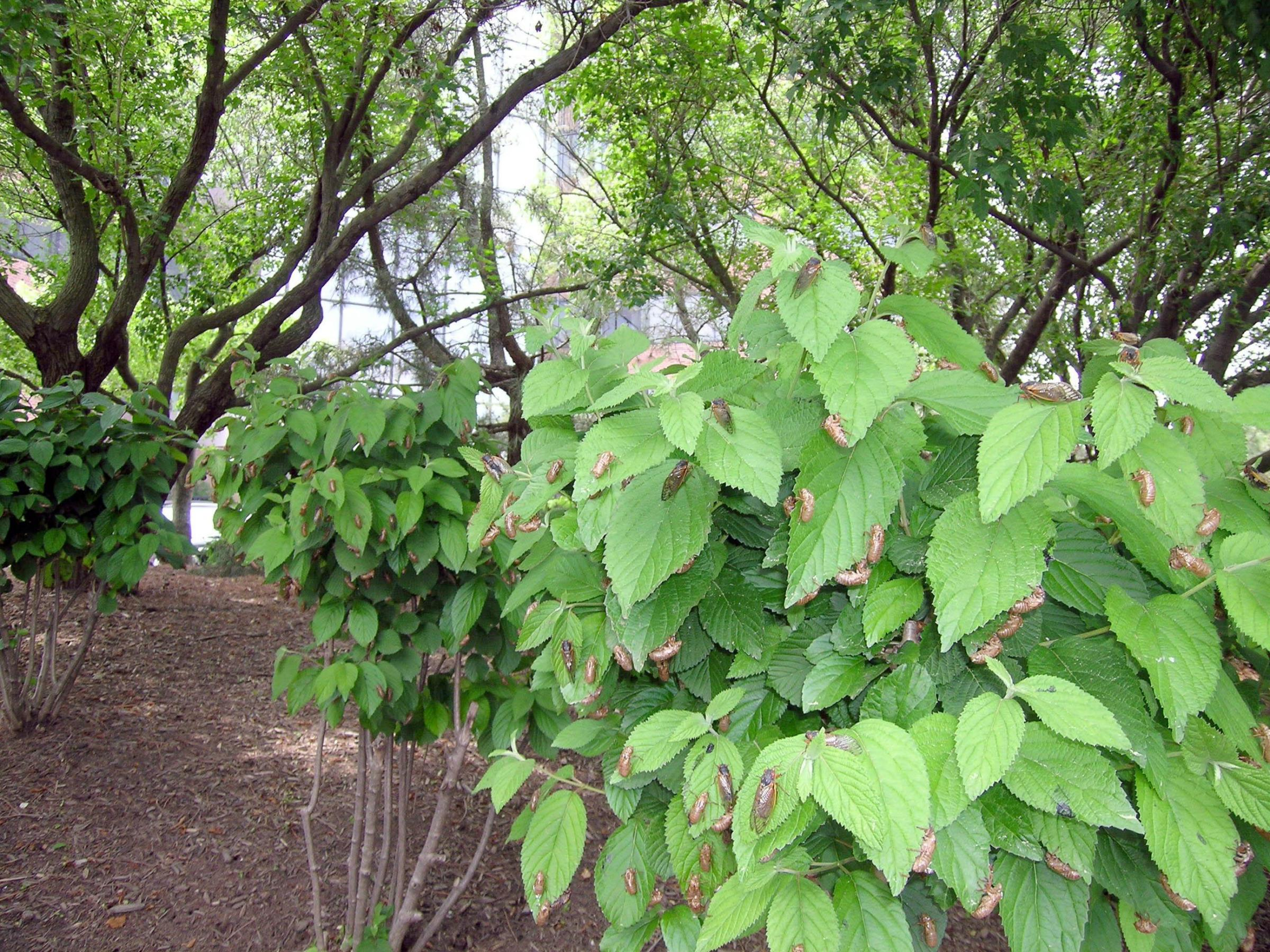
Mass of Magicicada Teneral adults and exuviae on vegetation

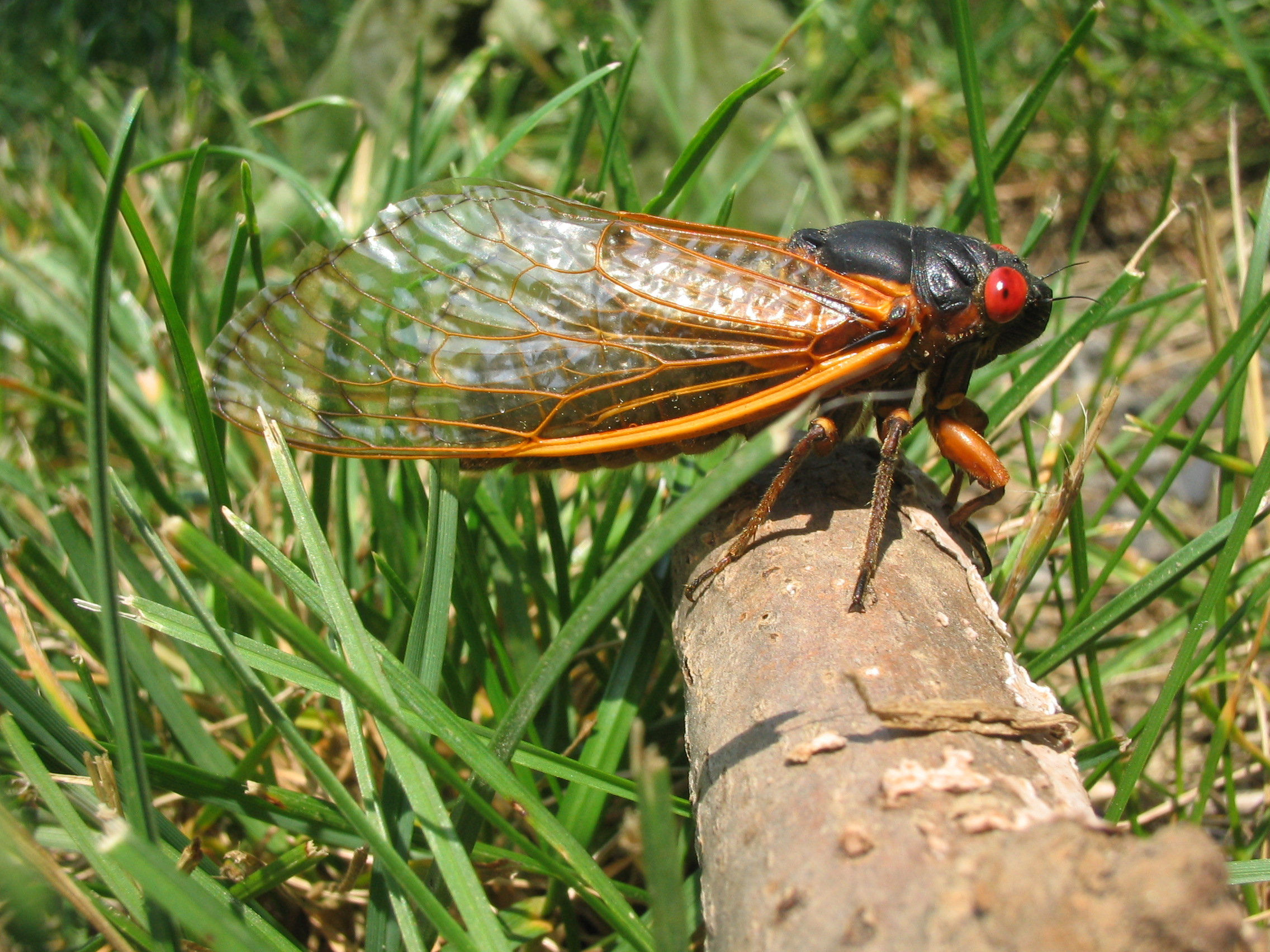
An adult Brood X Magicicada septendecim in Princeton, New Jersey (June 6, 2004)

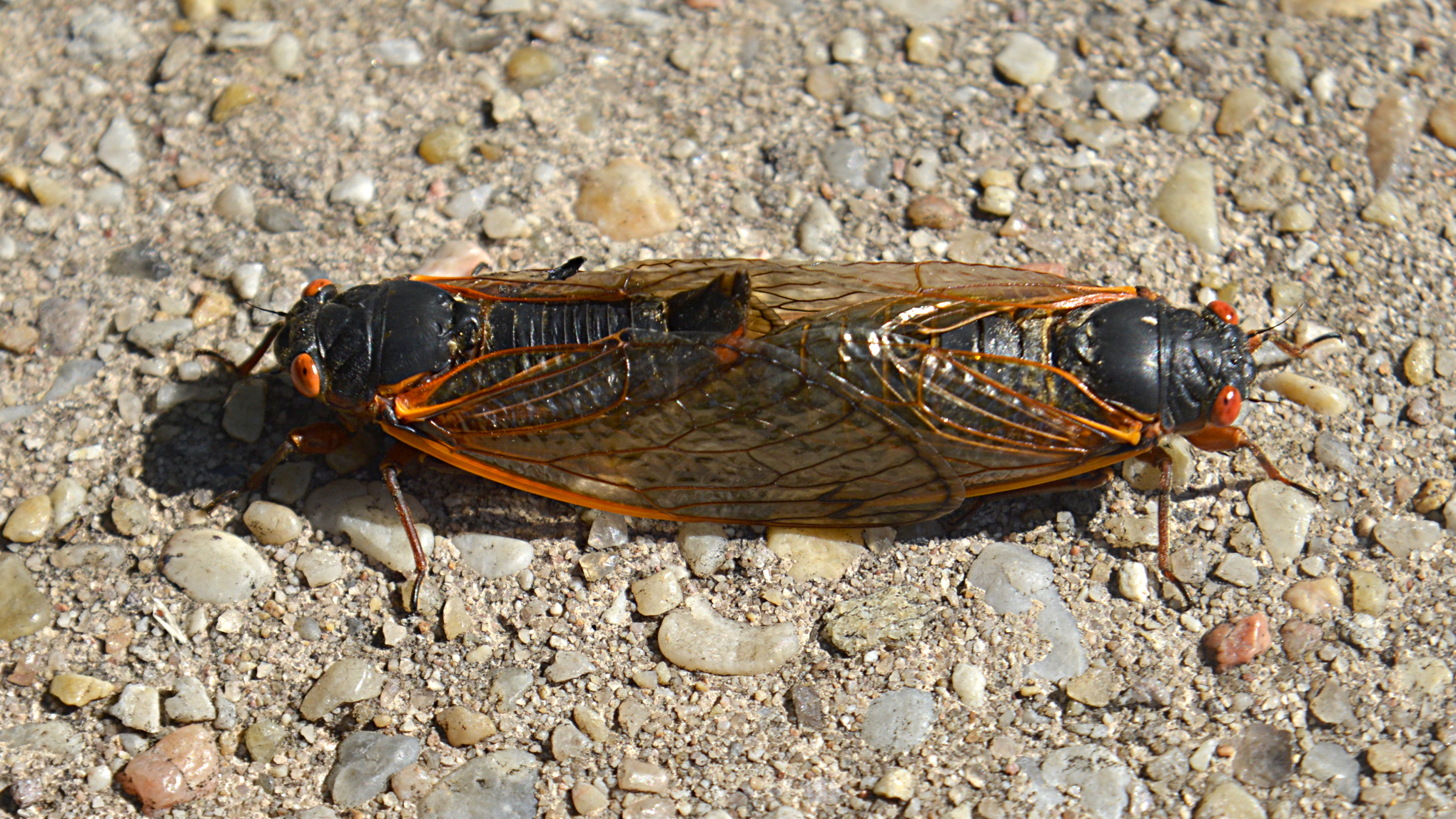
Two Brood X Magicicadas mating in Bethesda, Maryland near Washington, D.C. (May 31, 2021)

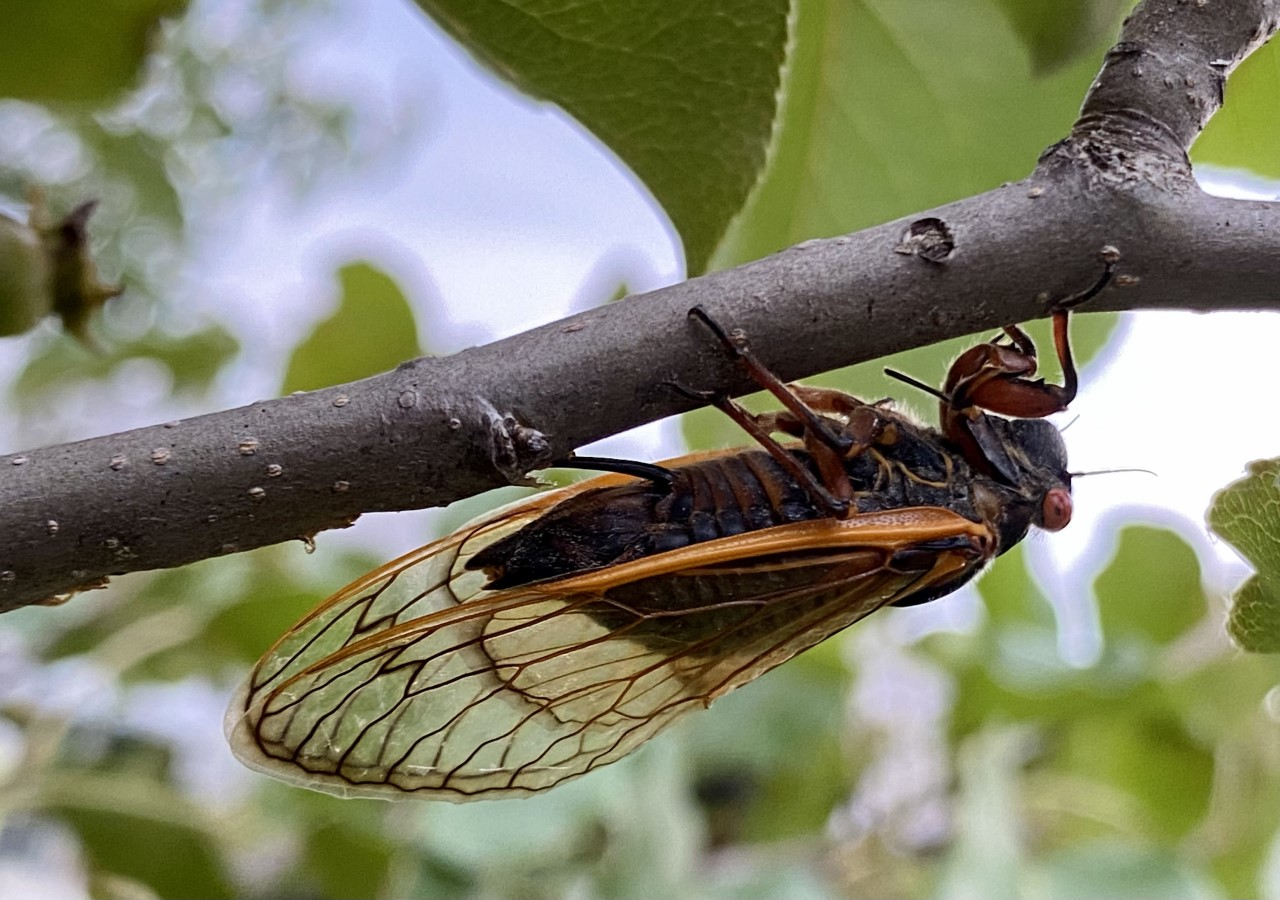
A Brood X Magicicada ovipositing eggs in a tree branch near Baltimore, Maryland (May 26, 2021)

A Brood X Magicicada laying eggs in a tree branch (video) (June 1, 2021)

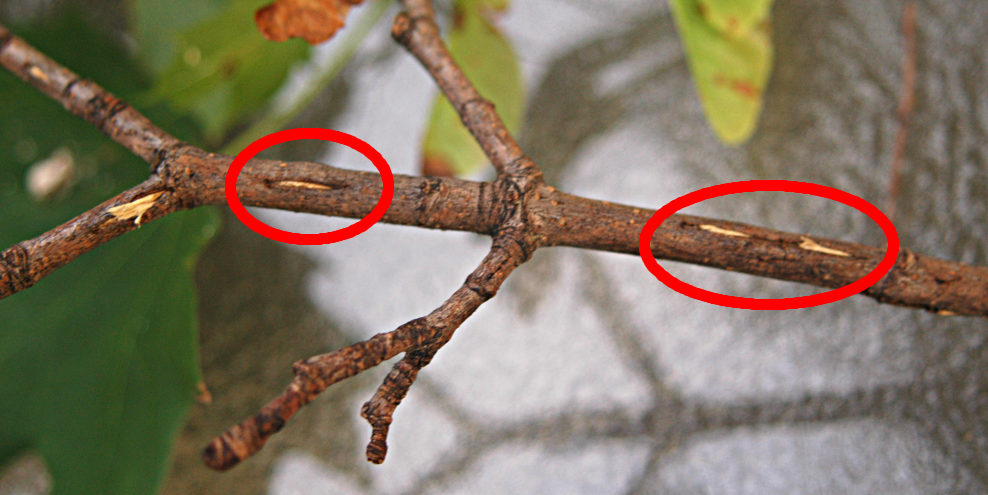
Magicicada egg slits (circled in red) (June 6, 2004)

== Predator satiation survival strategy ==
The nymphs emerge in very large numbers at nearly the same time, sometimes more than 1.5 million individuals per acre (370 individuals per m^{2}). Their mass emergence is, among other things, an adaptation called predator satiation. Although periodical cicadas are easy prey for reptiles, birds, squirrels, cats, dogs and other small and large mammals, there are after synchronized emergence simply too many individuals for the predators to consume; many individuals thus remain behind to procreate.

It has been hypothesized that the prime-number development times (13 and 17 years) improve avoidance of predators with shorter reproductive cycles and for this reason have been selected for. A predator with, for example, a three-year reproductive cycle, which happened to benefit from a brood emergence in a given year, will have gone through either four cycles plus one year (12 + 1) or five cycles plus two years (15 + 2) by the next time that the same brood emerges. In this way cicada generations always emerge when some portion of the predators they will confront are sexually immature and therefore incapable of taking maximum advantage of the momentarily limitless food supply.

A second hypothesis posits that the prime-numbered developmental times are an adaptation that prevents hybridization between broods. Under extremely harsh conditions, mutations producing extremely long development times are selected for. A mechanism, such as reproducing only after prime-numbered intervals, that reduces the frequency of cicadas mating with cicadas that may lack the long-development trait will also be selected for. The North American Pleistocene glacial stadia are instances of such extremely harsh conditions. On this hypothesis, predator satiation reinforces a longer-term survival strategy of protecting the long-development trait from hybridizations that might dilute it. This hypothesis has been supported by mathematical modeling.

The length of the cycle was hypothesized to be controlled by a single gene locus, with the 13-year cycle dominant to the 17-year one, but this interpretation remains controversial and unsubstantiated at the level of DNA.

=== Impact on other populations ===
Cycles in cicada populations are significant enough to affect other animal and plant populations. For example, tree growth has been observed to decline the year before the emergence of a brood because of the increased feeding on roots by the growing nymphs. Moles, which feed on nymphs, have been observed to do well during the year before an emergence, but suffer population declines the following year because of the reduced food source. Wild turkey populations respond favorably to increased nutrition in their food supply from gorging on cicada adults on the ground at the end of their life cycles. Uneaten carcasses of periodical cicadas decompose on the ground, providing a resource pulse of nutrients to the forest community.

Cicada broods may also have a negative impact. Eastern gray squirrel populations have been negatively affected, because the egg-laying activity of female cicadas damaged upcoming mast crops.

== Broods ==
Periodical cicadas are grouped into geographic broods based on the calendar year when they emerge. For example, in 2014, the 13-year Brood XXII emerged in Louisiana and the 17-year Brood III emerged in western Illinois and eastern Iowa.

In a 1907 journal article, entomologist Charles Lester Marlatt assigned Roman numerals to 30 different broods of periodical cicadas: 17 distinct broods with a 17-year life cycle, to which he assigned brood numbers I through XVII (with emerging years 1893 through 1909); plus 13 broods with a 13-year cycle, to which he assigned brood numbers XVIII through XXX (1893 through 1905). Marlatt noted that the 17-year broods are generally more northerly than are the 13-year broods.

Many of these hypothetical 30 broods have not been observed. Marlatt noted that some cicada populations (especially Brood XI in the valley of the Connecticut River in Massachusetts and Connecticut) were disappearing, a fact that he attributed to the reduction in forests and the introduction and proliferation of insect-eating "English sparrows" (House sparrows, Passer domesticus) that had followed the European settlement of North America. Two of the broods that Marlatt named (Broods XI and XXI) have become extinct. His numbering scheme has been retained for convenience (and because it clearly separates 13- and 17-year life cycles), although only 15 broods are known to survive.

Name	Nickname	Cycle (yrs)	Last emergence	Next emergence	Extent
Brood I	Blue Ridge brood	17	2012	2029	Western Virginia, West Virginia
Brood II	East Coast brood	17	2013	2030	Connecticut, Maryland, North Carolina, New Jersey, New York, Pennsylvania, Delaware, Virginia, District of Columbia
Brood III	Iowan brood	17	2014	2031	Iowa
Brood IV	Kansan brood	17	2015	2032	Eastern Nebraska, southwestern Iowa, eastern Kansas, western Missouri, Oklahoma, north Texas
Brood V		17	2016	2033	Eastern Ohio, Western Maryland, Southwestern Pennsylvania, Northwestern Virginia, West Virginia, New York (Suffolk County)
Brood VI		17	2017	2034	Northern Georgia, western North Carolina, northwestern South Carolina
Brood VII	Onondaga brood	17	2018	2035	Central New York (Onondaga, Cayuga, Seneca, Ontario, Yates counties) (Note: Consists only of M. septendecim)
Brood VIII		17	2019	2036	Eastern Ohio, western Pennsylvania, northern West Virginia
Brood IX		17	2020	2037	southwestern Virginia, southern West Virginia, western North Carolina
Brood X	Great eastern brood	17	2021	2038	New York, New Jersey, Pennsylvania, Delaware, Maryland, District of Columbia, Virginia, West Virginia, North Carolina, Georgia, Tennessee, Kentucky, Ohio, Indiana, Illinois, Michigan (Note: A premature emergence occurred in 2017.)
Brood XI		17	1954	Extinct	Connecticut, Massachusetts, Rhode Island. Last seen in 1954 in Ashford, Connecticut along the Fenton River
Brood XIII	Northern Illinois brood	17	2024	2041	Northern Illinois and in parts of Iowa, Wisconsin, and Indiana (Note: Reputedly has the largest emergence of cicadas by size known anywhere. A premature emergence occurred in 2020.)
Brood XIV		17	2025	2042	Southern Ohio, Kentucky, Tennessee, Massachusetts, Maryland, North Carolina, Pennsylvania, northern Georgia, Southwestern Virginia and West Virginia, and parts of New York and New Jersey
Brood XIX	Great Southern Brood	13	2024	2037	Alabama, Arkansas, Georgia, Indiana, Illinois, Kentucky, Louisiana, Maryland, Missouri, Mississippi, North Carolina, Oklahoma, South Carolina, Tennessee, and Virginia (Note: Arguably the largest (by geographic extent) of all periodical cicada broods.)
Brood XXI	Floridian Brood	13	1870	Extinct	Last recorded in 1870, historical range included the Florida panhandle
Brood XXII	Baton Rouge Brood	13	2014	2027	Louisiana, Mississippi (Note: This 13-year brood does not include M. neotredecim.)
Brood XXIII	Mississippi Valley Brood	13	2015	2028	Arkansas, Illinois, Indiana, Kentucky, Louisiana, Missouri, Mississippi, Tennessee

Periodical cicadas that emerge outside the expected time frame are called stragglers. Although they can emerge at any time, they usually do so one or four years before or after most other members of their broods emerge. Stragglers with a 17-year life cycle typically emerge four years early. Those with a 13-year cycle typically emerge four years late. The emergence of stragglers may in theory be indicative of a brood shifting from a 17-year cycle to a 13-year one.

Brood XIII of the 17-year cicada, which reputably has the largest emergence of cicadas by size known anywhere, and Brood XIX of the 13-year cicada, arguably the largest (by geographic extent) of all periodical cicada broods, were expected to emerge together in 2024 for the first time since 1803. However, the two broods were not expected to overlap except potentially in a thin area in central and eastern Illinois (Macon, Sangamon, Livingston, and Logan counties). The next such dual emergence of these two particular broods will occur in 2245, 221 years after 2024. Many other 13-year and 17-year broods emerge during the same years, but the broods are not geographically close.

=== Map of brood locations ===
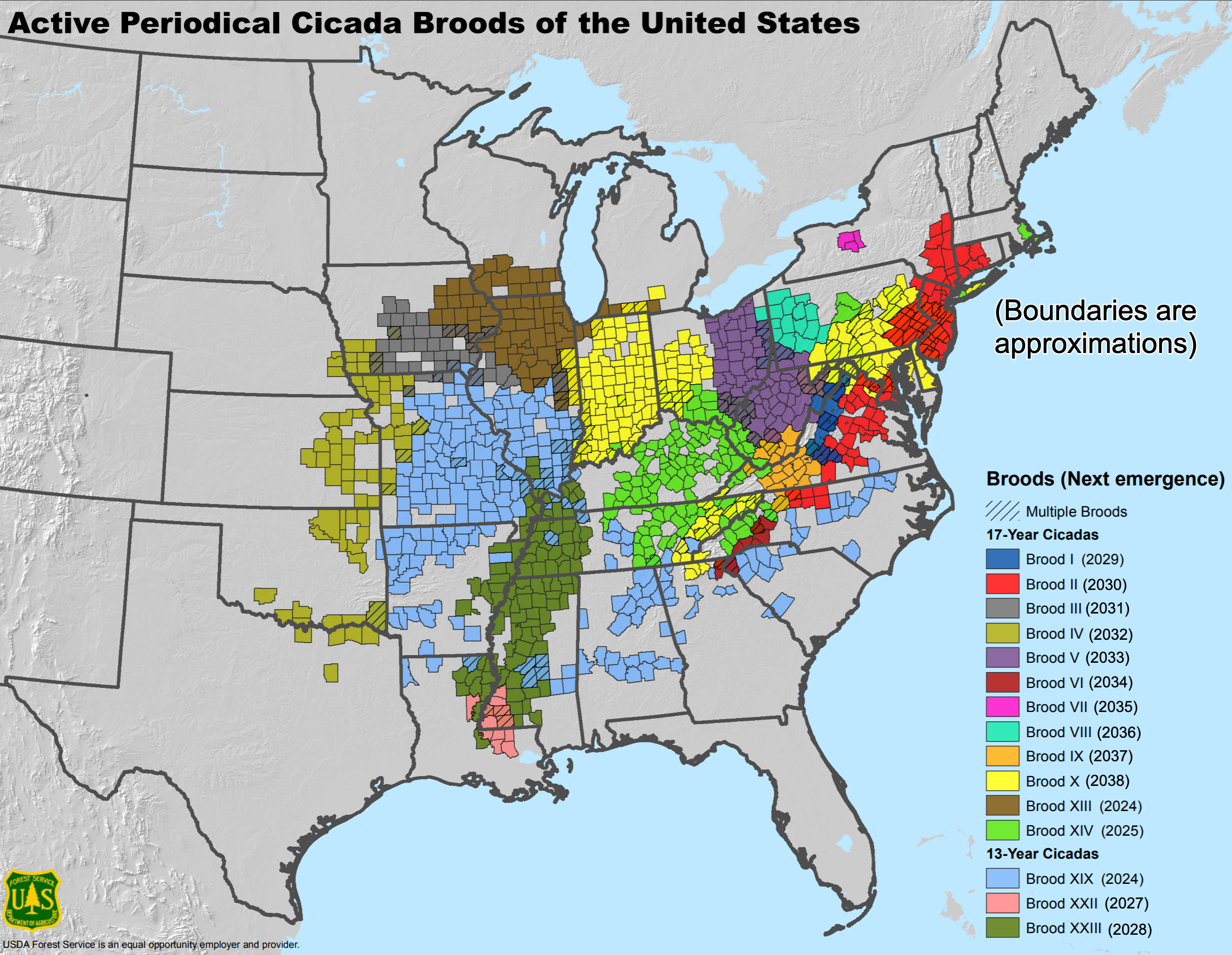
USDA Forest Service map of periodical cicada brood locations by county and timing of next emergence (as of 2024)

== Taxonomy ==
=== Phylogeny ===
Magicicada is a member of the cicada tribe Lamotialnini, which is distributed globally aside from South America. Despite Magicicada being only found in eastern North America, its closest relatives are thought to be the genera Tryella and Aleeta from Australia, with Magicicada being sister to the clade containing Tryella and Aleeta. Within the Americas, its closest relative is thought to be the genus Chrysolasia from Guatemala.

=== Species ===
Seven recognized species are placed within Magicicada—three 17-year species and four 13-year species. These seven species are also sometimes grouped differently into three subgroups, the so-called Decim species group, Cassini species group, and Decula species group, reflecting strong similarities of each 17-year species with one or more species with a 13-year cycle.

17-year cycle				Species group	13-year cycle			
Image	Scientific name	Common name	Distribution	Species group	Image	Scientific name	Common name	Distribution
	M. septendecim (Linnaeus, 1758)	17-year locust, Pharaoh cicada	Canada, United States	Decim		M. tredecim (Walsh & Riley, 1868)		Southeastern; United States
	M. septendecim (Linnaeus, 1758)	17-year locust, Pharaoh cicada	Canada, United States	Decim		M. neotredecim Marshall & Cooley, 2000		United States
	M. cassini (Fisher, 1852)	17-year cicada, dwarf periodical cicada	United States	Cassini		M. tredecassini Alexander & Moore, 1962		United States
	M. septendecula Alexander & Moore, 1962		United States	Decula		M. tredecula Alexander & Moore, 1962		United States

=== Evolution and speciation ===
Not only are the periodical cicada life cycles curious for their use of the prime numbers 13 or 17, but their evolution is also intricately tied to one- and four-year changes in their life cycles. One-year changes are less common than four-year changes and are probably tied to variation in local climatic conditions. Four-year early and late emergences are common and involve a much larger proportion of the population than one-year changes. The different species are well-understood to have originated from a process of allochronic speciation, in which species subpopulations that are isolated from one another in time eventually become reproductively isolated as well.

Research suggests that in extant periodical cicadas, the 13- and 17-year life cycles evolved at least eight different times in the last 4 million years and that different species with identical life cycles developed their overlapping geographic distribution by synchronizing their life cycles to the existing dominant populations. The same study estimates that the Decim species group split from the common ancestor of the Decula plus Cassini species groups around 4 million years ago (Mya). At around 2.5 Mya, the Cassini and Decula groups split from each other.

The Sota et al. (2013) paper also calculates that the first separation of extant 13-year cicadas from 17-year cicadas took place in the Decim group about 530,000 years ago when the southern M. tredecim split from the northern M. septendecim. The second noteworthy event took place about 320,000 years ago with the split of the western Cassini group from its conspecifics to the east. The Decim and the Decula clades experienced similar western splits, but these are estimated to have taken place 270,000 and 230,000 years ago, respectively. The 13- and 17-year splits in Cassini and Decula took place after these events.

The 17-year cicadas largely occupy formerly glaciated territory, and as a result their phylogeographic relationships reflect the effects of repeated contraction into glacial refugia (small islands of suitable habitat) and subsequent re-expansion during multiple interglacial periods. In each species group, Decim, Cassini, and Decula, the signature of the glacial periods is manifested in three phylogeographic genetic subdivisions: one subgroup east of the Appalachians, one midwestern, and one on the far western edge of their range.

The Sota et al. data suggest that the founders of the southern 13-year cicada populations originated from the Decim group. These were later joined by Cassini originating from the western Cassini clade and Decula originating from eastern, middle, and western Decula clades. As Cassini and Decula invaded the south, they became synchronized with the resident M. tredecim. These Cassini and Decula are known as M. tredecassini and M. tredecula. More data is needed to lend support to this hypothesis and others hypotheses related to more recent 13- and 17-year splits involving M. neotredecim and M. tredecim.

== Distribution ==
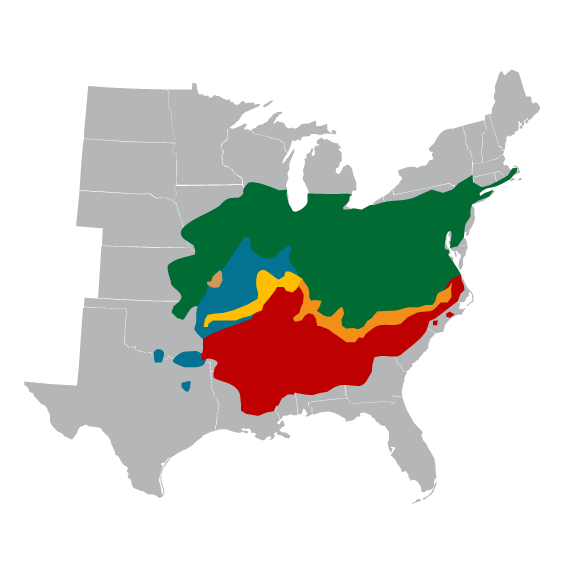
U.S. distribution of Magicicada: green = 17-year cicadas, red = 13-year cicadas, blue = M. neotredecim (13-year), yellow = overlap of M. neotredecim with M. tredecim (13-year), orange = reported but unconfirmed overlap of 13- and 17-year cicadas

The 17-year periodical cicadas are distributed from the Eastern states, across the Ohio Valley, to the Great Plains states and north to the edges of the Upper Midwest, while the 13-year cicadas occur in the Southern and Mississippi Valley states, with some slight overlap of the two groups. For example, broods IV (17-year cycle) and XIX (13-year cycle) overlap in western Missouri and eastern Oklahoma. Their emergences should again coincide in 2219, 2440, 2661, etc., as they did in 1998 (although distributions change slightly from generation to generation and older distribution maps can be unreliable).

An effort sponsored by the National Geographic Society is underway as of April 2021 at the University of Connecticut to generate new distribution maps of all periodical cicada broods. The effort uses crowdsourced data and records that entomologists and volunteers collect.

== Parasites, pests and pathogens ==
Although it usually feeds on oak leaf gall midge (Polystepha pilulae) larvae and other insects, the oak leaf gall mite ("itch mite") (Pyemotes herfsi) becomes an ectoparasite of periodical cicada eggs when these are available. After cicadas deposit their eggs in the branches of trees, feeding mites reproduce and their numbers increase.

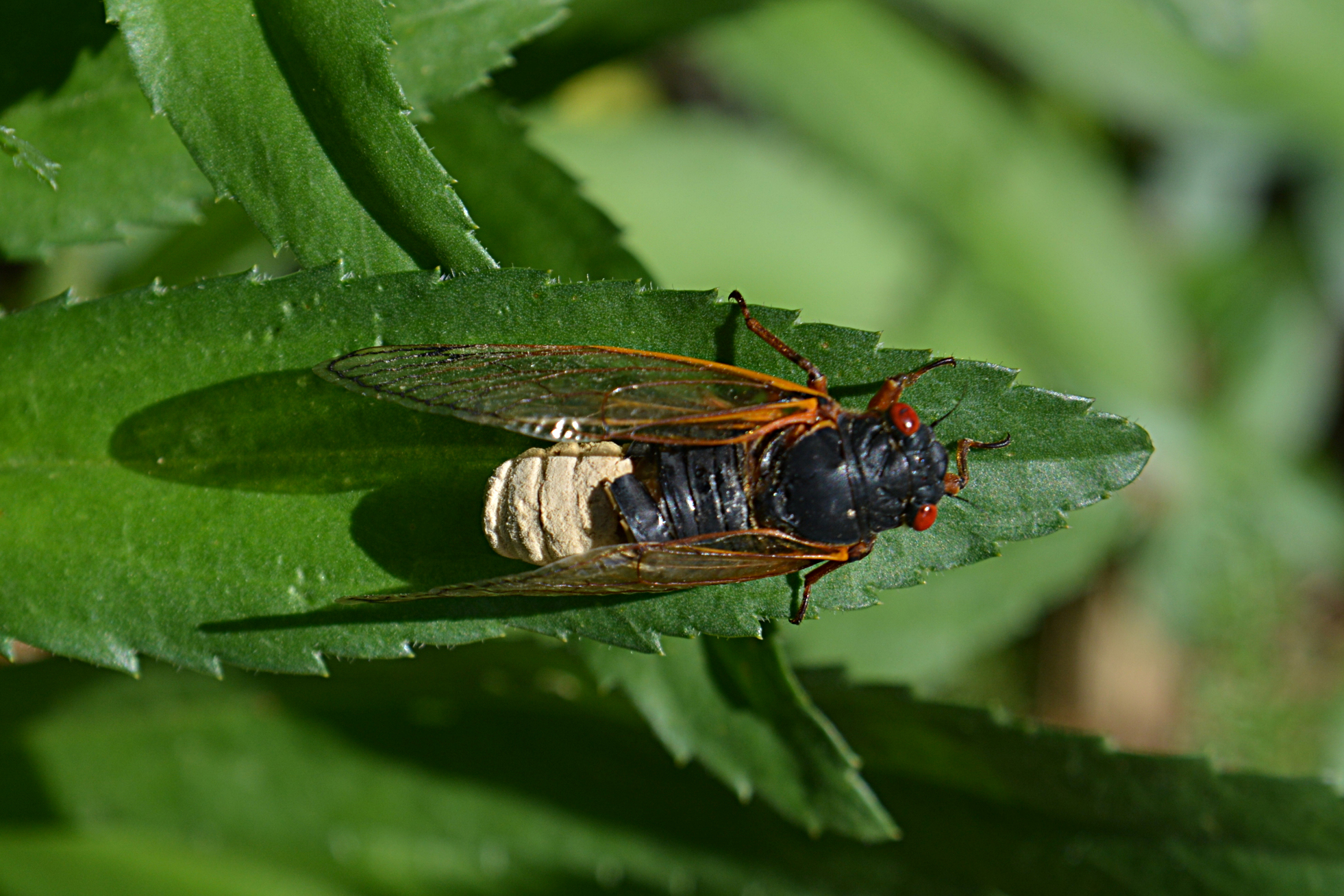
A Brood X Magicicada with abdominal Massospora cicadina infection in Bethesda, Maryland (May 31, 2021)

After cicada emergences have ended, many people have therefore developed rashes, pustules, intense itching and other mite bite sequelae on their upper torso, head, neck and arms. Rashes and itching peaked after several days, but lasted as long as two weeks. Anti-itch treatments, including calamine lotion and topical steroid creams, did not relieve the itching.

Massospora cicadina is a pathogenic fungus that infects only 13 and 17 year periodical cicadas. Infection results in a "plug" of spores that replaces the end of the cicada's abdomen while it is still alive, leading to infertility, disease transmission, and eventual death of the cicada.

== Symbiosis ==
Magicicada are unable to obtain all of the essential amino acids from the dilute xylem fluid that they feed upon, and instead rely upon endosymbiotic bacteria that provide essential vitamins and nutrients for growth. Bacteria in the genus Hodgkinia live inside periodical cicadas, and grow and divide for years before punctuated cicada reproduction events impose natural selection on these bacteria to maintain a mutually beneficial relationship. As a result, the genome of Hodgkinia has fractionated into three independent bacterial species each containing only a subset of genes essential for this symbiosis. The host requires all three subgroups of symbionts, as only the complete complement of all three subgroups provides the host with all its essential nutrients. The Hodgkinia–Magicicada symbiosis is a powerful example of how bacterial endosymbionts drive the evolution of their hosts.

== History ==
Marlatt wrote in his 1907 journal article that the earliest published account of the periodical cicada which had come under his observation appeared in a 1666 issue of the journal Philosophical Transactions of the Royal Society, which at the time had the name Philosophical Transactions. The account stated:

A great Observer, who hath lived long in New England, did upon occasion, relate to a Friend of his in London, where he lately was, That some few Years since there was such a swarm of a certain sort of Insects in that English Colony, that for the space of 200 Miles they poyson'd and destroyed all the Trees of that Country; there being found innumerable little holes in the ground, out of which those Insects broke forth in the form of Maggots, which turned into Flyes that had a kind of taile or sting, which they struck into the Tree, and thereby envenomed and killed it.

Marlatt also wrote that the next report of the cicada appeared in a work entitled New-Englands Memoriall, which was printed in Cambridge, Massachusetts in 1669. After describing a "pestilent fever" that had swept through the Plymouth Colony and neighboring Indians in 1633, the New-Englands Memoriall's account stated:

It is to be observed that, the spring before this sickness, there was a numerous company of Flies which were like for bigness unto Wasps or Bumble-Bees; they came out of little holes in the ground, and did eat up the green things, and made such a constant yelling noise as made the woods ring of them, and ready to deafen the hearers; they were not any seen or heard by the English in this country before this time; but the Indians told them that sickness would follow, and so it did, very hot, in the months of June, July, and August of that summer.

(Elaborating on an observation that Marlatt had reported in 1907, Gene Kritsky suggested in 2001 that the account of the 1633 emergence is misdated, as Broods XI and XIV would have emerged in Plymouth in 1631 and 1634, respectively, while no presently known brood would have emerged there in 1633. Kritsky also noted that William Bradford, the governor of the Plymouth Colony, had reportedly written in 1633 the same account of the cicada emergence that the New-Englands Memoriall published in 1669. However, a reprint of Bradford's History of Plymouth Plantation: 1606-1646 contains a different account of that emergence.)

Historical accounts cite reports of 15- to 17-year recurrences of enormous numbers of noisy emergent cicadas ("locusts") written as early as 1733. John Bartram, a noted Philadelphia botanist and horticulturist, was among the early writers that described the insect's life cycle, appearance and characteristics.

On May 9, 1715, Andreas Sandel, the pastor of Philadelphia's "Gloria Dei" Swedish Lutheran Church, described in his journal an emergence of Brood X. Pehr Kalm, a Finnish naturalist visiting Pennsylvania and New Jersey in 1749 on behalf of the Royal Swedish Academy of Sciences, observed in late May another emergence of that brood. When reporting the event in a paper that a Swedish academic journal published in 1756, Kalm wrote:

The general opinion is that these insects appear in these fantastic numbers in every seventeenth year. Meanwhile, except for an occasional one which may appear in the summer, they remain underground.
There is considerable evidence that these insects appear every seventeenth year in Pennsylvania.

Kalm then described Sandel's report and one that he had obtained from Benjamin Franklin that had recorded in Philadelphia the emergence from the ground of large numbers of cicadas during early May 1732. He noted that the people who had prepared these documents had made no such reports in other years.

Kalm further noted that others had informed him that they had seen cicadas only occasionally before the insects emerged from the ground in Pennsylvania in large swarms on May 22, 1749. He additionally stated that he had not heard any cicadas in Pennsylvania and New Jersey in 1750 in the same months and areas in which he had heard many in 1749. The 1715 and 1732 reports, when coupled with his own 1749 and 1750 observations, supported the previous "general opinion" that he had cited.

Kalm summarized his findings in a book translated into English and published in London in 1771, stating:

There are a kind of Locusts which about every seventeen years come hither in incredible numbers ... In the interval between the years when they are so numerous, they are only seen or heard single in the woods.

Based on Kalm's account and a specimen that Kalm had provided, in 1758 Carl Linnaeus named the insect Cicada septendecim in the tenth edition of his Systema Naturae.

Moses Bartram, a son of John Bartram, described the next appearance of the brood (Brood X) that Kalm had observed in 1749 in an article entitled Observations on the cicada, or locust of America, which appears periodically once in 16 or 17 years that he wrote in 1766. Bartram's article, which a London journal published in 1768, noted that upon hatching from eggs deposited in the twigs of trees, the young insects ran down to the earth and "entered the first opening that they could find". He reported that he had been able to discover them 10 feet (3 m) below the surface, but that others had reportedly found them 30 feet (9 m) deep.

In 1775, Thomas Jefferson recorded in his "Garden Book" Brood II's 17-year periodicity, writing that an acquaintance remembered "great locust years" in 1724 and 1741, that he and others recalled another such year in 1758 and that the insects had again emerged from the ground at Monticello in 1775. He noted that the females lay their eggs in the small twigs of trees while above ground.

The 1780 emergence of the Brood VII cicadas (also known as the Onondaga brood) during the American Revolutionary War, coincided with the aftermath of the military operation known as the Sullivan Expedition which devastated the indigenous Onondagan communities and destroyed their crops. The sudden arrival of such a substantial quantity of the cicadas provided a source of sustenance for the Onondaga people who were experiencing severe food insecurity following the Sullivan campaigns and the subsequent brutal winter. The seemingly miraculous arrival of the cicadas is commemorated by the Onondaga as an intervention by the Creator to ensure their survival after such a traumatizing, catastrophic event.

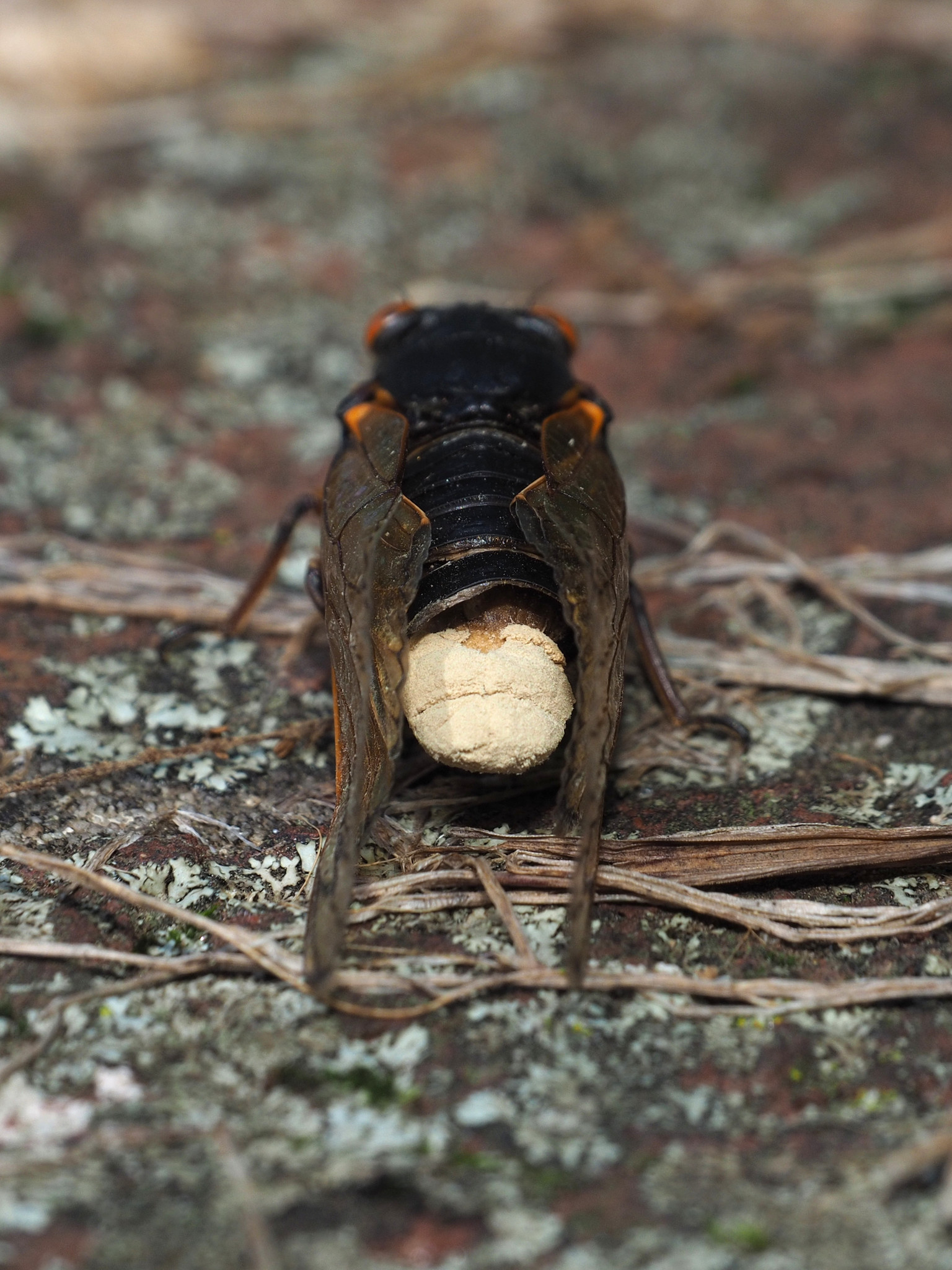
A Brood X Magicicada with abdominal Massospora cicadina infection in Takoma Park, Maryland (May 31, 2021)

In April 1800, Benjamin Banneker, who lived near Ellicott's Mills, Maryland, wrote in his record book that he recalled a "great locust year" in 1749, a second in 1766 during which the insects appeared to be "full as numerous as the first", and a third in 1783. He predicted that the insects (Brood X) "may be expected again in they year 1800 which is Seventeen Since their third appearance to me". Describing an effect that the pathogenic fungus, Massospora cicadina, has on its host, Banneker's record book stated that the insects:

... begin to Sing or make a noise from first they come out of the Earth till they die. The hindermost part rots off, and it does not appear to be any pain to them, for they still continue on Singing till they die.

In 1845, Dr. D.L. Pharas of Woodville, Mississippi, announced the 13-year periodicity of the southern cicada broods in a local newspaper, the Woodville Republican. In 1858, Pharas placed the title Cicada tredecim in a subsequent article that the newspaper published on the subject 13 years later.

Ten years afterwards, Benjamin Dann Walsh and Charles Valentine Riley authored a paper that the American Entomologist published in December 1868 which also reported the 13-year periodicity of the southern cicada broods. Walsh and Riley "for convenience sake", named the 13-year brood Cicada tredecim, in contradistinction to Cicada septemdecim, the 17-year brood.

Walsh's and Riley's paper, which Scientific American reprinted with some revisions in January 1869, illustrated the interior and exterior characteristics of the nymphs' emergence holes and raised turrets. Their articles, which did not cite Pharas' reports, were the first to describe the southern cicadas' 13-year periodicity that received widespread attention. Riley later acknowledged Pharas' work in an 1885 publication on periodical cicadas that he authored.

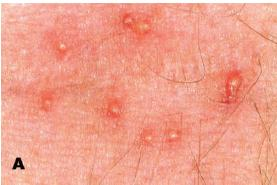
Itch mite bites

In 1998, an emergence contained a brood of 17-year cicadas (Brood IV) in western Missouri and a brood of 13-year cicadas (Brood XIX) over much of the rest of the state. Each of the broods are the state's largest of their types. As the territories of the two broods overlap (converge) in some areas, the convergence was the state's first since 1777.

In 2007 and 2008, Edmond Zaborski, a research scientist with the Illinois Natural History Survey, reported that the oak leaf gall mite ("itch mite") (Pyemotes herfsi) is an ectoparasite of periodical cicada eggs. While investigating with the help of others the mysterious itchy welts and rashes that people were developing in Chicago's suburbs after the end of a 2007 Brood XIII emergence, he attributed the event to bites by mites whose populations had quickly increased while parasitizing those eggs. Similar events occurred in Cincinnati after a Brood XIV emergence ended in 2008, in Cleveland and elsewhere in northern and eastern Ohio after a Brood V emergence ended in 2016, in the Washington, D.C., area after a Brood X emergence ended in 2021, and again in the Chicago area after the next Brood XIII emergence ended in 2024.

== Use as human food ==
Magicicada species are edible when cooked for people who lack allergies to similar foods. A number of recipes are available for this purpose. Some recommend collecting the insects shortly after molting while still soft. Others exhibit preferences for emergent nymphs or hardened adults.

The insects have historically been eaten by Native Americans, who fried them or roasted them in hot ovens, stirring them until they were well browned. Marlatt wrote in 1907:

The use of the newly emerged and succulent cicadas as an article of human diet has merely a theoretical interest, because, if for no other reason, they occur too rarely to have any real value. There is also the much stronger objection in the instinctive repugnance which all insects seem to inspire as an article of food to most civilized nations. Theoretically, the Cicada, collected at the proper time and suitably dressed and served, should be a rather attractive food. The larvae have lived solely on vegetable matter of the cleanest and most whole-some sort, and supposedly, therefore, would be much more palatable and suitable for food than the oyster, with its scavenger habit of living in the muddy ooze of river bottoms, or many other animals which are highly prized and which have not half so clean a record as the periodical Cicada.
