= Brood XXII =

Periodical cicada brood

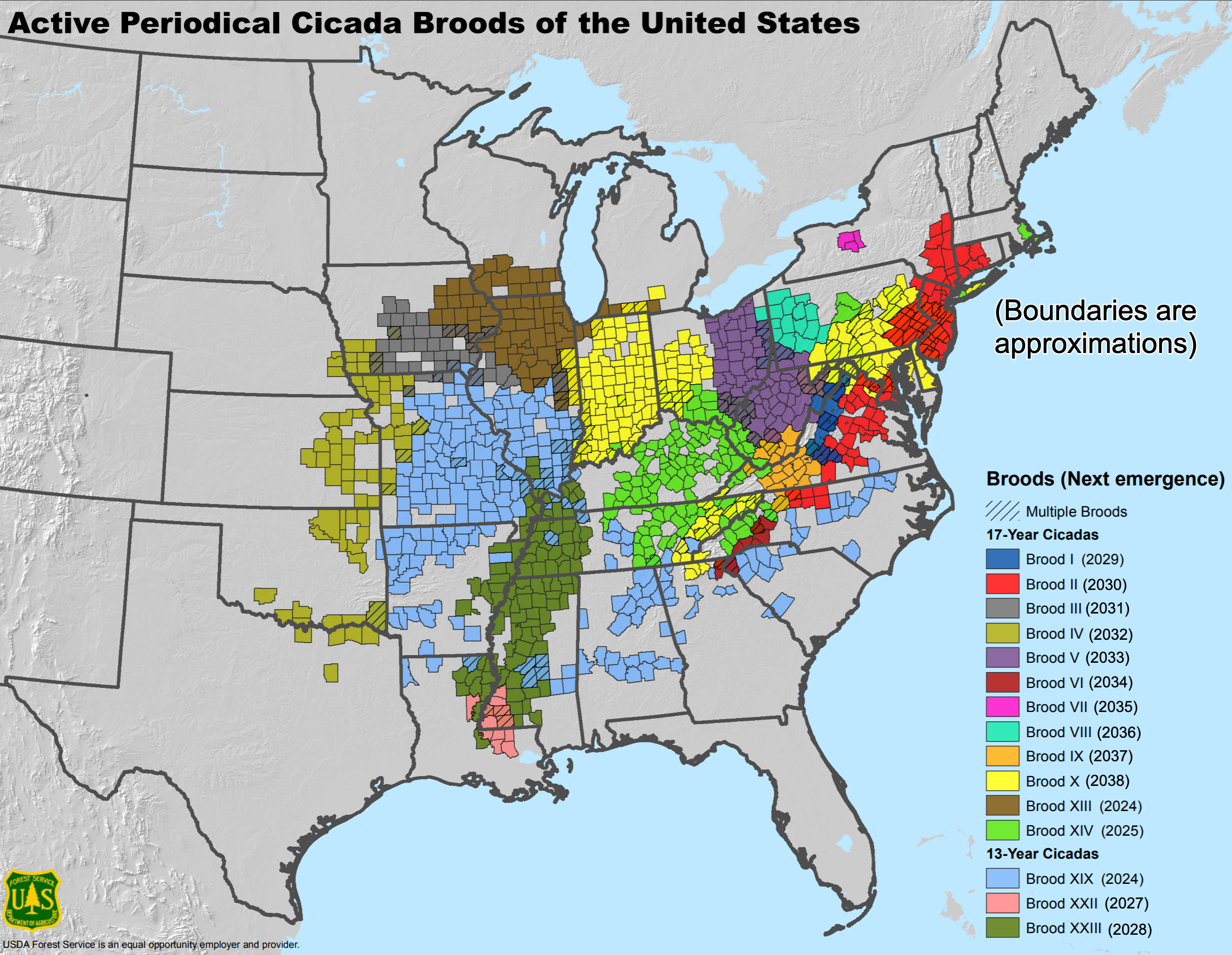
Map of periodic cicada broods with Brood XXII shown in pink.

Brood XXII (also known as The Baton Rouge Brood) is a brood of 13-year periodical cicadas, last seen in 2014 in a geographic region centered on Baton Rouge, Louisiana, as well as other locations in southeast Louisiana and southwest Mississippi. Periodical cicadas (Magicicada spp.) are often referred to as "17-year locusts" because most of the known distinct broods have a 17-year life cycle. Brood XXII is one of only three surviving broods with a 13-year cycle. The next emergence of The Baton Rouge Brood is expected in 2027.

== Position among other broods of cicadas ==
Every 13 years, Brood XXII tunnels en masse to the surface of the ground, mates, lays eggs, and then dies off in several weeks.

In 1907, the entomologist C. L. Marlatt postulated the existence of 30 different broods of periodical cicadas: 17 distinct broods with a 17-year life cycle, to which he assigned Roman numerals I through XVII (with emerging years 1893 through 1909); plus 13 broods with a 13-year cycle, to which he assigned Roman numerals XVIII through XXX (1893 through 1905). Many of these hypothetical broods, however, have not been observed. Today, only 15 are recognized.

Brood XXII is one of three extant broods of 13-year cicadas. The other two are Broods XIX and XXIII, expected to re-emerge in 2037 and 2028 respectively. A fourth 13-year brood, Brood XXI (The Floridian Brood) was last recorded in 1870 in the Florida panhandle, but is believed to be now extinct.

== Species present ==
Brood XXII includes three of the four different species of 13-year cicadas: Magicicada tredecim (Walsh and Riley, 1868), Magicicada tredecassini (Alexander and Moore, 1962), and Magicicada tredecula (Alexander and Moore, 1962).
