= Brood XIV =

Periodical cicada brood

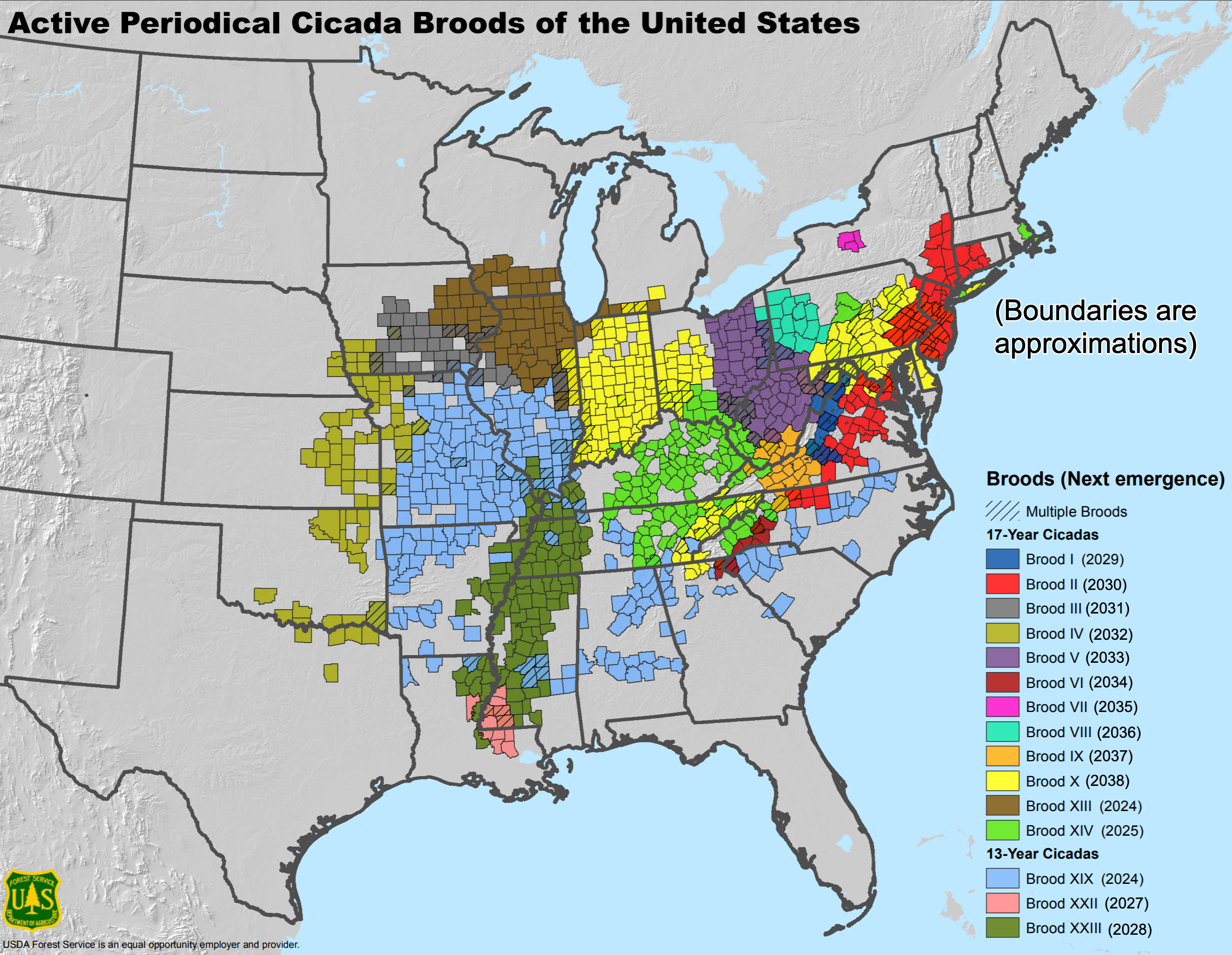
Map of periodic cicada broods with Brood XIV shown in bright green.

Brood XIV (also known as Brood 14) is one of 15 separate broods of periodical cicadas that appear regularly throughout parts of the midwestern, northeastern, and southeastern United States. Every 17 years, the cicadas of Brood XIV tunnel en masse to the surface of the ground, mate, lay eggs, and then die off in several weeks.

Although entomologist C. L. Marlatt published an account in 1907 in which he argued for the existence of 30 broods, over the years a number have been consolidated and only 15 are recognized today as being distinct. Brood XIV is among the 12 different broods with 17-year cycles.

The adult insects are black, 4 cm (1.6 in) long, and do not sting or bite. Once they emerge, they spend their short two-week lives climbing trees, shedding their crunchy skins and reproducing. They can number up to a million per 2.4 acres.

== Emergences ==
The 1634 emergence of Brood XIV was described by William Bradford in Of Plymouth Plantation:

... and the spring before, especially all the month of May, there was such a quantity, of a great sort of flies, like (for bigness) to wasps, or bumblebees, which came out of holes in the ground, and replenished all the woods, and eat the green things; and made such a constant yelling noise, as made all the woods ring of them, and ready to deaf the hearers; they have not by the English been heard, or seen before or since.

The brood's last emergence was in the spring and early summer of 2025, and it will emerge again in 2042.

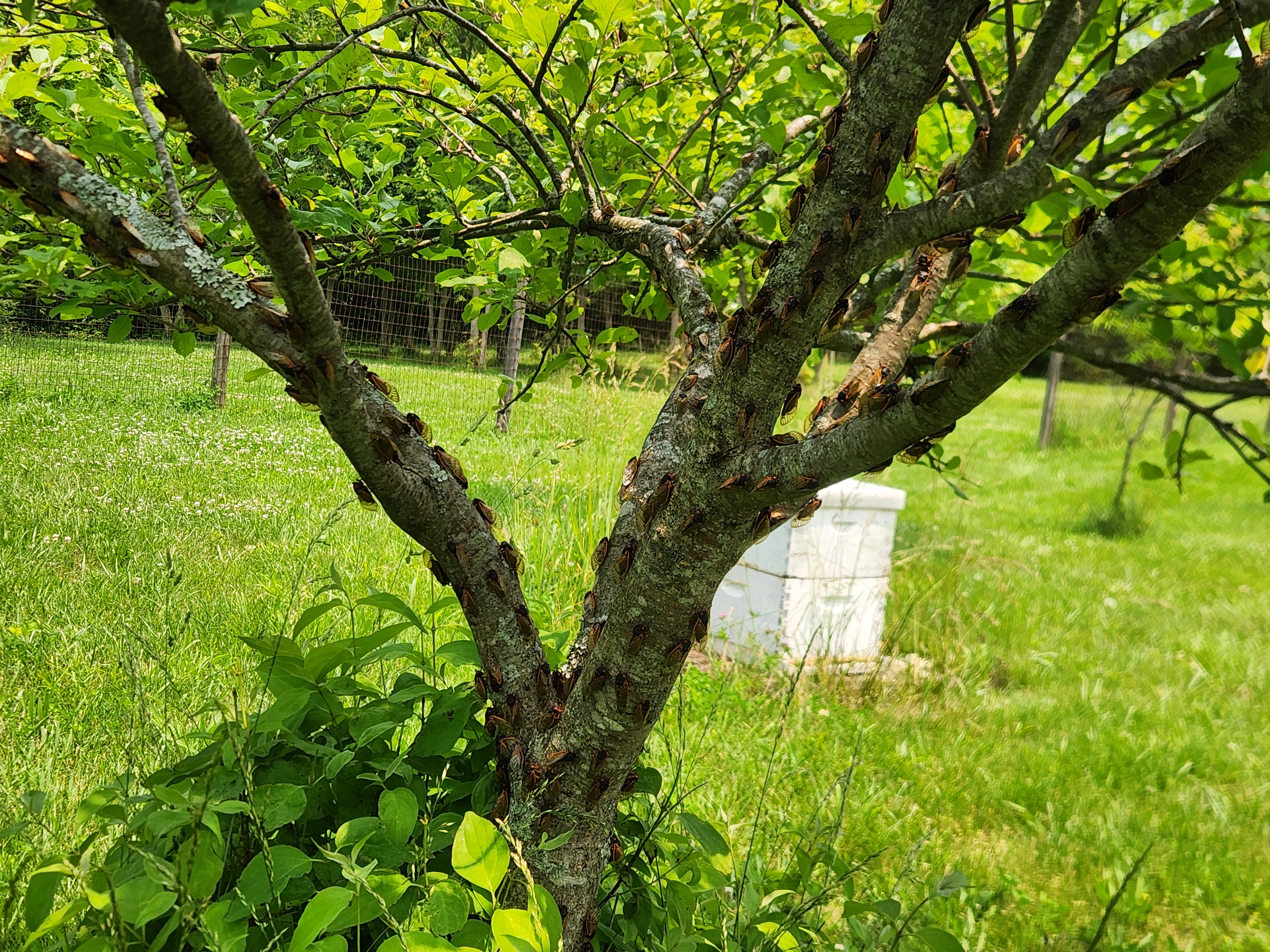
Periodical cicadas Brood XIV, June 2025
