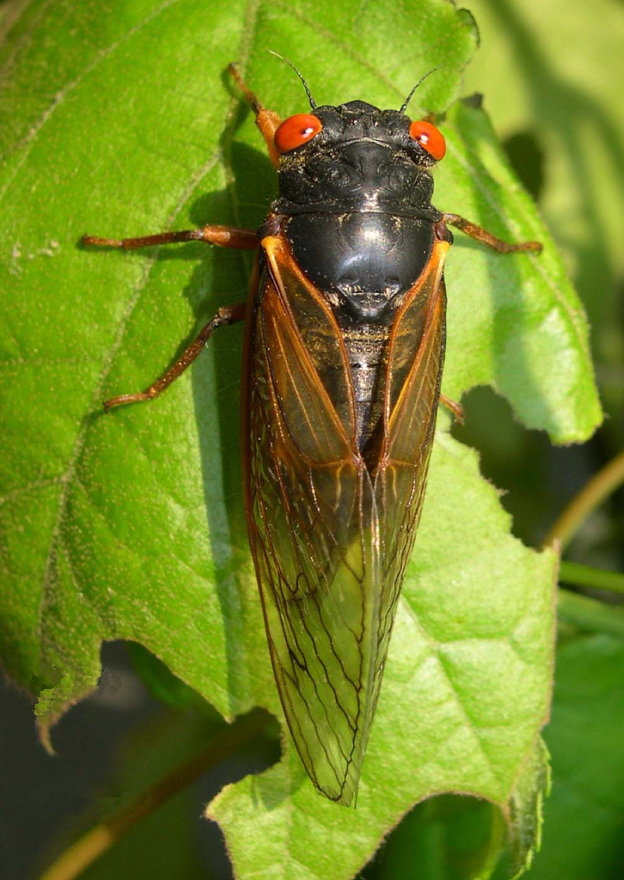

Conservation status
- Near Threatened (IUCN 2.3)

Scientific classification
- Kingdom: Animalia
- Phylum: Arthropoda
- Clade: Pancrustacea
- Class: Insecta
- Order: Hemiptera
- Suborder: Auchenorrhyncha
- Family: Cicadidae
- Genus: Magicicada
- Species: M. septendecula

Binomial name
- Magicicada septendecula Alexander & Moore, 1962

= Magicicada septendecula =

Species of true bug

Magicicada septendecula is a species of insect in family Cicadidae. It is endemic to the United States.

== Lifespan ==
Their median lifespan from egg to natural adult death is around seventeen years. However, their lifespan can range between thirteen and twenty-one years.
