= Decim periodical cicadas =

Group of insect species

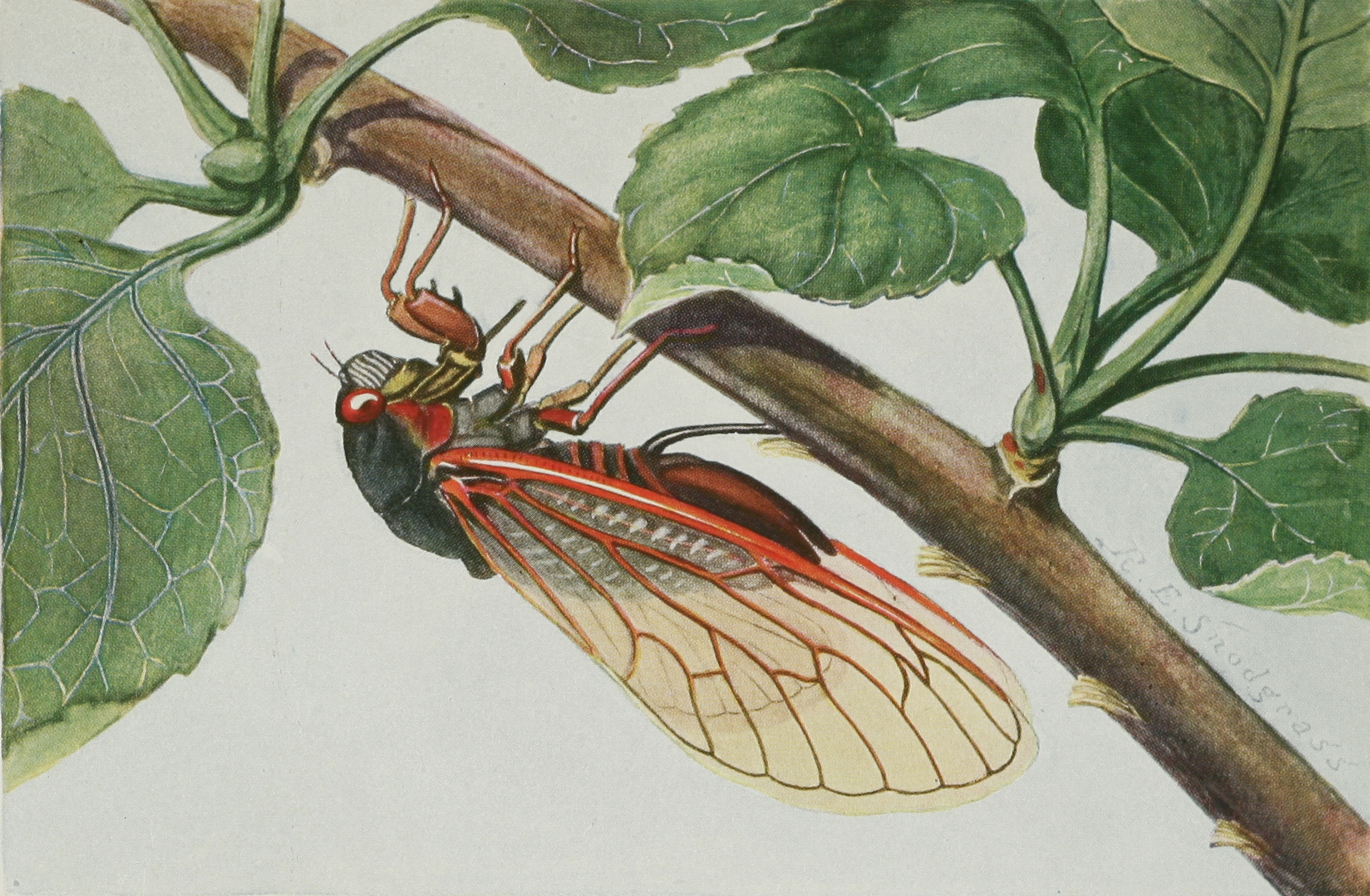
Magicicada septendecim (Linnaeus, 1758) was the first periodical cicada described. This 17-year species is closely related to two 13-year species (M. tredecim and M. neotredecim); these three species are often described together as "decim periodical cicadas."

Decim periodical cicadas is a term used to group three closely related species of periodical cicadas: Magicicada septendecim, Magicicada tredecim, and Magicicada neotredecim. M. septendecim, first described by Carl Linnaeus, has a 17-year life cycle; the name septendecim is Latin for 17. M. tredecim, first described in 1868, has a similar call and appearance but a 13-year life cycle; tredecim is Latin for 13. M. neotredecim (Latin for "new 13"), first described in 2000 by Marshall and Cooley in an article in the journal Evolution, is a 13-year species but otherwise much more similar to M. septendecim than to M. tredecim as shown by studies of DNA and abdominal color variation by Chris Simon and colleagues in a companion article in the same journal issue.

== Description ==
Like other species included in Magicicada, decim periodical cicadas have synchronized development with a long larval period underground (13 or 17 years, depending on species), followed by mass emergence, quick development to adult flying forms, and massed singing choruses of males that attract many females. Mating, egg-laying, and the death of all adult cicadas occur within weeks. Eggs hatch into first-instar larvae, which tunnel into the earth to begin their own multi-year subterranean feeding period.

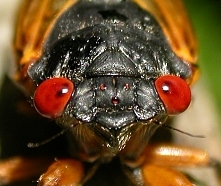
Head of Magicicada septendecim showing red eyes and three ocelli

All Magicicada species have a black dorsal thorax and orange wing veins. Their large compound eyes, and the three ocelli arranged in a triangle between two eyes, are red. All three decim species show orange coloration on the underside of the abdomen: broad orange stripes in the case of M. septendecim and M. neotredecim, solid orangish or caramel color in the case of M. tredecim.

Magicicada males typically form large aggregations that sing in chorus to attract receptive females. The decim periodical cicadas share a distinctive song said to resemble someone calling "weeeee-whoa" or "Pharaoh". The Encyclopedia of Entomology describes a decim song pattern as "pure tone, musical buzz ending in a drop in pitch".

The calling song of M. tredecim has a slightly lower pitch than those of M. septendecim and M. neotredecim. M. neotredecim was first identified when scientists noticed a bimodal split in the dominant pitch (frequency) of male calling songs during the 1998 emergence of Brood XIX.

The dominant song pitch of M. neotredecim ranges from 1.25 to 1.90 kHz. (This is similar to the pitch-range of M. septendecim, except that songs of the 17-year species do not extend so far into high frequencies.) M. neotredecim song frequencies have been observed to displace upward in areas where their range overlaps with the similar M. tredecim, whose dominant song pitch is lower, ranging between 1.00 and 1.25 kHz.

These distinctive calling songs prompted a closer look at older data concerning M. tredecim. Two forms of mitochondrial DNA, correlated with a difference in abdominal color, had already been seen in insects assigned to this species. David Marshall and John Cooley determined that these known differences correlated with the observed pitch difference in males and a corresponding pitch preference in females. The name M. neotredecim was given to the variant whose song, abdominal coloring (orange with a black lateral band or center), and mitochondrial DNA resemble the 17-year species M. septendecim. The earlier name M. tredecim was reserved for the group whose abdomen is mostly orange, whose song has a lower pitch, and whose mitochondrial DNA differs slightly from the two other species of decim cicadas. The mitochondrial DNA difference observed suggests that the M. tredecim lineage separated from the other decim line about one million years ago.

== Habitat ==
The decim cicadas live in the United States east of the Great Plains. They are typically found in upland woods and forest-prairie ecotones, favoring deciduous trees and shrubs both for chorus locations and for laying their eggs. Nymphs can survive feeding on the roots of many kinds of plants, including conifers and deciduous trees.
