= Magicicada tredecula =

Scientific classification
- Kingdom: Animalia
- Phylum: Arthropoda
- Clade: Pancrustacea
- Class: Insecta
- Order: Hemiptera
- Suborder: Auchenorrhyncha
- Family: Cicadidae
- Genus: Magicicada
- Species: M. tredecula

Binomial name
- Magicicada tredecula Alexander & Moore, 1962

Species of true bug

Magicicada tredecula is a species of periodical cicada in the family Cicadidae. It is endemic to the United States. As its specific epithet implies, they emerge as adults once every thirteen years.

== Life Cycle ==
Their median life cycle from egg to natural adult death is around thirteen years. However, their life cycle can range from nine years to seventeen years.
