= Michael Raupp =

Michael "The Bug Guy" Raupp is an American entomologist, Professor Emeritus, and Extension Specialist at the University of Maryland, College Park (UMD). He is most known for his "Bug of the Week" blog and YouTube channel as well as television and media appearances.

== Life and Career ==
Dr. Raupp’s interest in entomology began when he started studying medical entomology. He switched from pre-vet to entomology, receiving his B. S. in animal science in 1975 and M. S. in entomology in 1977 from Rutgers University. He later earned his PhD in entomology from UMD in 1982. He has remained at UMD since, being involved with UMD Biological Sciences Graduate Program, Behavior, Ecology, Evolution, & Systematics. In 2004, Raupp served as Department Chair of Entomology, Associate Dean and Extension Director at UMD, and as President of the Entomological Society of America's Eastern Branch in 2004. His extension programs focused on the theory and practice of integrated pest management in the green industry. He's also written two books, 26 Things that Bug Me, a children's book, and Managing Insect and Mites on Woody Landscape Plants.

Raupp is married to colleague and fellow entomologist at the University of Maryland, Dr. Paula Shrewsbury. They have done many of their media appearances together, and occasionally write joint articles for Tree Care Industry Magazine.

== In the Media ==
In 2005, Raupp started his “Bug of the Week” blog on UMD’s website. There, he gives fun facts about many different bugs that interest him, earning him the nickname "The Bug Guy". The site gained immense popularity in the first few months, and in 2013, the blog was moved to a self-hosted site where Raupp still posts his weekly bug facts. He's taken his science communication to the next level through many media appearances. Because of Raupp's popularity as "The Bug Guy", he is often consulted by the media on bug related issues, most notably cicadas. Throughout his career, he's appeared on many big name shows including The Tonight Show with Jay Leno, The Dr. Oz show, and Tyra Banks. He most often appears on NPR and local news stations in the Washington DC metro area.

=== Cicadas ===
Raupp's populairty as "The Bug Guy" startd because of the Brood X emergence in 2004. Then, he was tasked with providing information about them to the public, and he has continued doing so ever since. One of his first aapearances was on PBS News in 2004. He gave an interview explaining how cicadas know when to emerge. Seventeen years later, in 2021, Brood X emerged once again, and once more, Raupp was there to explain them to the public just as he had done 17 years earlier. He did the same in 2024, during the historic simultaneous emergence of both Brood XIX and Brood XIII. Though Maryland was not the epicenter of the emergence, Raupp and Shrewsbury were able to offer the public information on what to expect.

=== Spotted Lantern Flies ===
In addition to cicadas, Raupp has been appearing on local news stations in the DMV to warn residents about the invasive spotted lantern flies. He advises residents to get rid of their heaven tree as that is a source of food for the lanternfly. This is especially true of female insects which make up the majority of the lanterfly swarm in the Mid-Atlantic.

=== Other Appearances ===
Raupp has also appeared in the media to discuss a multitude of other topics including murder hornets, many types of flies and mosquitoes, and even the ants in Marvel's Ant-Man (2015).

== Research ==
=== Selected Works ===
- Kim, Suji, Anna Kuhn, Michael J. Raupp, and Holly Martinson. (2023). Host preferences of spotted lanternfly and risk assessment of potential tree hosts in managed and semi-natural landscapes. Florida Entomologist, 106(2): 74-82

- Brumfield, K. D., Raupp, M. J., Haji, D., Simon, C., Graf, J., Cooley, J. R., Janton, S. T., Meister, R. C., Huq, A., Colwell, R. R., & Hasan, N. A. (2022). Gut microbiome insights from 16S rRNA analysis of 17-year periodical cicadas (hemiptera: Magicicada spp.) broods II, VI, and X. Scientific Reports, 12(1), Article 16967. https://doi.org/10.1038/s41598-022-20527-7

- Cullum, John P., Laura J. Nixon, William R. Morrison, Michael J. Raupp, Paula M. Shrewsbury, P. Dilip Venugopal, Holly Martinson, J. Christopher Bergh, and Tracy C. Leskey. (2020). Influence of Landscape Factors and Abiotic Conditions on Dispersal Behavior and Overwintering Site Selection by Halyomorpha halys (Hemiptera: Pentatomidae). Journal of Economic Entomology. 113(4) DOI: 10.1093/jee/toaa077

- Sargent, C., Raupp, M., Bean, D., & Sawyer, A. (2010). Dispersal of emerald ash borer within an intensively managed quarantine zone. Arboriculture & Urban Forestry, 36(4), 160–163. https://doi.org/10.48044/jauf.2010.021

- Raupp, M. J., Shrewsbury, P. M., & Herms, D. A. (2010). Ecology of herbivorous arthropods in urban landscapes. Annual Review of Entomology, 55, 19–38. PubMed. https://doi.org/10.1146/annurev-ento-112408-085351

== Awards and Honors ==
- 2016: Entomological Society of America Eastern Branch L.O. Howard Distinguished Achievement Award
- 2015: Elected Entomological Society of America Fellow
- 2015: Maryland Board of Regents' Award for Excellence in Public Service
- 2012: International Society of Arboriculture R.W. Harris Author’s Citation Award
- 2009: Entomological Society of America Distinguished Achievement Award in Extension
- 1996: Secretary of Agriculture’s Award for Environmental Protection
