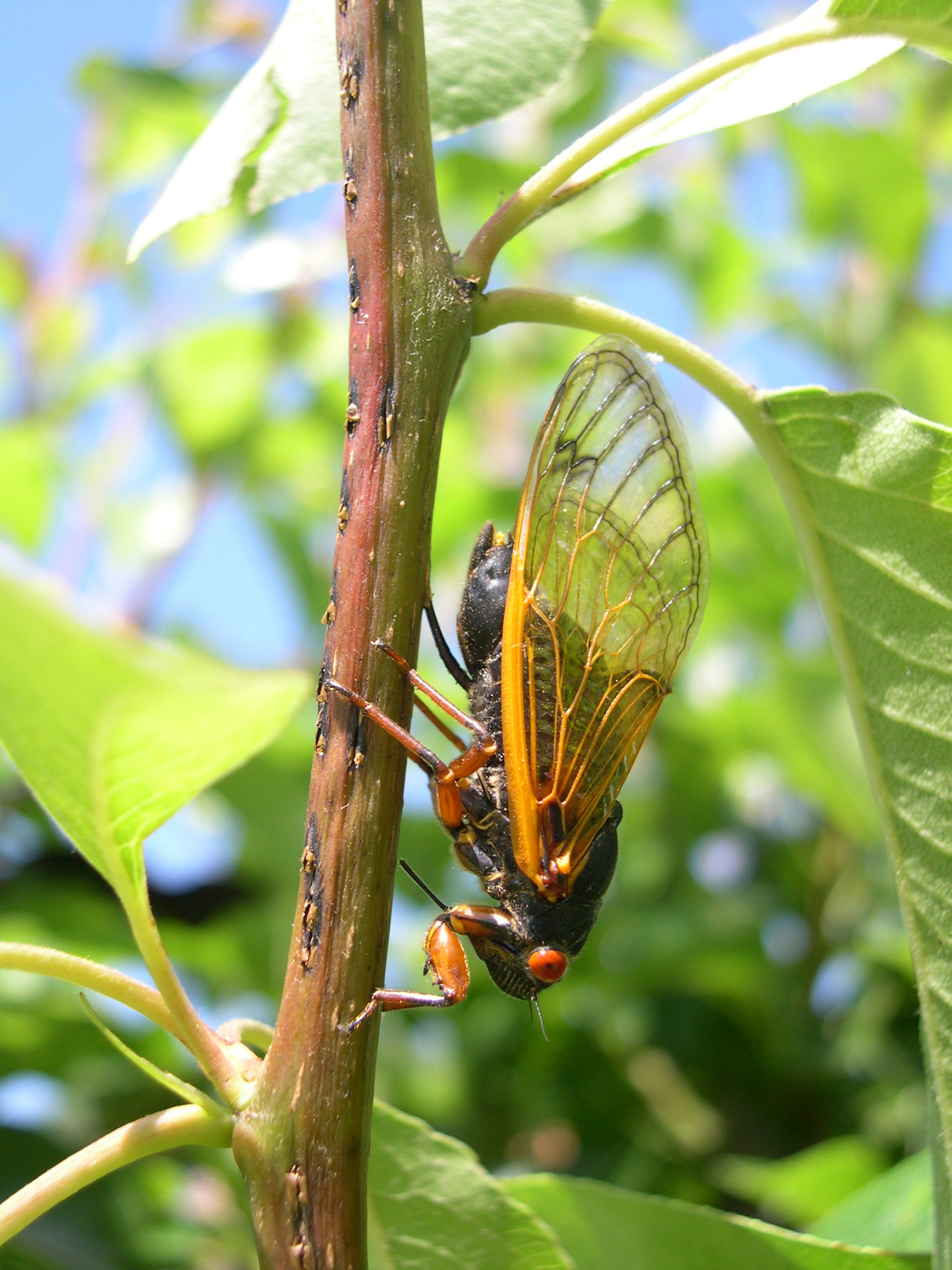
- Female ovipositing

Conservation status
- Near Threatened (IUCN 2.3)

Scientific classification
- Kingdom: Animalia
- Phylum: Arthropoda
- Clade: Pancrustacea
- Class: Insecta
- Order: Hemiptera
- Suborder: Auchenorrhyncha
- Family: Cicadidae
- Genus: Magicicada
- Species: M. cassini

Binomial name
- Magicicada cassini (Fisher, 1852)

Synonyms
- Cicada cassinii Fisher, 1852

= Magicicada cassini =

17-year periodic cicada

Magicicada cassini (originally spelled cassinii (Note: The original spelling for Fisher's 17-year periodical cicada species is cassinii, with two terminal 'i's, but a large majority of publications have spelled the name cassini since the mid-1960s. Although cassini is an incorrect subsequent spelling under Article 33.4 of the rules of nomenclature, Article 33.3.1 states that "when an incorrect subsequent spelling is in prevailing usage and is attributed to the publication of the original spelling, the subsequent spelling and attribution are to be preserved and the spelling is deemed to be a correct original spelling". The correct spelling for the 13-year relative is tredecassini.)), known as the 17-year cicada, Cassin's periodical cicada or the dwarf periodical cicada, is a species of periodical cicada. It is endemic to North America. It has a 17-year life cycle but is otherwise indistinguishable from the 13-year periodical cicada Magicicada tredecassini. The two species are usually discussed together as "cassini periodical cicadas" or "cassini-type periodical cicadas." Unlike other periodical cicadas, cassini-type males may synchronize their courting behavior so that tens of thousands of males sing and fly in unison. The species was first reported to the Academy of Natural Sciences of Philadelphia by Margaretta Morris in 1846. In 1852, the species was formally described by J. C. Fisher and given the specific name cassini in honour of John Cassin, an American ornithologist, whose own report was included by Fisher in his publication.

== Description ==
The adult M. cassini is very similar in appearance to other periodical cicadas. It is between 24 and 27 mm (0.94 and 1.06 in) long, measured from the front of the head to the tip of the wings folded over the abdomen. The head is black, the eyes are large and red, the pronotum is black apart from a narrow orange band at the edge of the sternites, and the abdomen is black. The legs are orange and the wings are translucent, with orange veins and dusky markings near the tips.

== Distribution and habitat ==
Magicicada cassini is endemic to North America, its range extending across the northern belt of the United States and the southern part of Canada.

== Life cycle ==
Mating call Brood XIII sub-brood, 2020

These cicadas are true bugs and after having emerged from underground, the adults feed on sap sucked from trees and shrubs. Males amass in great numbers and sing in unison to attract females. The call lasts for two to four seconds and is a series of ticks followed by a drawn-out buzz which rises and falls in pitch. At the end of a chorus, males move to a new perch before starting the song again. After mating, the females insert their ovipositors into shoots and lay their eggs. These hatch about two months later and the first instar nymphs drop to the ground where they move underground and suck xylem sap from small rootlets. This sap is very low in nutritive value and the nymphs grow very slowly. They will moult five times, moving on to larger roots deep in the soil as they grow over a period of seventeen years. Finally, they all tunnel up through the soil and emerge into the open air, before climbing up the vegetation and shedding their skins for a final time to become adults. Although each population has a seventeen-year life cycle and emerges in synchrony, past environmental events have occasionally disrupted this pattern and there are several different broods in existence in various parts of the insect's range which emerge in different calendar years. In fact, their life cycle can range from thirteen to twenty-one years.

The different broods have been numbered, and the most recent emergence of Brood X occurred in Delaware, Georgia, Illinois, Indiana, Kentucky, Maryland, Michigan, North Carolina, New Jersey, New York, Ohio, Pennsylvania, Tennessee, Virginia, Washington, D.C., and West Virginia in May and June 2021. Many broods have a sub-brood that emerge a few years before the regular brood. The Brood XIII sub-brood in the Chicago area emerged 4 years early in 2020.

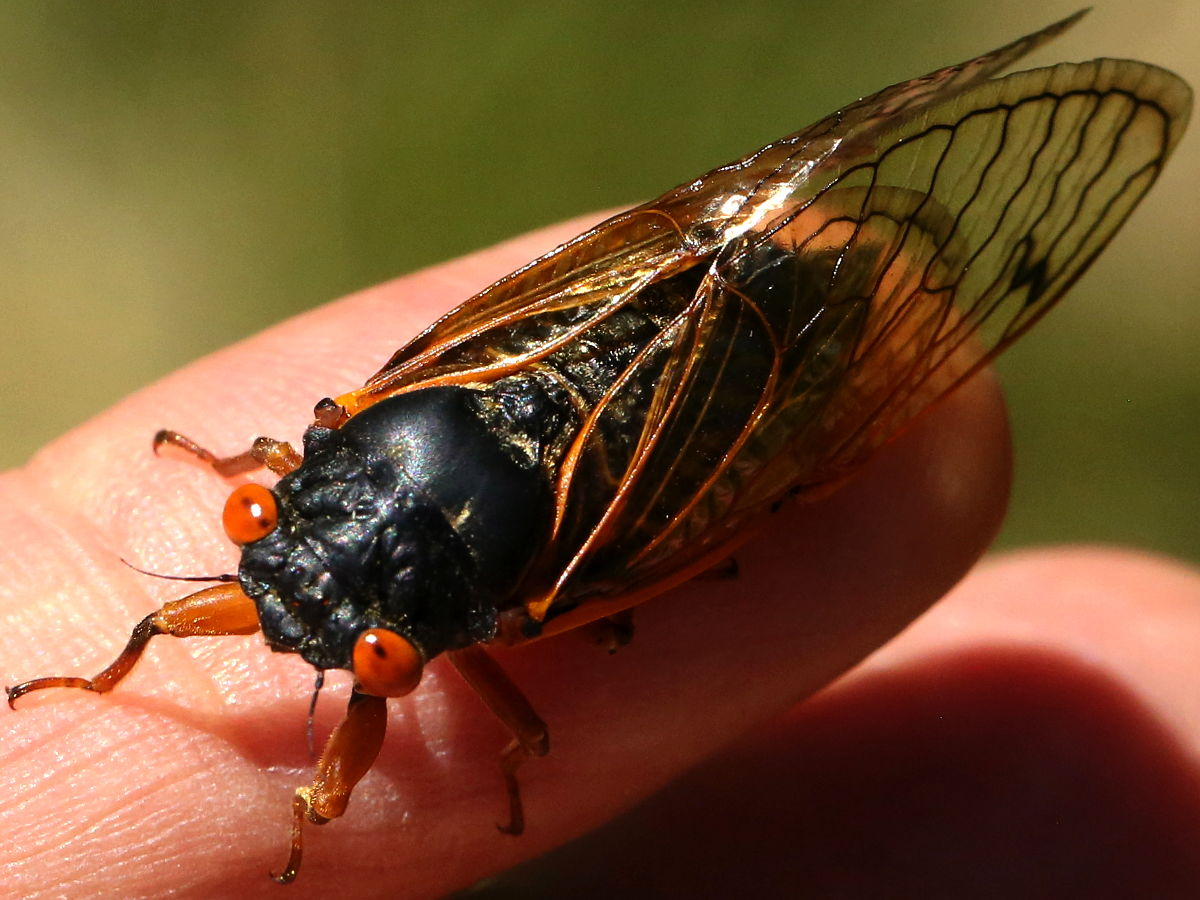
Male dorsal Brood XIII sub-brood, 2020

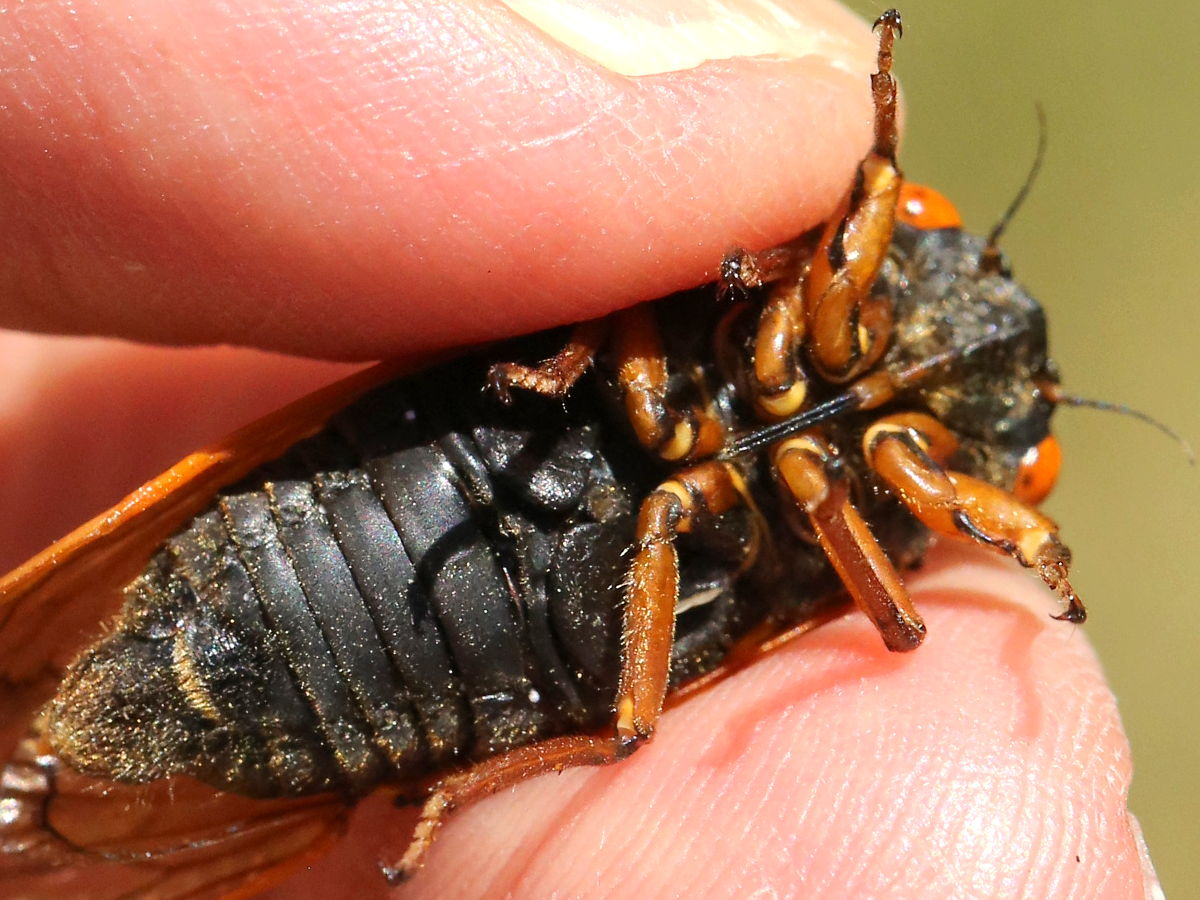
Male ventral Brood XIII sub-brood, 2020

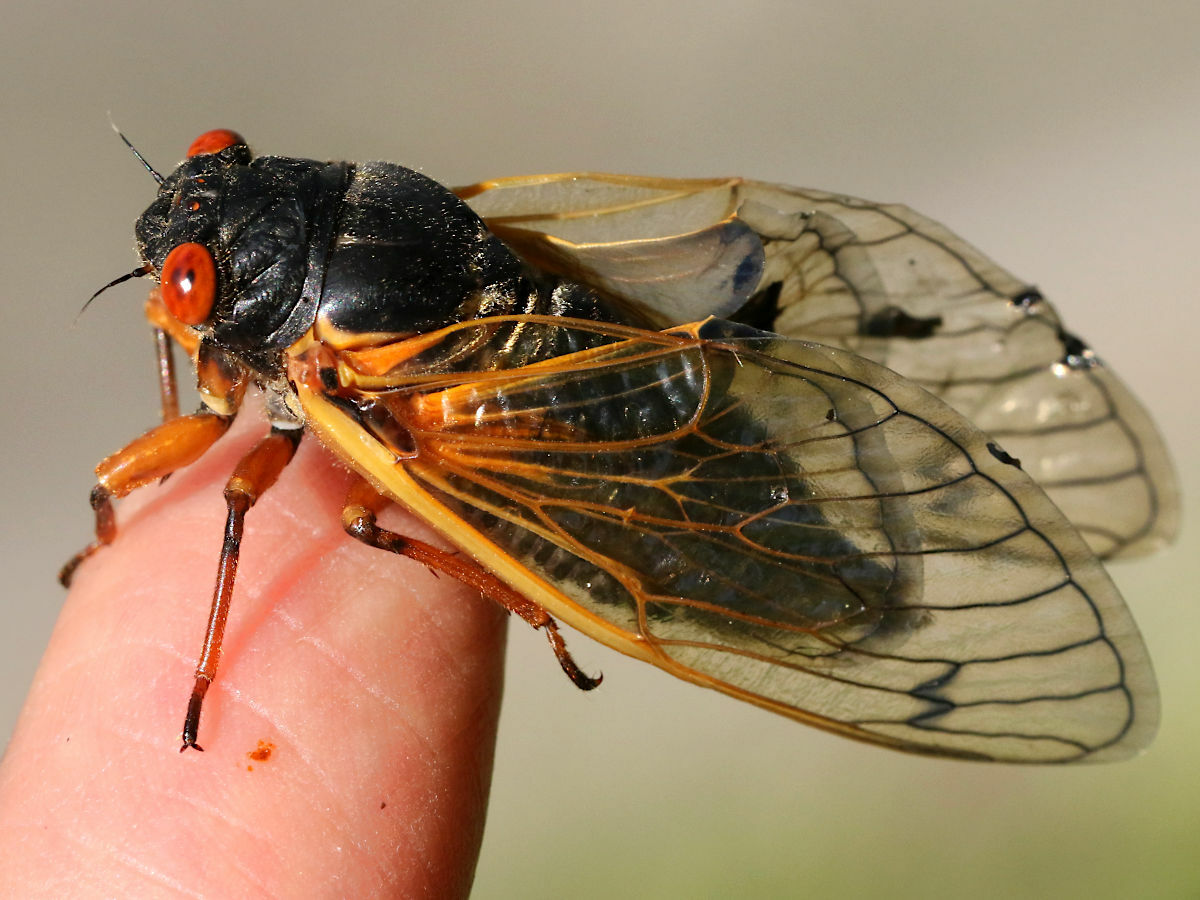
Female dorsal Brood XIII, 2024

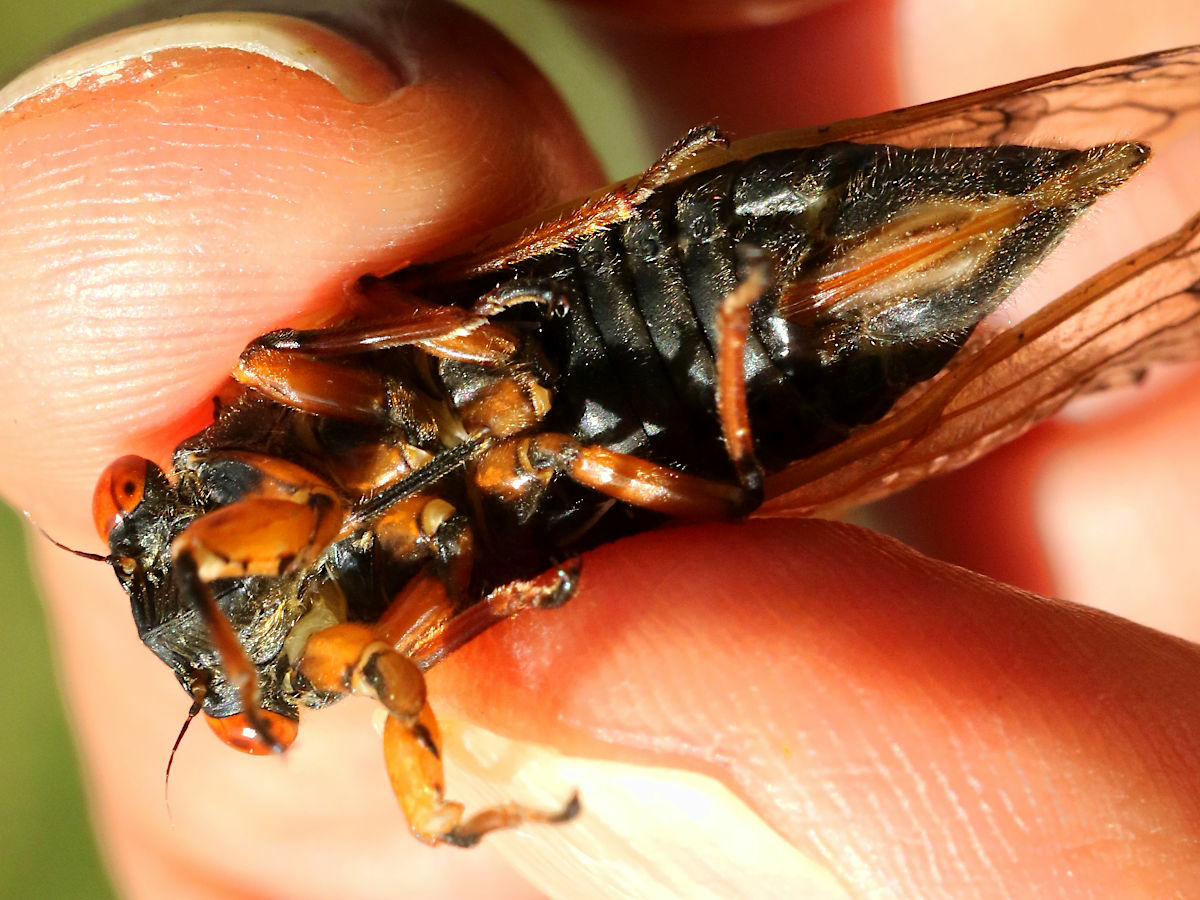
Female ventral Brood XIII, 2024

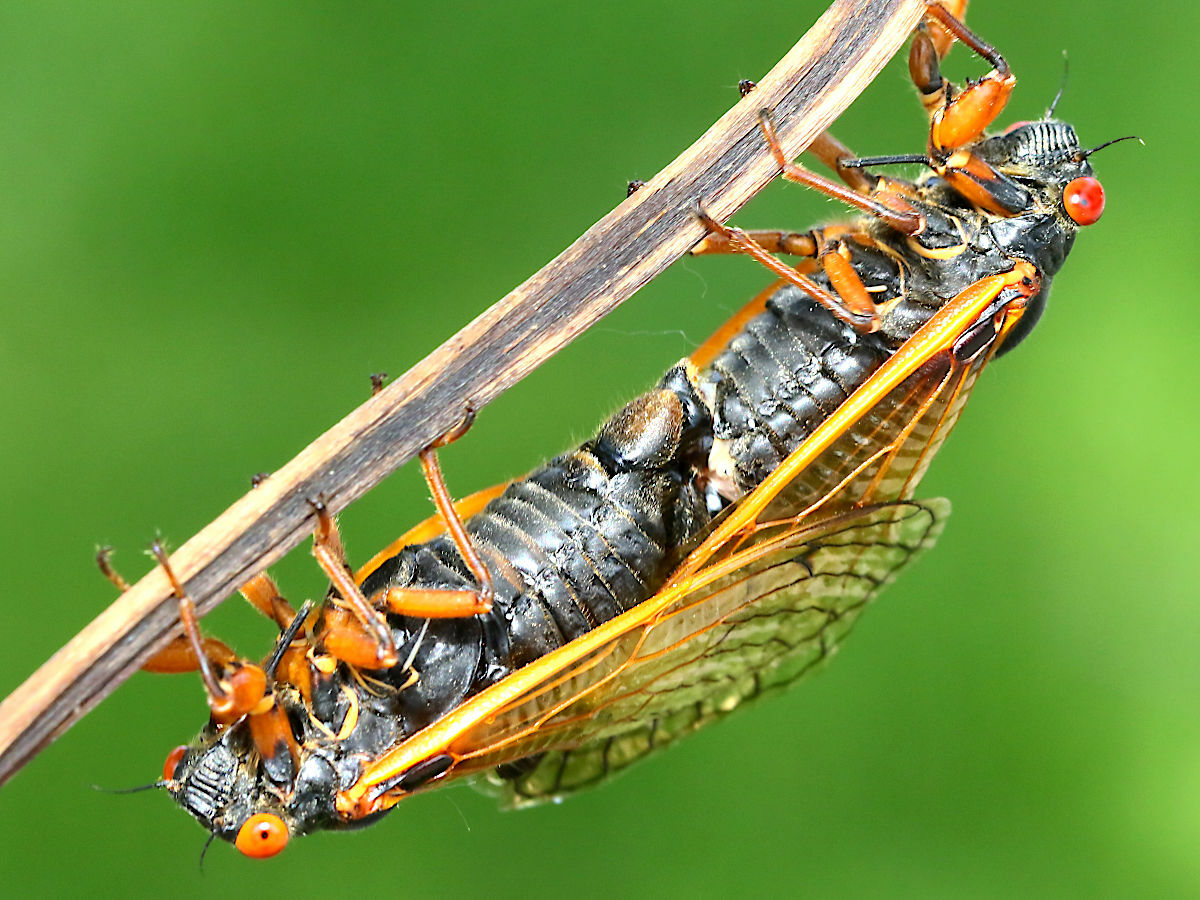
Mating pair Brood XIII, 2024

Female molting Brood XIII, 2024

Female ovipositing Brood XIII, 2024

== Damage ==
In outbreak years, the cicadas do significant damage to the trees on which they lay eggs, especially saplings. The female cuts a slit in a twig in which to insert her eggs and this often causes the shoot to droop and defoliate. In larger twigs it may allow entry of disease organisms. The burden of feeding of the nymphs is also considerable. However, it has been shown that there is little long-term harm to mature trees.

== Alleged reward for blue eyed cicadas ==
A popular reoccurring urban legend purports to say that rare blue (or white) eyed cicadas will fetch rewards of up to one million dollars. According to the legend, biological laboratories, particularly at Vanderbilt University, will pay a reward to any who catch such a specimen. And while it is true that blue eyed cicadas are extremely rare, occurring in only about one in every million insects, no laboratories currently offer any such reward. However, Roy Troutman, an American entomologist and cicada researcher, did in fact offer rewards for living blue eyed cicadas for cicada research in 2008. He is no longer offering rewards.
