= Ethan Tapper =

American forester

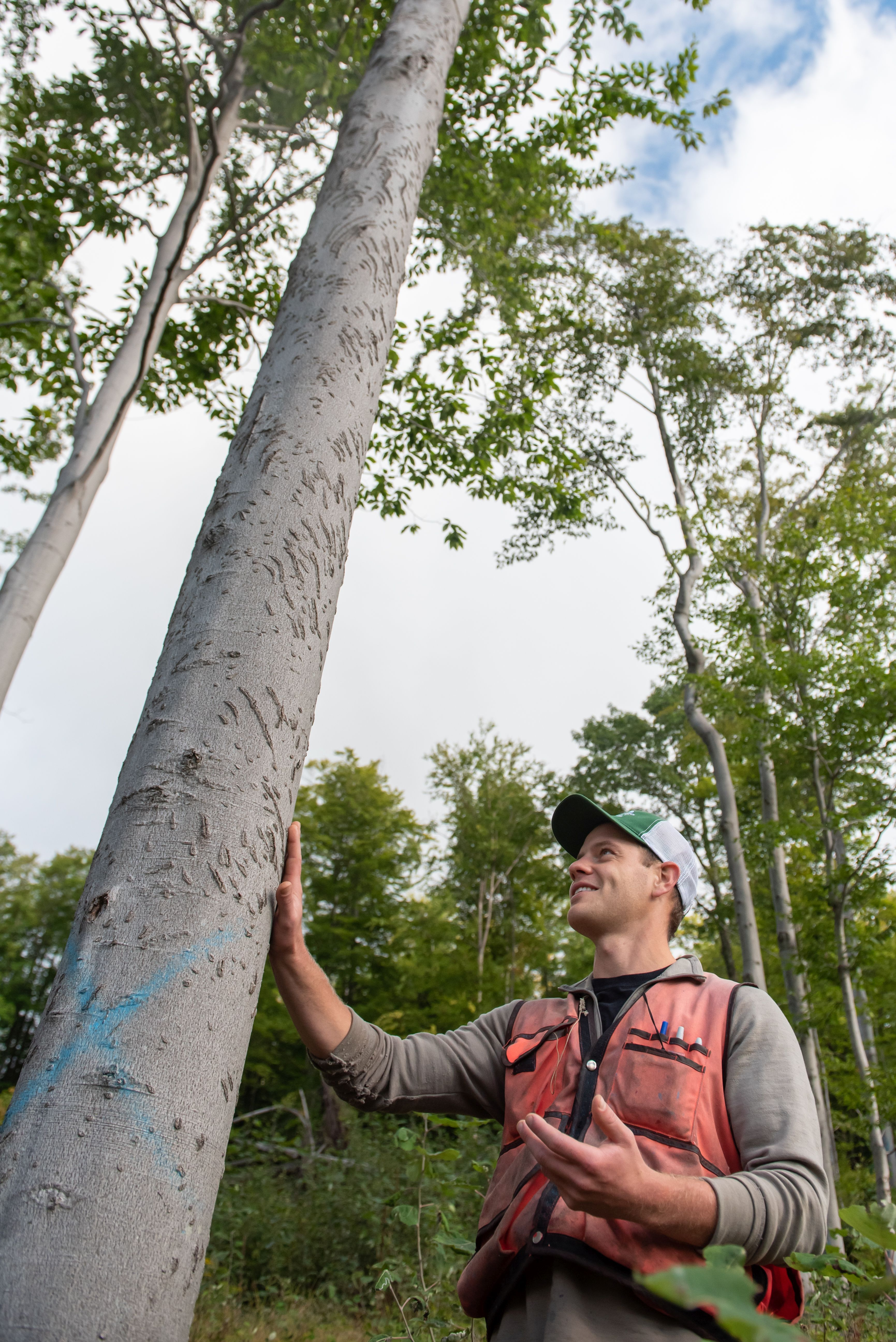
Ethan Tapper

Ethan Tapper is a Vermont-based forester, author, content creator and musician. He is the author of The Forest Year: Finding Hope in a World Worth Saving, published on October 6, 2026.

== Early life ==
Tapper grew up in Saxtons River, Vermont. Self-described as somewhat aimless in high school, he nevertheless graduated third in his class and received a prestigious Green and Gold Scholarship to the University of Vermont. Unsure of his best course of study, he enrolled in a 6-month wilderness experience that influenced him deeply, leading to years of work as a wilderness guide. When the scholarship required his return to college, he re-enrolled as a forestry major. He graduated in 2012 from UVM's Rubenstein School of Environment and Natural Resources with a Forestry degree.

== Career ==
Tapper holds a B.S. in forestry and a M.S. in Natural Resources from the University of Vermont. After graduating, Tapper worked as a consulting forester with Fountains Forestry of Montpelier, Vermont. In June 2016, he became Vermont's Chittenden County Forester, at 26 the youngest ever in the 75-year history of the county forester program, a role that he held from 2016 to 2024. In that role, he advised and consulted with local landowners, towns, and businesses on the long-term management of their forests. He also worked to engage local communities in their shared ownership and stewardship of the land. Today, Tapper runs a consulting forestry business called Bear Island Forestry and manages his own 175-acre forest, which he calls Bear Island. He's been endorsed by Audubon as a bird-friendly forester and bird-friendly maple sugarmaker.

As a service forester, Tapper has led hundreds of public events in Vermont. Since the publication of How to Love a Forest, he has done hundreds of talks and other educational events for conferences, conservation organizations and community groups across the United States and Canada. Tapper also has an active presence on social media, with hundreds of thousands of followers, and posts hundreds of videos each year about environmental topics on platforms like Instagram and YouTube.

== Writing ==
As Chittenden County Forester, Tapper wrote regularly for local newspapers and other periodicals on general forestry topics. Seeking to tell a more broad and personal story, in 2024 he published his first book How to Love a Forest: The Bittersweet Work of Tending a Changing World. The book was well-received, garnered positive attention from statewide and national media, was endorsed by Bill McKibben, Doug Tallamy and Ben Goldfarb, among others, and was named the winner of the 2025 New England Book Award in the non-fiction category.

Tapper's second book was Willow and the Storm – A Children's Book About Ecology, Regeneration, Resilience and the End of Life, and was illustrated by Frances Cannon. Willow and the Storm was Tapper's response to the idea that people often misunderstand the often-positive role that death plays in forests, and that this seemed linked to people's difficult relationship with death in general.

Tapper's third book is called 'The Forest Year: Finding Hope in a World Worth Saving, was published on October 6, 2026. According to EthanTapper.com: "The Forest Year expands the world of How to Love a Forest, following Ethan across a single year of life and stewardship at Bear Island – his 175-acre forest in Vermont. The Forest Year is a book about trees, forests, birds and wildflowers, and also about community, resilience, stewardship and the profound and beautiful thing that happens when we decide to stay." Regarding The Forest Year, environmental author Doug Tallamy wrote: "Set a seat at the table, Wendell Berry; Ethan Tapper has arrived!"

== Personal life ==
Tapper has been open about several struggles in his life, including the trauma of losing the vision in his left eye at the age of 19, a chainsaw accident that nearly blinded him in his right eye in 2020 and required multiple reconstructive surgeries.

Tapper is the lead singer and guitarist for the Burlington, Vermont-based punk rock band The Bubs. In an interview with the Burlington Free Press, Tapper described commonalities between his musical endeavors and his methods of forest management.

== Publications ==
=== Books ===
- How to Love a Forest: The Bittersweet Work of Tending a Changing World, Broadleaf Books, 2024 ISBN 9798889830559
- Willow and the Storm (with Frances Cannon, Illustrator), Green Writers Press, 2025 ISBN 9798989178469
- The Forest Year: Finding Hope in a World Worth Saving, Timber Press, 2026 ISBN 9781643266510

== Awards and recognition ==
- 2025 New England Book Award winner - for How to Love a Forest: The Bittersweet Work of Tending a Changing World - Non-fiction category
- 2025 Vermont Book Award Finalist - for How to Love a Forest: The Bittersweet Work of Tending a Changing World
- 2025 Society of American Foresters "W.G Hagenstein Communicator Award"
- 2025 Vermont Woodworks Council "Friend of the Industry Award"
- 2024 Massachusetts Forest Alliance "Friend of Forestry Award"
- 2024 American Tree Farm System "National Tree Farm Inspector of the Year"
- 2021 Northeast-Midwest State Foresters’ Alliance "Forester of the Year"
- 2020 Vermont Coverts "James B. Engle Award"
