= Tallamy =

Tallamy is a surname. Notable people with this surname include:

- Bertram D. Tallamy (1901–1989), American Federal Highway Administrator
- Douglas Tallamy (fl. 2007), American entomologist
