= Brood XIX =

Periodical cicada brood

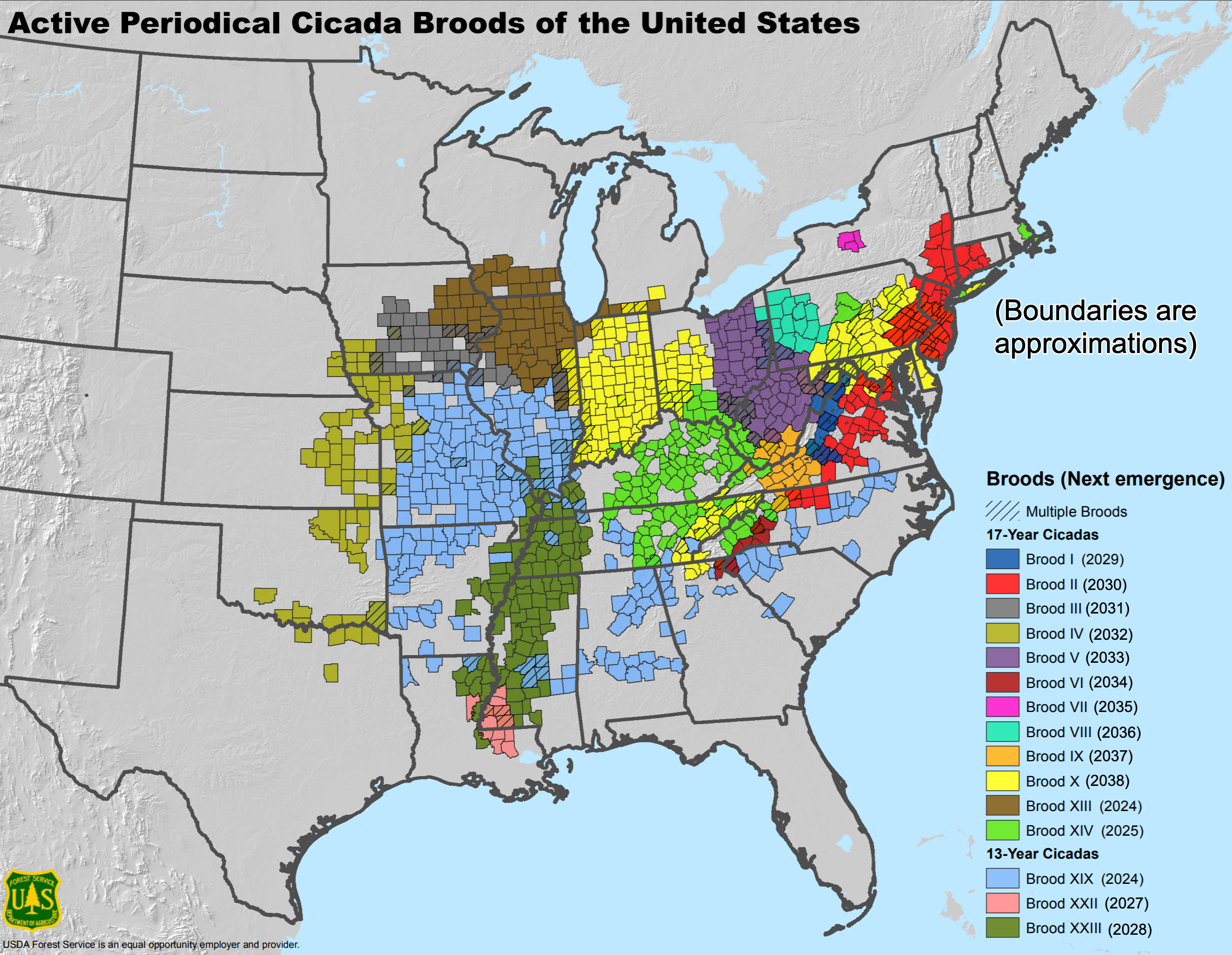
Map of periodic cicada broods with Brood XIX shown in light blue

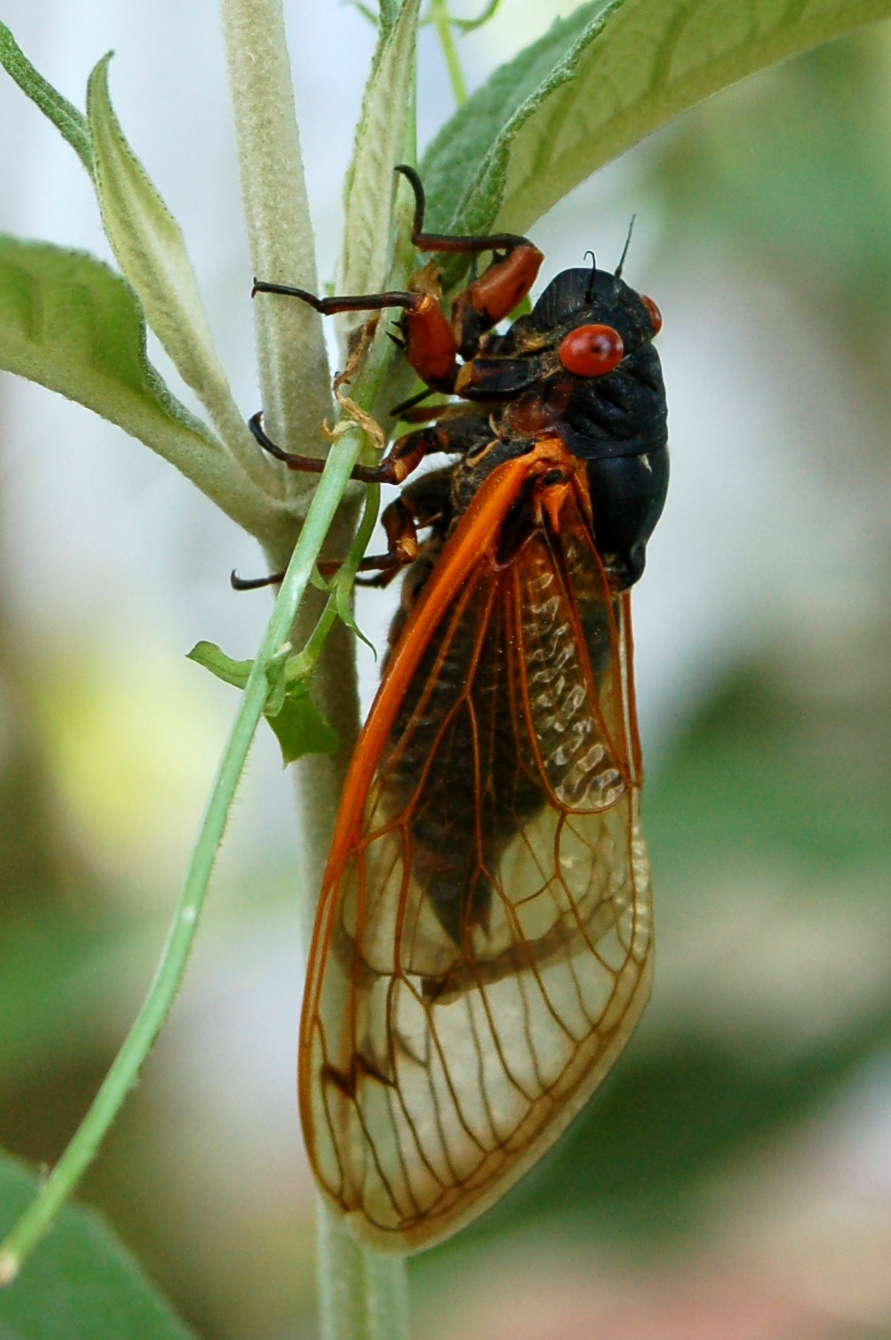
Cicada from Brood XIX, Chapel Hill, North Carolina, May 29, 2011

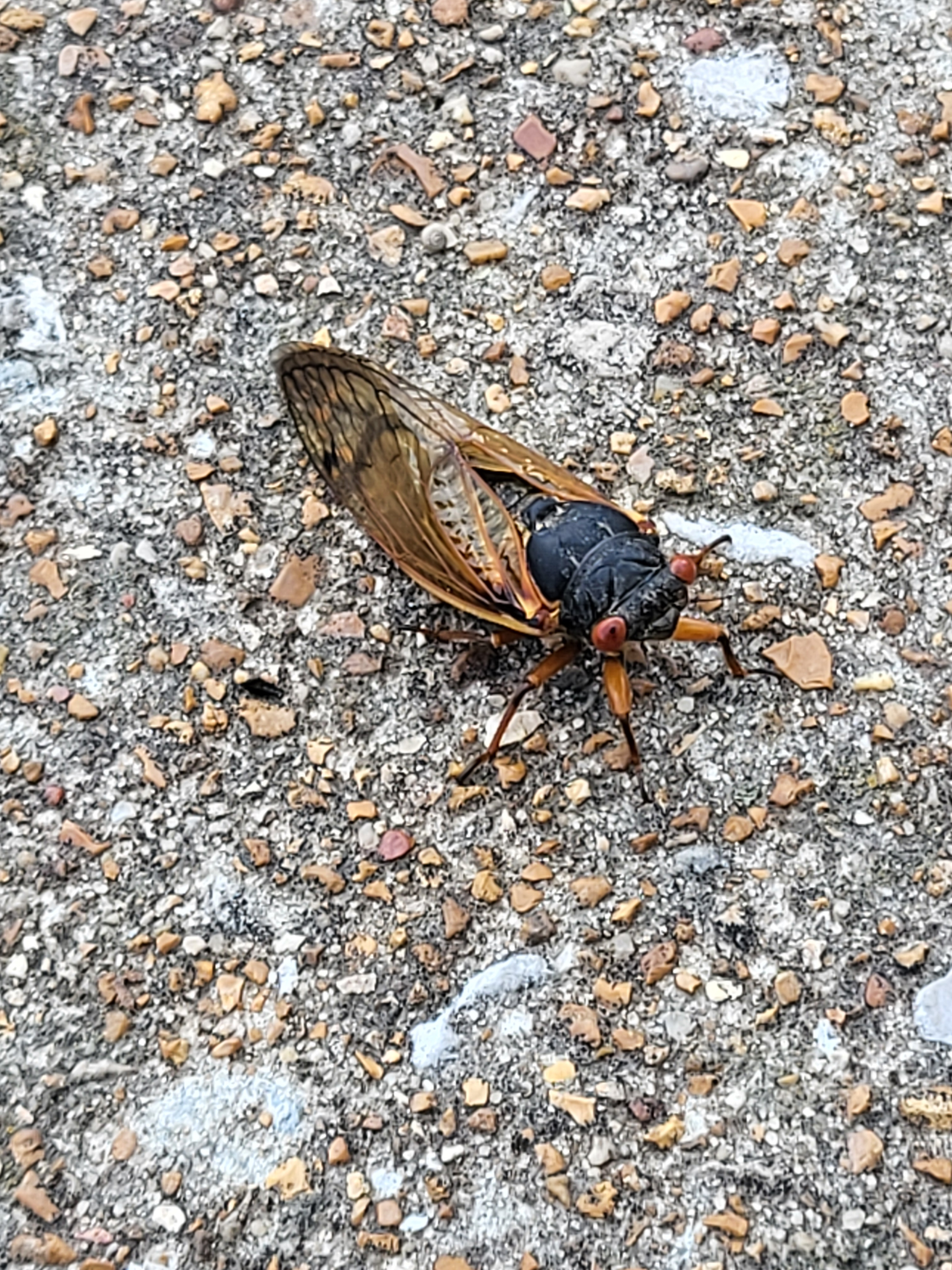
Brood XIX cicada from St. Louis, Missouri, 15 May 2024

Brood XIX (also known as The Great Southern Brood) is the largest (most widely distributed) brood of 13-year periodical cicadas, last seen in 2024 across a wide stretch of the southeastern United States. Periodical cicadas (Magicicada spp.) are often referred to as "17-year locusts" because most of the known distinct broods have a 17-year life cycle. Brood XIX is one of only three surviving broods with a 13-year cycle. It is also notable because it includes four different 13-year species, one of which was discovered in Brood XIX in 1998 by scientists listening to cicada songs.

== Position among other broods of cicadas ==
In 1907, entomologist C. L. Marlatt postulated the existence of 30 different broods of periodical cicadas: 17 distinct broods with a 17-year life cycle, to which he assigned Roman numerals I through XVII (with emerging years 1893 through 1909); plus 13 broods with a 13-year cycle, to which he assigned Roman numerals XVIII through XXX (1893 through 1905). Many of these hypothetical broods, however, have not been observed. Today only 15 are recognized.

Brood XIX is one of three extant broods of 13-year cicadas. The other two are Broods XXII and XXIII, expected to re-emerge in 2027 and 2028 respectively. A fourth 13-year brood, Brood XXI (The Floridian Brood) was last recorded in 1870 in the Florida panhandle, but is believed to be now extinct.

== Species present ==
Brood XIX includes all four different species of 13-year cicadas: Magicicada tredecim (Walsh and Riley, 1868), Magicicada tredecassini (Alexander and Moore, 1962), Magicicada tredecula (Alexander and Moore, 1962), and the recently discovered Magicicada neotredecim (Marshall and Cooley, 2000). 2011 was the first appearance of Brood XIX since the discovery of the new species, which was first observed in this brood in 1998 when scientists observed an unexpected peak of acoustical frequencies in the brood's song.

The two species M. tredecim and M. neotredecim have an unusual geographical relationship in Brood XIX, with only a slight overlap between them, in a narrow band from northern Arkansas to southern Indiana. The other 13-year species occur together throughout the brood range, so in most parts of the range only three of the four species are present. All four 13-year species have distinct male calling songs, but the songs of M. tredecim and M. neotredecim in their narrow range of overlap show reproductive character displacement (RCD) that makes them even more distinct. (RCD functions to prevent reproductive overlap.) RCD is particularly noticeable in Brood XIX.

For Brood XIX in Alabama, adults of M. tredecula are less common than those of M. tredecim and M. tredecassini.

== Geographical distribution ==
Most maps of cicada distribution originate from 19th-century compilations that may show ranges much wider than those of current broods. The National Geographic Society is gathering reports from the public about the geographical distribution of Brood XIX as part of a larger project to remap the distribution of Magicicada. Older maps show occurrences of Brood XIX cicadas in Missouri, Arkansas, Louisiana, Mississippi, Tennessee, Kentucky, Indiana, Virginia, North Carolina, South Carolina, and Georgia.

Across most of the range of Brood XIX, one observes M. tredecim in the southern regions and M. neotredecim in more northern ones, with some overlap in the westernmost region (mostly Missouri and Illinois).

== 2011 emergence ==
In early May 2011, cicadas began emerging throughout an area roughly enclosed by Georgia, Texas, Alabama, North Carolina, Missouri, and Tennessee. The next two appearances will be in 2037 and 2050.

News reports of the cicadas' emergence in Illinois included links to a video showing holes in the ground left by larval emergence, an adult cicada breaking out of its larval shell, and massed adult cicadas marching up tree trunks.

By June 8, 2011, a North Carolina newspaper reported that adult cicadas, which typically live for about a month, were dying en masse. Nymphs from eggs that have been laid by Brood XIX females emerged from the earth again in 2024, restarting the cycle.

== 2024 emergence, etc. ==
Brood XIX of the 13-year cicada, arguably the largest (by geographic extent) of all periodical cicada broods, and Brood XIII of the 17-year cicada, which reputably has the largest emergence of cicadas by size known anywhere, emerged together in 2024 for the first time since 1803. However, the two broods did not overlap except in a thin area in central and eastern Illinois (Macon, Sangamon, Livingston, and Logan counties). Therefore, the density of cicadas in most areas were the same as usual. The next such dual emergence of Brood XIX and Brood XIII is expected to occur in 2245, 221 years after 2024, but after 2024, the next eight successive emergences of Brood XIX will be dual emergences, with eight different 17-year Broods—in 2024 (with Brood XIII), 2037 (Brood IX), 2050 (Brood V), 2063 (Brood I), 2076 (Brood XIV), 2089 (Brood X), 2102 (Brood VI), and 2115 (Brood II)—so it will not be until 2128 that Brood XIX will be the only Brood emerging that year.

== Bibliography ==
- Magicicada Central
- More, Thomas, Singing Insects of North America, University of Florida map
- Post, Susan L. The Trill of a Life Time, photographs by Michael R. Jeffords, The Illinois Steward, Spring 2004.
- Stannard, Jr., Lewis. The Distribution of Periodical Cicadas in Illinois, 1975.
