= Saxtons River, Vermont =

- Village
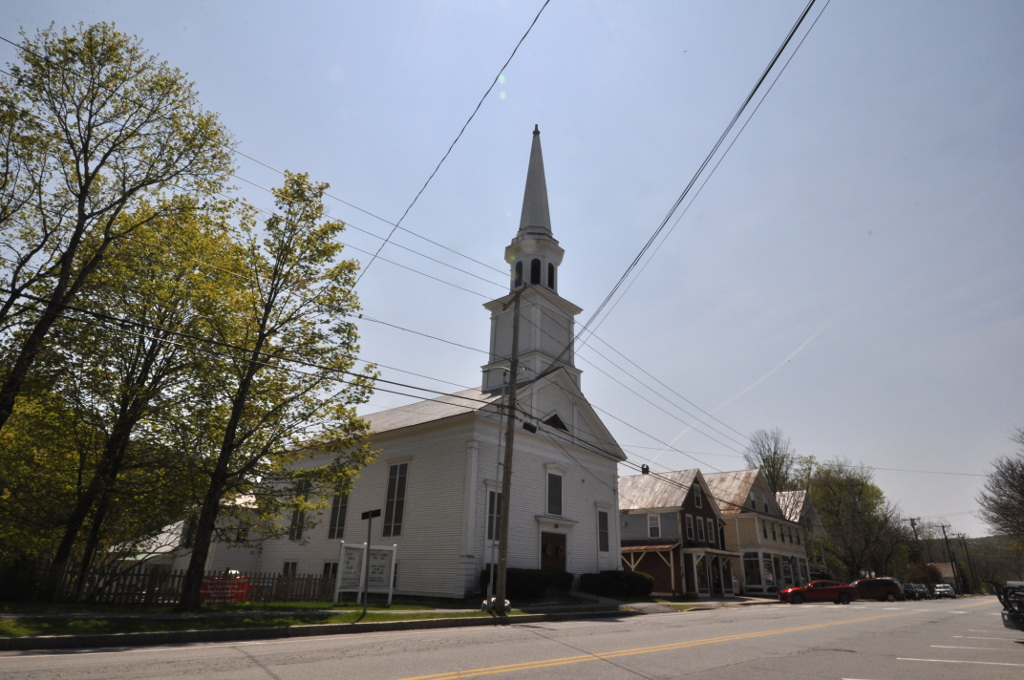
- Historic building in Saxtons River

- Location within the state of Vermont
- Coordinates: 43°08′20″N 72°30′37″W
- Country: United States
- State: Vermont
- County: Windham
- Town: Rockingham

Area
  - Total: 0.49 sq mi (1.26 km^{2})
  - Land: 0.47 sq mi (1.22 km^{2})
  - Water: 0.015 sq mi (0.04 km^{2})
- Elevation: 492 ft (150 m)

Population (2020)
  - Total: 479
  - Density: 1,020/sq mi (393/km^{2})
- Time zone: UTC-5 (Eastern (EST))
  - Summer (DST): UTC-4 (EDT)
- ZIP Codes: 05154 (Saxtons River); 05101 (Bellows Falls)
- Area code: 802
- FIPS code: 50-62950
- GNIS feature ID: 2378327

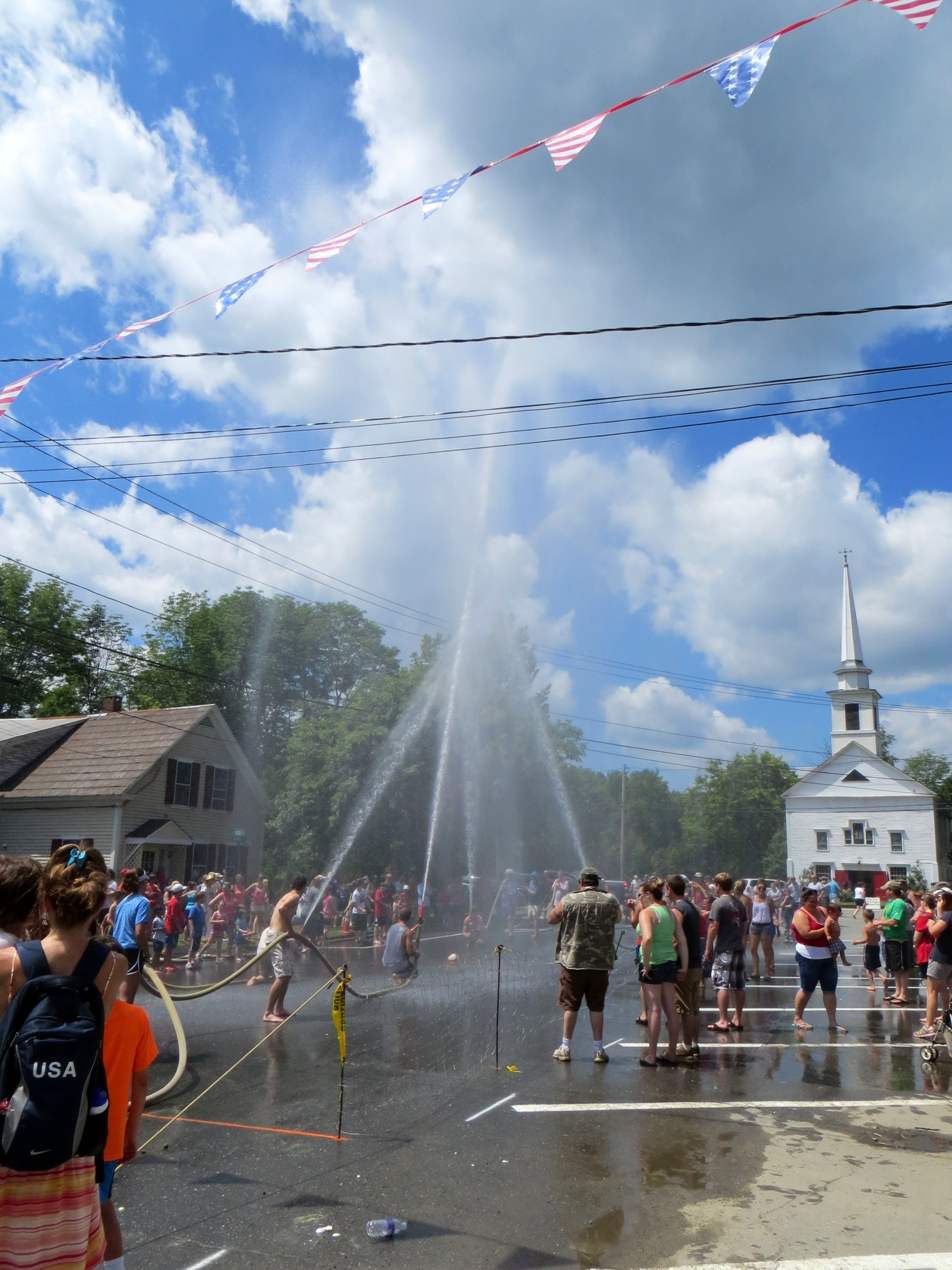
Start of a game of water polo on Main St, Saxtons River, after the 4th of July parade in 2013.

Saxtons River is an incorporated village in the town of Rockingham in Windham County, Vermont, United States. The population was 479 at the 2020 census. For over a hundred years, Saxtons River has been the home of Vermont Academy, an independent secondary school. Most of the village is a historic district listed on the National Register of Historic Places in 1986 as Saxtons River Village Historic District.

== Geography ==
According to the United States Census Bureau, the village has a total area of 0.5 square mile (1.3 km^{2}), all land.

== History ==
According to Bellows Falls-based historian Lyman Simpson Hayes, writing in 1907’s History of the Town of Rockingham, the first settlement of the area that would become Saxtons River occurred in 1783, when Amos P. Cummings cut down the first trees of an “entirely unbroken wilderness of immense trees of primitive growth.” As late as 1795, there existed only two houses in the village — population growth was extremely slow.

A meeting house was built and the village cemetery established in 1810, and the first textile mill was opened at the Middle Falls (now officially named Saxtons River Falls) in 1815. The village bounds were determined by the town in 1820, and it was formally incorporated as a village in 1905, which is overseen by a board of trustees elected by registered voters of the Village.

By 1828, the village contained the aforementioned meeting house (which by this point was the public school building), a post office, mills of various sorts (grist, saw, fulling), a tannery, a forge, a tavern, a distillery, two stores, one law office and forty-five dwellings. By 1907, Saxtons River was a “flourishing village of about nine hundred and fifty inhabitants, with a variety of mills and other industries.”

From 1900-1924, Rockingham's two incorporated villages were linked by the Bellows Falls & Saxtons River Railroad, an electric train system. The company created Barbers Park, east of the Saxtons River about halfway between the villages, to which summertime crowds took the trolleys to baseball games and amusement rides. Although Saxtons River village had a long history of industry, much of it had failed by the 1920s.

Located mostly inside the Village boundaries, and a strong influence on the character and economy of Saxtons River, is Vermont Academy, a private, co-educational high school founded in 1876. Vermont Academy established an annual Winter Carnival early in the 20th century, contributing to the creation of New England's winter recreation culture. Student enrollment is around 230.

After a period of decline in the mid-20th century, many of the older buildings, such as the Saxtons River Inn, were restored and rehabilitated.

In 1974, the Campbell family (which at that time represented 1/40th of the population of the village according to the New York Times article "21 Campbells and One Charming Vermont Inn") reopened the aging Saxtons River Inn, "a 1903 relic on Main Street", full of peeling paint and "hoods of abandoned Cadillacs propped up on the sagging porches." After a year-long "kind of super barn raising", with help from the community, the refurbished Inn became a mainstay of the community for decades with a bar, dining room and 10 guest rooms. The Inn has continued to change hands over the years, but still survives.

Historic buildings include:

- Congregational Church (Main Street), now the Saxtons River Historical Society; 1836, 1871
- Saxtons River Village Building (Upper Main Street); c. 1860, c. 1970
- Maple Grove, Smith-Bancroft-Neill House (Upper Main Street); c. 1830
- Warner Block-Odd Fellows Building (Main Street); c. 1850
- Sabin-Bryant Block (Main and School Street); c. 1865
- Saxtons River Public School (School Street); 1915
- Saxtons River Inn (Main Street and Academy Avenue); 1903
- "The Beehive" (Academy Avenue); c. 1860
- Simonds Store - Saxtons River Village Market (Main Street and Academy Avenue); c. 1870
- Tin Shop or Saxwin Building (Main and Maple Streets); c. 1850
- Baptist Church (Main Street), now Christ's Church, UCC; 1840
- Fuller Hardware Store (Main Street); c. 1830
- Saxtons River Woolen Mill foundation (Maple Street); c. 1847 and later.
- Wool Pulling Shop (River Street); c. 1870
- Old South Meetinghouse site (Westminster Street)
- Saxtons River Cemetery (off Westminster Street)
- Tenney's Lumber Mill (off Westminster Street); 1870
- Thompson Gristmill (Westminster Street); c. 1850

== Demographics ==
Historical population
Census	Pop.	Note	%±
1930	670		—
1940	740		10.4%
1950	715		−3.4%
1960	725		1.4%
1970	581		−19.9%
1980	593		2.1%
1990	541		−8.8%
2000	519		−4.1%
2010	565		8.9%
U.S. Decennial Census

As of the 2010 Census, there were 565 people in 210 households in the village. The population density was 1,130 people per square mile (434.6/km^{2}). The racial makeup of the village was 94.65% White, 1.6% Asian, 0.4% African American, 0.5% from other races, and 2.5% from two or more races. Hispanic or Latino of any race were 2.85% of the population.

In the village, the population was spread out, with 29.3% under the age of 18, 8.4% from 18 to 24, 13.1% from 25 to 34, 40.5% from 35 to 64, and 14.2% who were 65 years of age or older. Median age was 37.6 years.

== Notable people ==
- Horace Henry Baxter, Adjutant General of the Vermont Militia during the American Civil War
- John Butler Smith, 44th governor of New Hampshire
- Ethan Tapper Author, Forester
- Charles C. Tillinghast Jr., president and CEO of Trans World Airlines

== Gallery ==
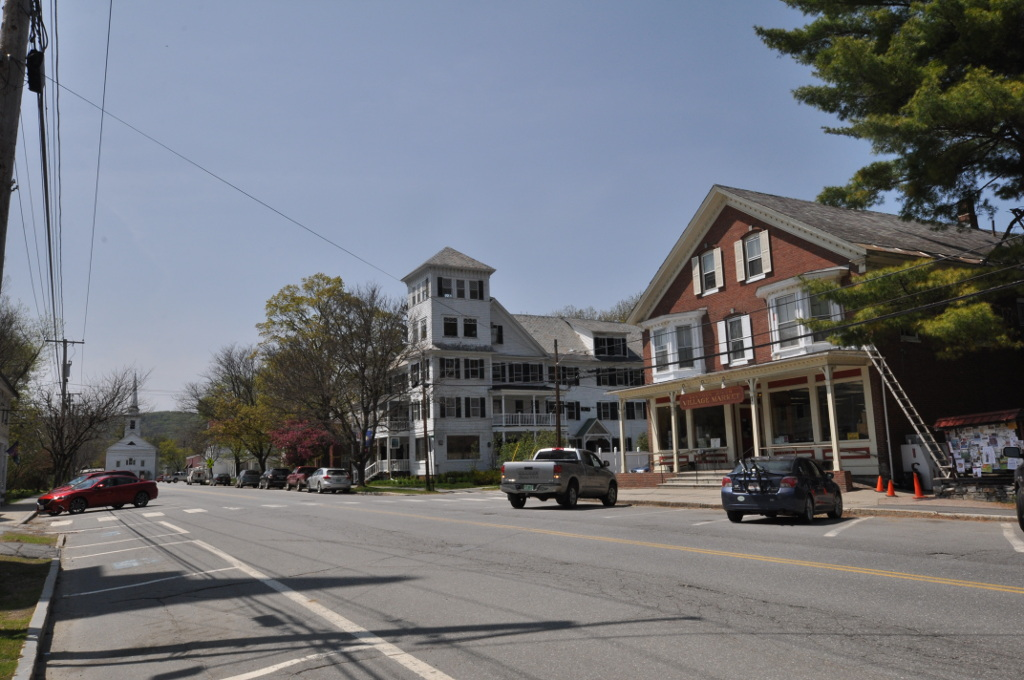
Main Street Saxtons River — showcasing the Inn at Saxtons River and the Village Market on the right

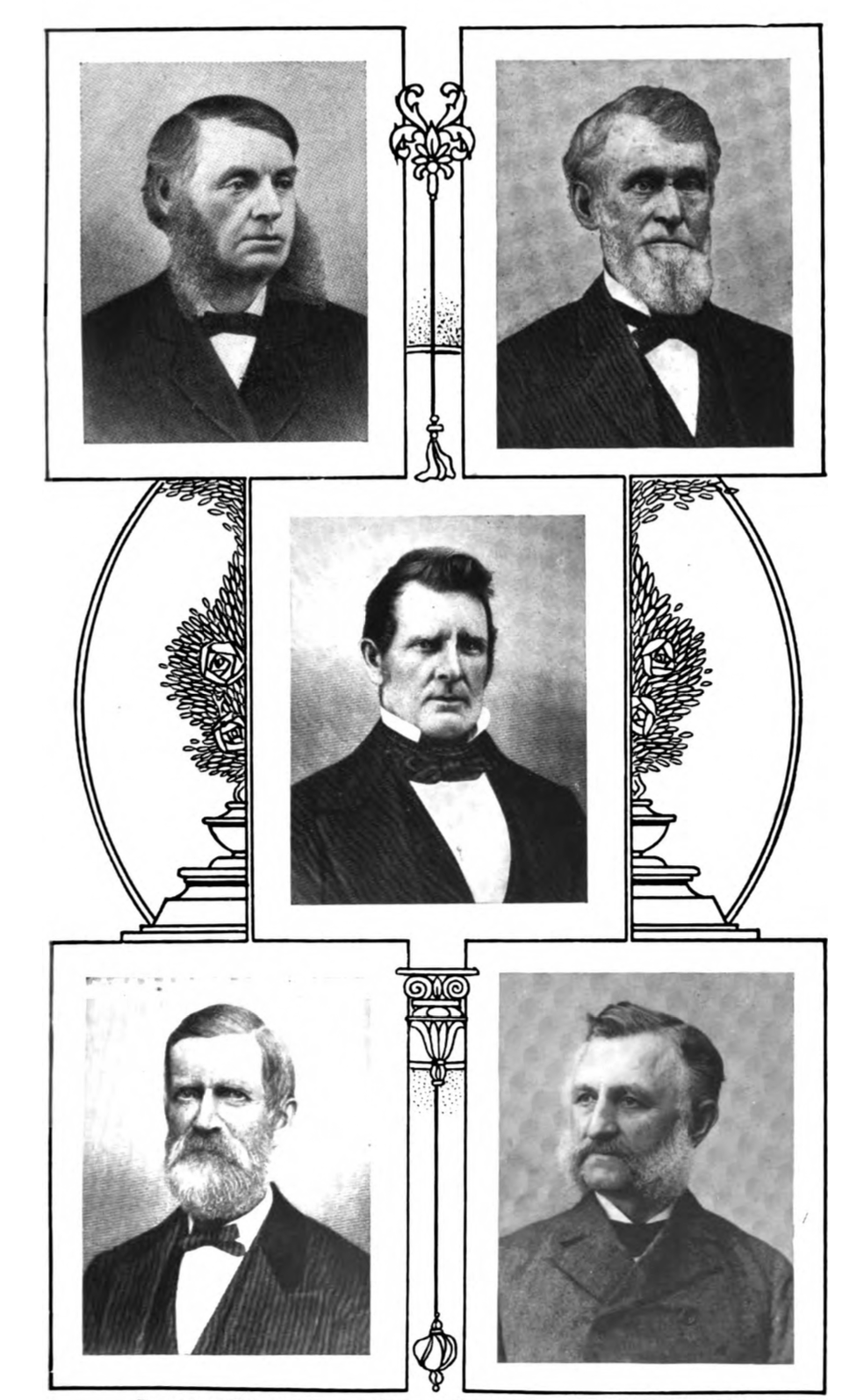
19th Century Woolen Manufacturers of Saxtons River

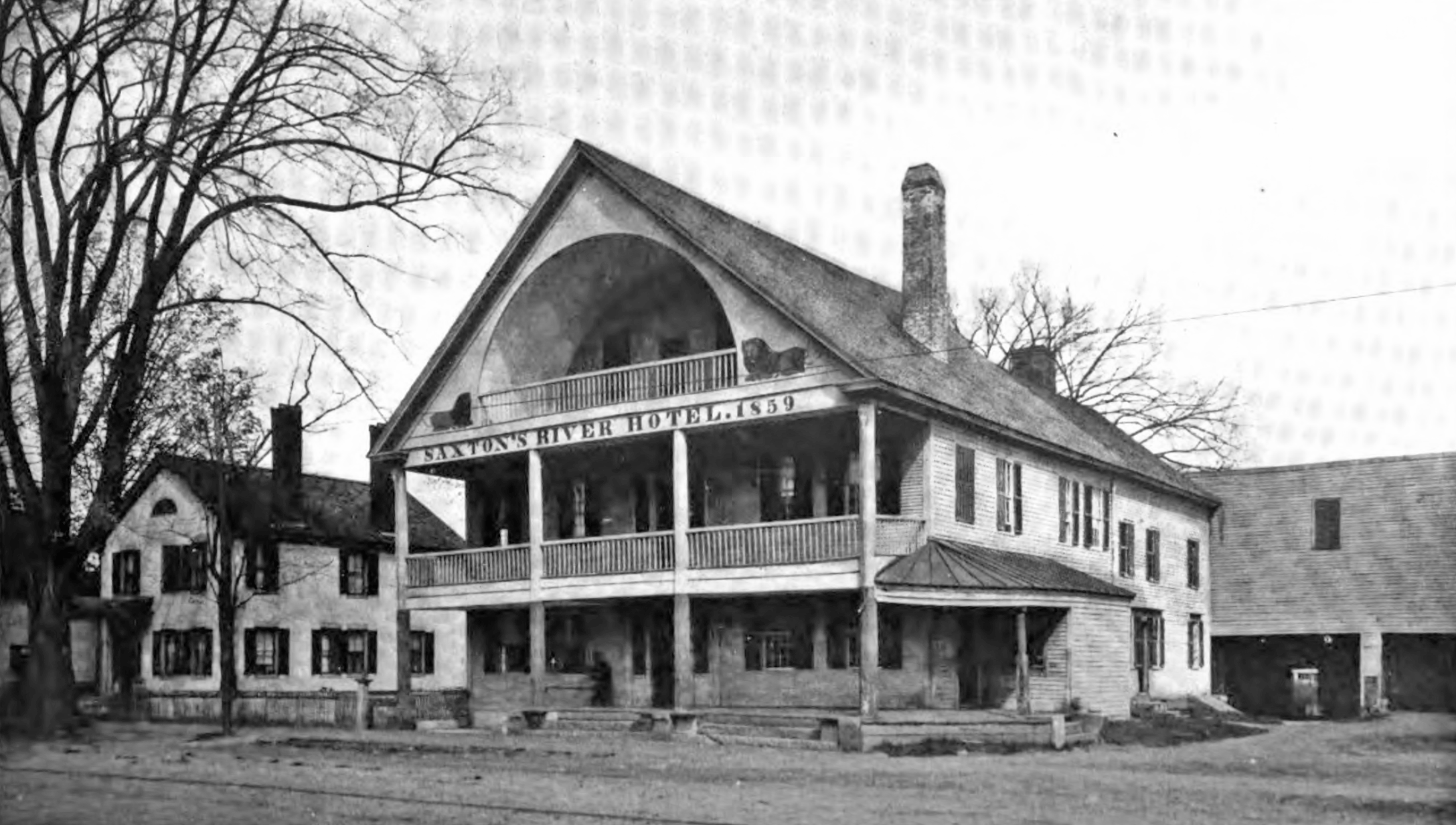
The Saxton's River Hotel [sic] before it was taken down in 1903.

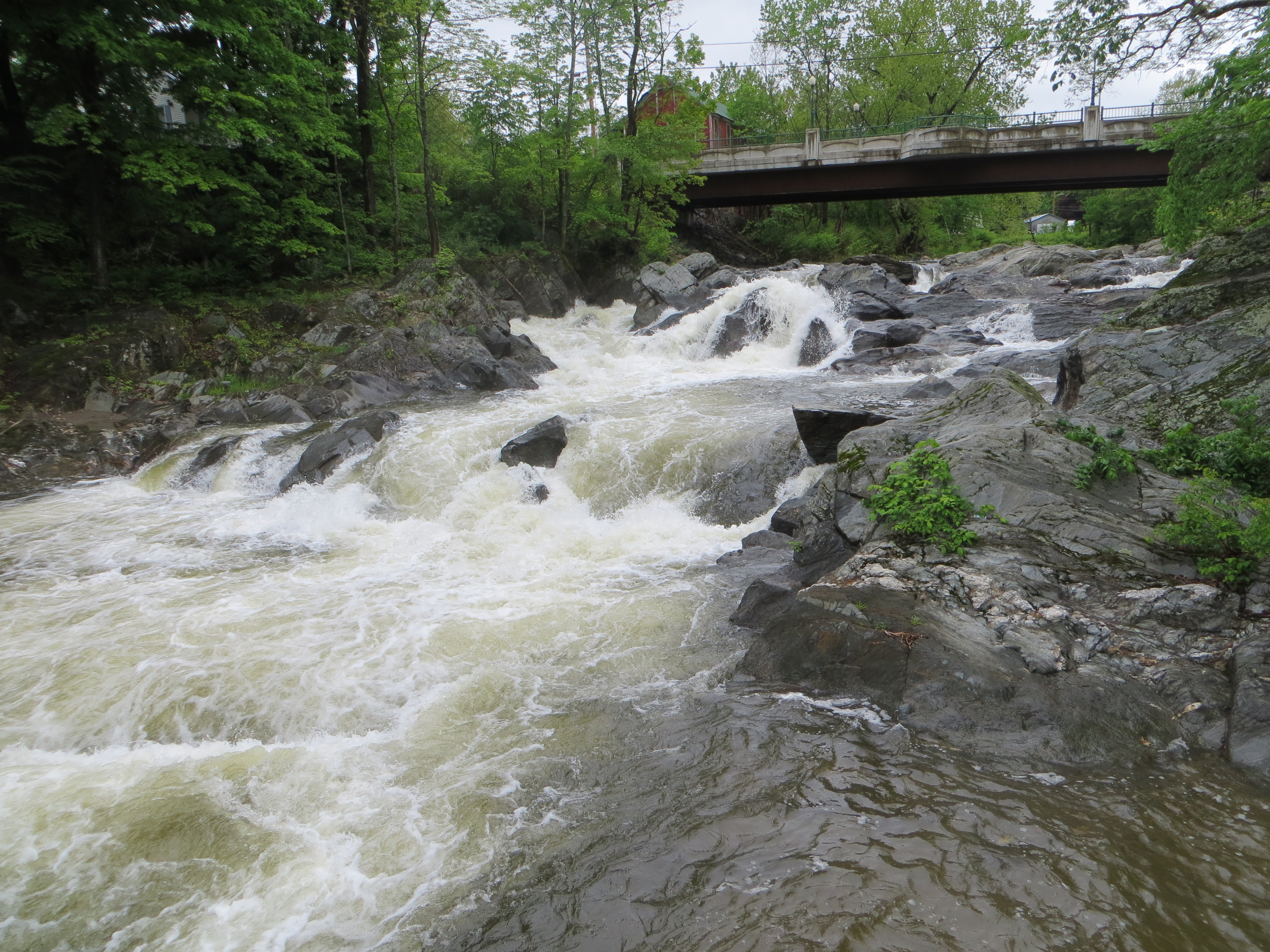
Saxtons River Falls, or Middle Falls as it was historically known.

== See also ==
- National Register of Historic Places listings in Windham County, Vermont
