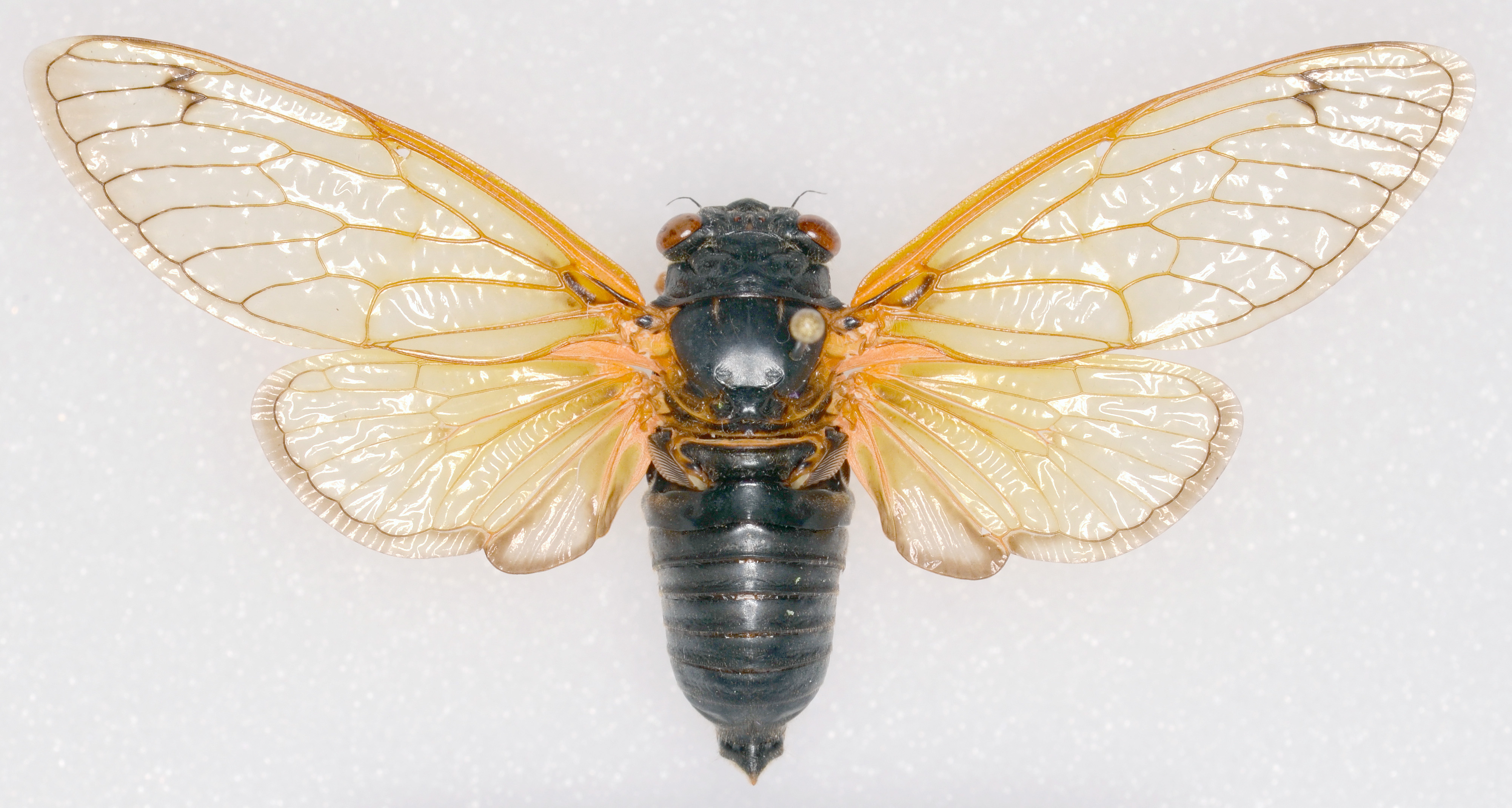

Scientific classification
- Domain: Eukaryota
- Kingdom: Animalia
- Phylum: Arthropoda
- Class: Insecta
- Order: Hemiptera
- Suborder: Auchenorrhyncha
- Family: Cicadidae
- Genus: Magicicada
- Species: M. tredecassini

Binomial name
- Magicicada tredecassini (Alexander & Moore, 1962)

= Magicicada tredecassini =

Species of true bug

Magicicada tredecassini is a species of periodical cicada endemic to the United States. It has a 13-year lifecycle but is otherwise indistinguishable from the 17-year periodical cicada Magicicada cassini. The two species are usually discussed together as "cassini periodical cicadas" or "cassini-type periodical cicadas." Unlike other periodical cicadas, cassini-type males may synchronize their courting behavior so that tens of thousands of males sing and fly in unison.

== Life cycle ==
Their median life cycle from egg to natural adult death is around thirteen years. However, their life cycle can range from nine years to seventeen years.
