= Douglas Tallamy =

American entomologist

- Born: c. 1951 (Note: Reported as 68 years old in Smithsonian, April 2020.)
- Education: Allegheny College (BS); Rutgers University (MS); University of Maryland (PhD)
- Known for: Homegrown National Park; Native-plant gardening advocacy; Keystone plants concept
- Spouse: Cindy Tallamy
- Scientific career
- Fields: Entomology, ecology
- Workplaces: University of Delaware

Douglas Tallamy, known as Doug Tallamy, is an American entomologist, ecologist and conservationist. He is the T. A. Baker Professor of Agriculture and Natural Resources in the Department of Entomology and Wildlife Ecology at the University of Delaware. Tallamy has written and co-authored several popular books. He is also one of the founders of Homegrown National Park, a nonprofit organization promoting habitat restoration and biodiversity on public and private lands through the planting of native plants and removal of invasive species.

Tallamy's research examines how native and introduced plants differ in their ability to support insect herbivores and the animals that feed on them. His books argue that home gardeners can counter biodiversity loss by planting natives. Bringing Nature Home (2007) and Nature's Best Hope (2020) helped popularize native-plant gardening in the United States.

== Early life and education ==
Tallamy earned a Bachelor of Science in biology from Allegheny College in 1973, a Master of Science in entomology from Rutgers University in 1976, and a PhD in entomology from the University of Maryland in 1980. Working in the laboratory of the salt-marsh insect ecologist Robert Denno, his doctoral-era research examined the habitat use and dispersal of Hemiptera. He then held a postdoctoral fellowship in entomology at the University of Iowa from 1980 to 1981.

== Career ==
Tallamy joined the faculty of the University of Delaware in 1982. He holds the T. A. Baker Professorship of Agriculture and Natural Resources in the Department of Entomology and Wildlife Ecology. His early research focused on insect behavior and the biology of agricultural pests, particularly the spotted cucumber beetle and other leaf beetles.

Around 2000, Tallamy and his wife bought a roughly 10-acre (4.0 ha) former hayfield in southeastern Pennsylvania, near the University of Delaware campus. The land had been colonized by introduced Asian plants such as autumn olive and Oriental bittersweet, and Tallamy noticed that their foliage was largely uneaten by native caterpillars. A literature search by one of his students found no published research on the consequences for food webs of replacing native vegetation with introduced species, and Tallamy redirected his research towards that question, citing the biologist E. O. Wilson as an influence.

== Research ==
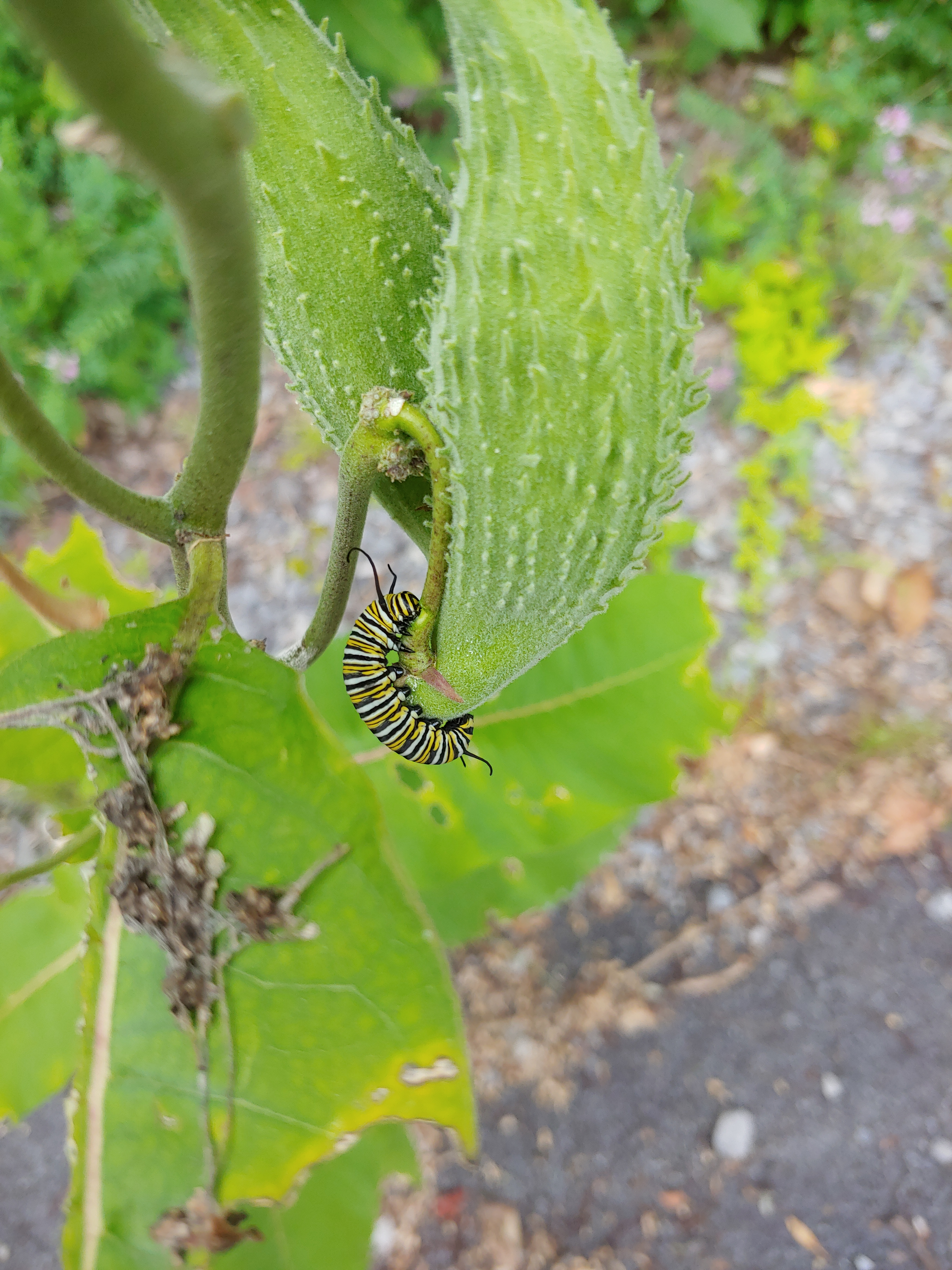
Monarch butterfly caterpillar on milkweed. Tallamy's work has documented how specialist insects depend on a narrow range of native plants.

Tallamy's recent research compares how native and introduced plants support insects, and how those differences affect animals higher in the food web. In a 2009 study in Conservation Biology, Tallamy and Kimberley J. Shropshire ranked the use of native and introduced plants by Lepidoptera, finding that native woody plants supported substantially more caterpillar species than introduced ones.

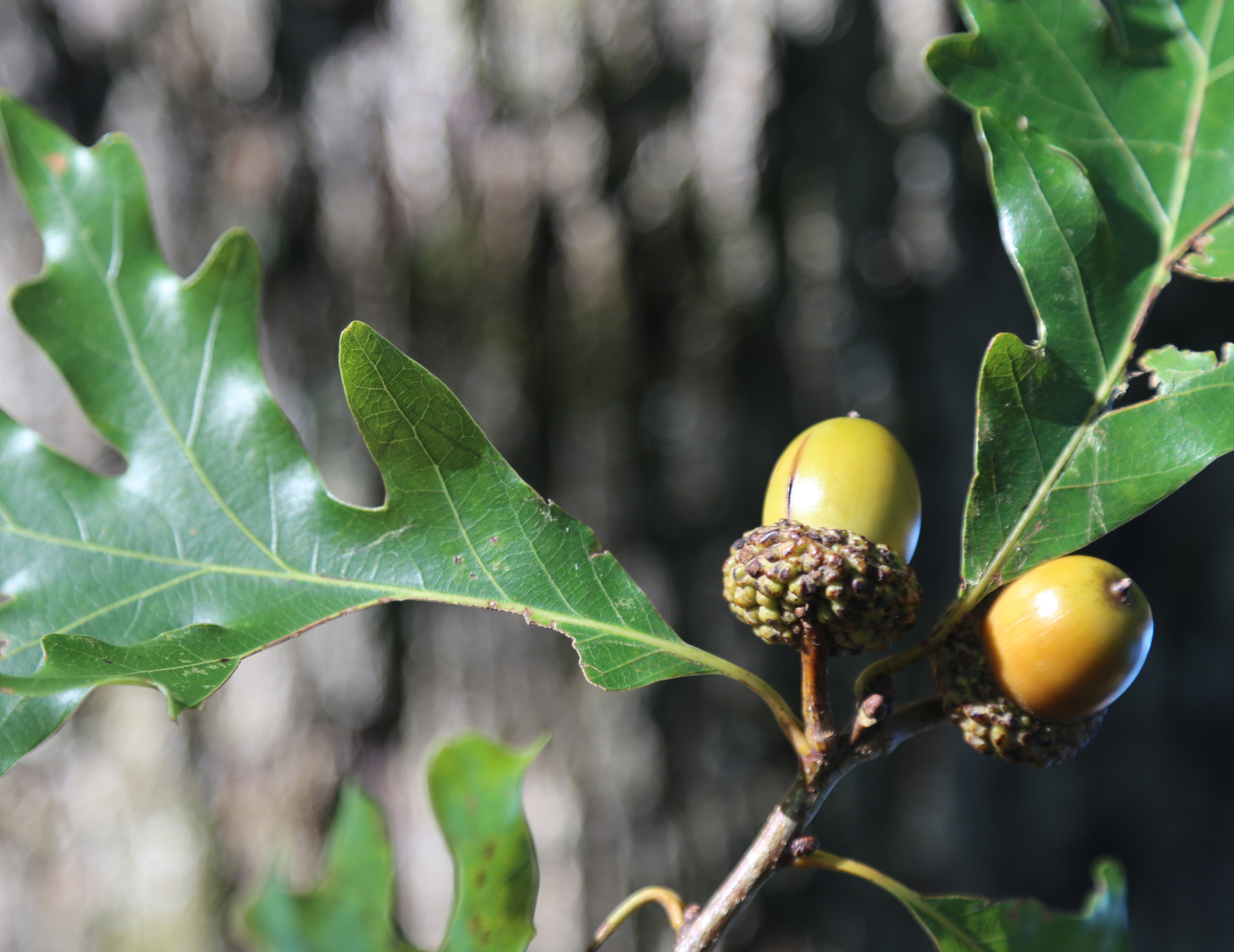
White oak (Quercus alba) acorns. Narango, Tallamy and Shropshire's 2020 study identified oaks as the most productive Lepidoptera host genus across much of North America.

A 2018 study in the Proceedings of the National Academy of Sciences, co-authored with Desirée L. Narango and Peter P. Marra, found that Carolina chickadees in residential yards produced enough young to sustain their populations only where native plants made up at least about 70 percent of the plant biomass. A 2020 paper in Nature Communications by Narango, Tallamy and Shropshire reported that a small number of plant genera, which the authors termed keystone plants, support the majority of local Lepidoptera species, and identified oaks (Quercus) as the most productive host genus across much of North America.

== Native-plant advocacy ==
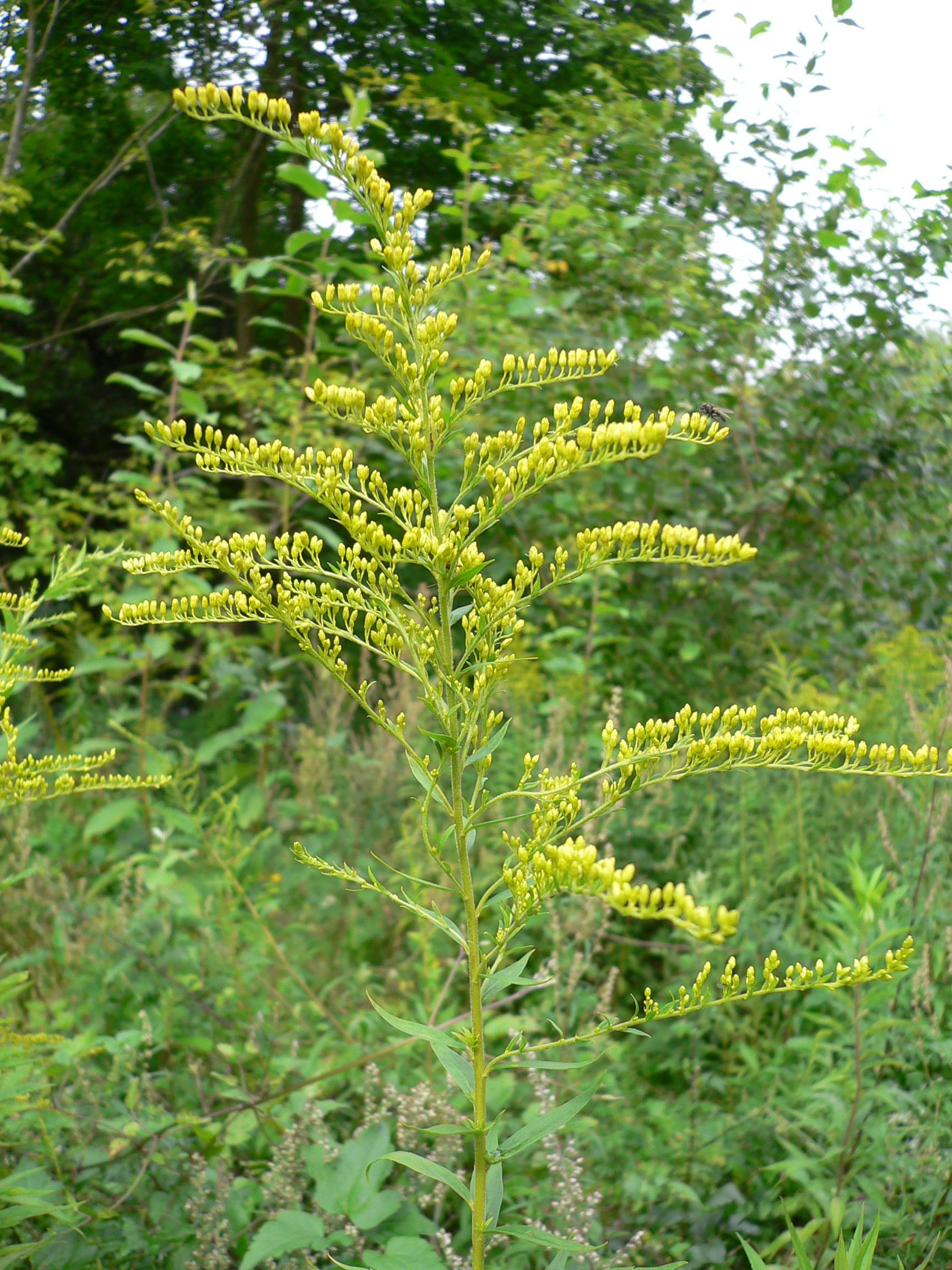
Goldenrod (Solidago), one of the genera Tallamy have identified as a keystone plant supporting native pollinators.

Tallamy advocates home gardens and landscaping designed to provide habitat for native species, bridging the gaps between parks and nature preserves. He has proposed that homeowners halve the area they devote to lawns in the United States—about 40×10^{6} acres (160,000 km^{2}) of turf—and replant the recovered land with locally native species.

== Reception and debate ==
Tallamy's books and lectures have been credited with popularizing native-plant gardening in the United States. Nature's Best Hope (2020) was a New York Times bestseller.

The thesis that non-native plants impoverish local food webs has been debated among ecologists. Reviewing Tallamy's keystone-plants research for Yale Environment 360 in 2020, the University of Connecticut entomologist David Wagner called it "a much needed contribution", while other researchers were more skeptical. The Macalester College ecologist Mark Davis said there was "as yet no evidence that non-native plants reduce insect abundance over the general landscape", and Richard Hobbs of the University of Western Australia said that "the assumption that species cannot adapt to new resources is being increasingly questioned".

In a 2011 commentary in Nature, Davis and 18 co-authors argued that conservationists should "assess organisms on environmental impact rather than on whether they are natives"; a reply defending the distinction between native and non-native species was signed by 141 scientists. Peter Del Tredici of Harvard's Arnold Arboretum has argued that the distinction between native and non-native plants has lost much of its relevance in a globalized world. Studies of butterflies have documented use of introduced plants as hosts: a 2003 survey of the California butterfly fauna by Sherri D. Graves and the lepidopterist Arthur Shapiro found that about a third of the state's native butterfly species had been recorded feeding or breeding on non-native plants.

== Awards and honors ==
- Garden Writers' Association Silver Medal (2008), for Bringing Nature Home
- Garden Club of America Margaret Douglas Medal for Conservation (2013)
- Tom Dodd Jr. Award of Excellence (2013)
- American Horticultural Society B. Y. Morrison Communication Award (2018)
- Cynthia Westcott Scientific Writing Award (2019)

== Bibliography ==
- Tallamy, Douglas W.; Raupp, Michael J., eds. (1991). Phytochemical Induction by Herbivores. New York: Wiley-Interscience. ISBN 978-0-471-63241-2.
- Tallamy, Douglas W. (2007). Bringing Nature Home: How Native Plants Sustain Wildlife in Our Gardens. Timber Press. ISBN 978-0-88192-854-9.
- Darke, Rick; Tallamy, Douglas W. (2014). The Living Landscape: Designing for Beauty and Biodiversity in the Home Garden. Timber Press. ISBN 978-1-60469-408-6.
- Tallamy, Douglas W. (2020). Nature's Best Hope: A New Approach to Conservation that Starts in Your Yard. Timber Press. ISBN 978-1-60469-900-5.
- Tallamy, Douglas W. (2021). The Nature of Oaks: The Rich Ecology of Our Most Essential Native Trees. Timber Press. ISBN 978-1-64326-044-0.
- Tallamy, Douglas W. (2025). How Can I Help?: Saving Nature with Your Yard. Timber Press. ISBN 978-1-64326-471-4.
