= Brood XIII =

Periodical cicada brood

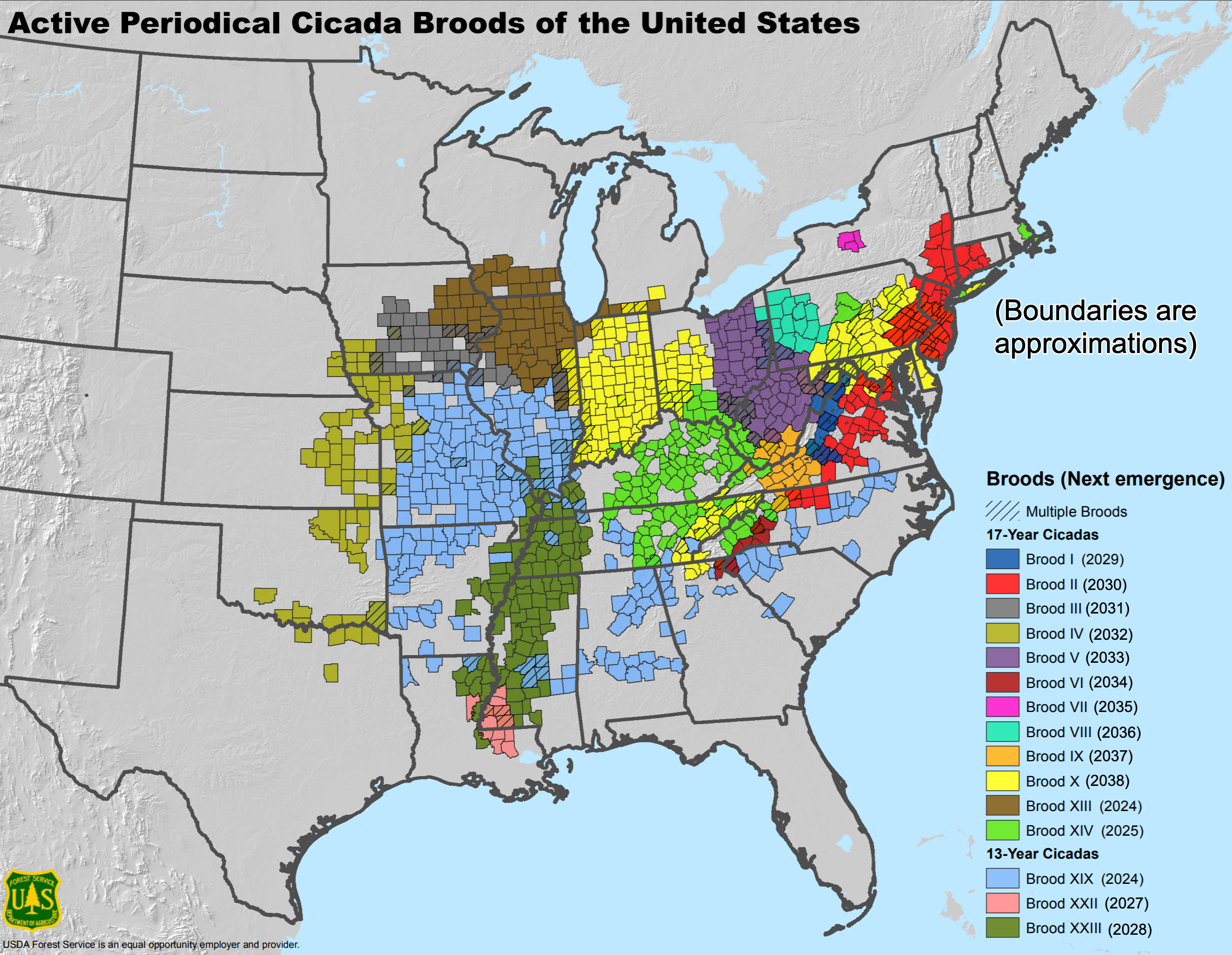
Map of periodic cicada broods with Brood XIII shown in brown

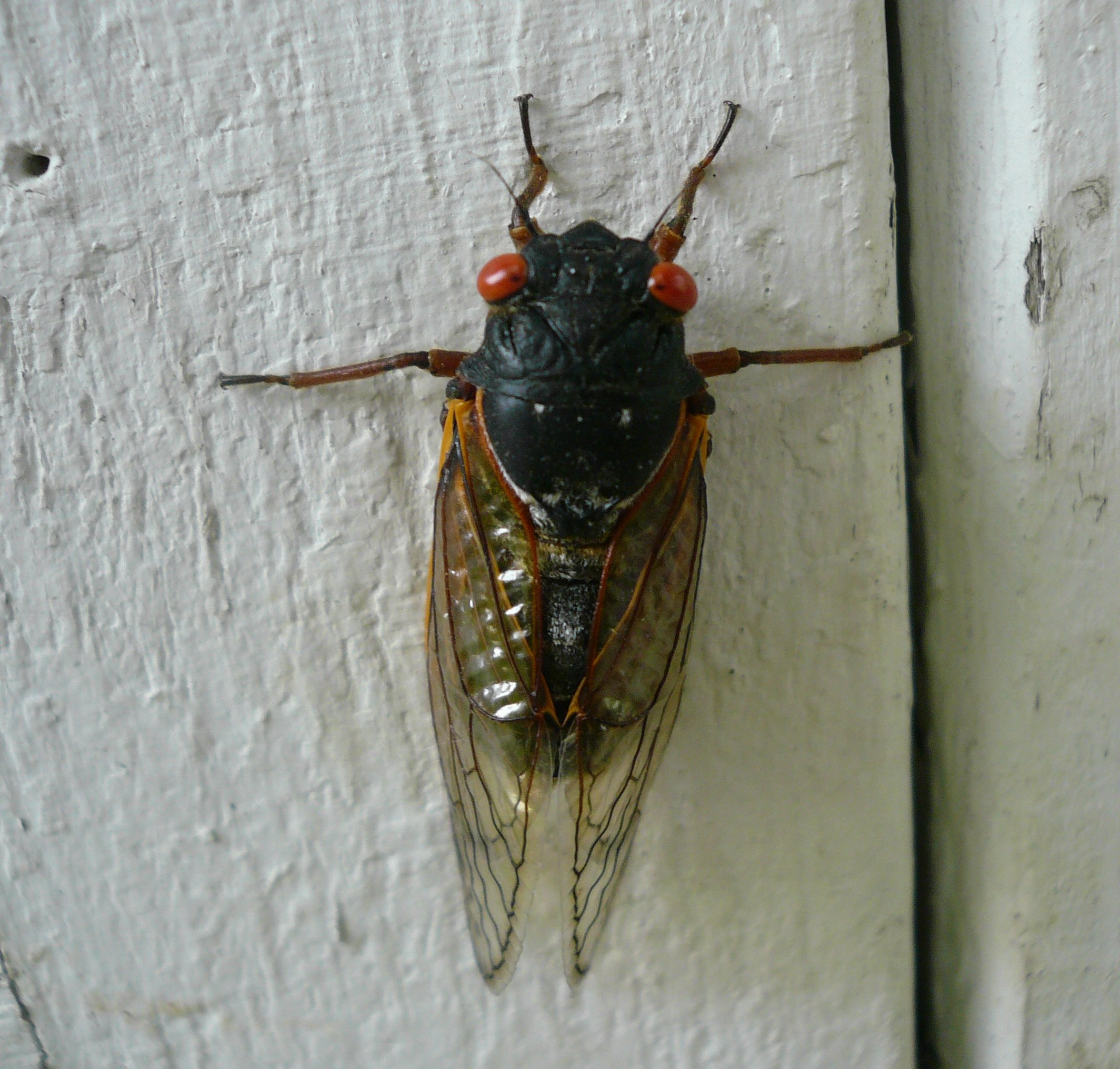
Brood XIII Magicicada

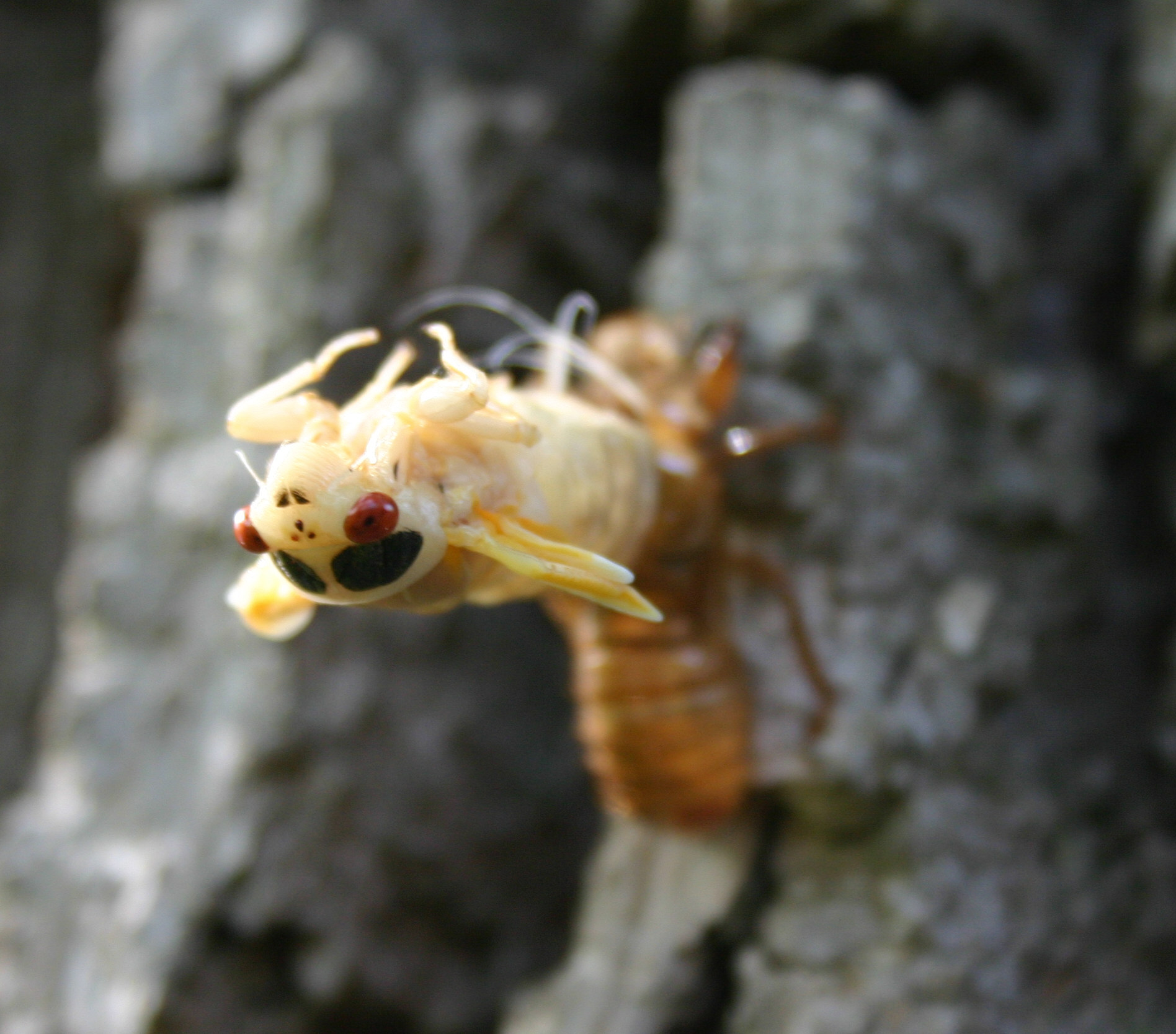
Brood XIII Magicicada molting from its old exoskeleton

Brood XIII (also known as Brood 13 or Northern Illinois Brood) is one of 15 separate broods of periodical cicadas that appear regularly throughout the midwestern United States. Every 17 years, Brood XIII tunnels en masse to the surface of the ground, mates, lays eggs in tree twigs, and then dies off over several weeks.

Entomologist Charles Lester Marlatt published an account in 1907 in which he postulated the existence of 30 broods. The number has since been consolidated, and only 15 broods of periodical cicadas are currently recognized. Of these, twelve (Broods I through X, XIII, and XIV) are 17-year broods and three (Broods XIX, XXII, and XXIII) are 13-year broods. Brood XI is extinct and Brood XII is not currently recognized as a brood of 17-year cicadas.

The 4 cm (1.6 in) long black bugs do not sting or bite. Once they emerge, they spend their two-week lives climbing trees, shedding their exoskeletons and reproducing. Brood XIII can number up to 1.5 million per acre (3.7 million per hectare). The brood is reputed to be the largest emergence of cicadas known anywhere.

The brood's most recent major emergence occurred during the spring and early summer of 2024, throughout an area roughly enclosed by northern Illinois, eastern Iowa, southern Wisconsin, and a narrow strip of Indiana bordering Lake Michigan and Michigan. A premature emergence occurred in 2020. The brood will emerge again in late May 2041.

== Ravinia ==
In the northern Chicago suburb of Highland Park, there was a concern about whether the cicadas's sounds might drown out the music at the Ravinia Festival during May and June, the peak months of cicada activity in 2007. According to the Chicago Tribune, Ravinia adjusted the schedule so that Chicago Symphony Orchestra (CSO) concerts took place in July, after the emergence had ended. Apart from the CSO concerts, all other events took place as scheduled.

== 2020 Sub-Brood ==
Some of the Northern Illinois Sub-Brood (part of Marlatt's XIII) cicadas emerge 4 years early, as they did in the Chicago area during 2020.

== 2024 emergence ==
Brood XIII of the 17-year cicada, which reputably has the largest emergence of cicadas by size known anywhere, and Brood XIX of the 13-year cicada, arguably the largest (by geographic extent) of all periodical cicada broods, were expected to emerge together in 2024 for the first time since 1803. However, the two broods were not expected to overlap except potentially in a thin area in central and eastern Illinois (Macon, Sangamon, Livingston, and Logan counties). Therefore, the density of cicadas in most areas would likely have been the same as usual. The next such dual emergence is expected to occur in 2245, 221 years after 2024.

== Pests and parasites ==
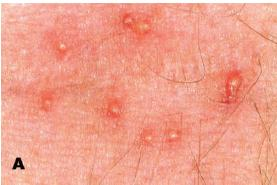
Pyemotes herfsi bites

After the 2007 Brood XIII emergence had ended, many people in Chicago's suburbs reported in early August the development of rashes, pustules, intense itching and other skin conditions on their upper torso, head, neck and arms. Rashes and itching peaked after several days, but lasted as long as two weeks. Anti-itch treatments, including calamine lotion and topical steroid creams, did not relieve the itching.

Edmond Zaborski, a research scientist with the Illinois Natural History Survey, then discovered that the skin conditions had resulted from oak leaf gall mite ("itch mite") (Pyemotes herfsi) bites. Zaborski further found that the mites were ectoparasites whose numbers had increased while feeding on the brood's eggs.

The mites usually feed on oak leaf gall midge (Polystepha pilulae) larvae and other insects, but, as Zaborski found, also parasitize periodical cicada eggs when those are available. Similar events occurred in Cincinnati after a Brood XIV emergence ended in 2008, in Cleveland and elsewhere in northern and eastern Ohio after a Brood V emergence ended in 2016, in the Washington, D.C., area after a Brood X emergence ended in 2021, and again in the Chicago area after the next Brood XIII emergence ended in 2024.

== Gallery ==
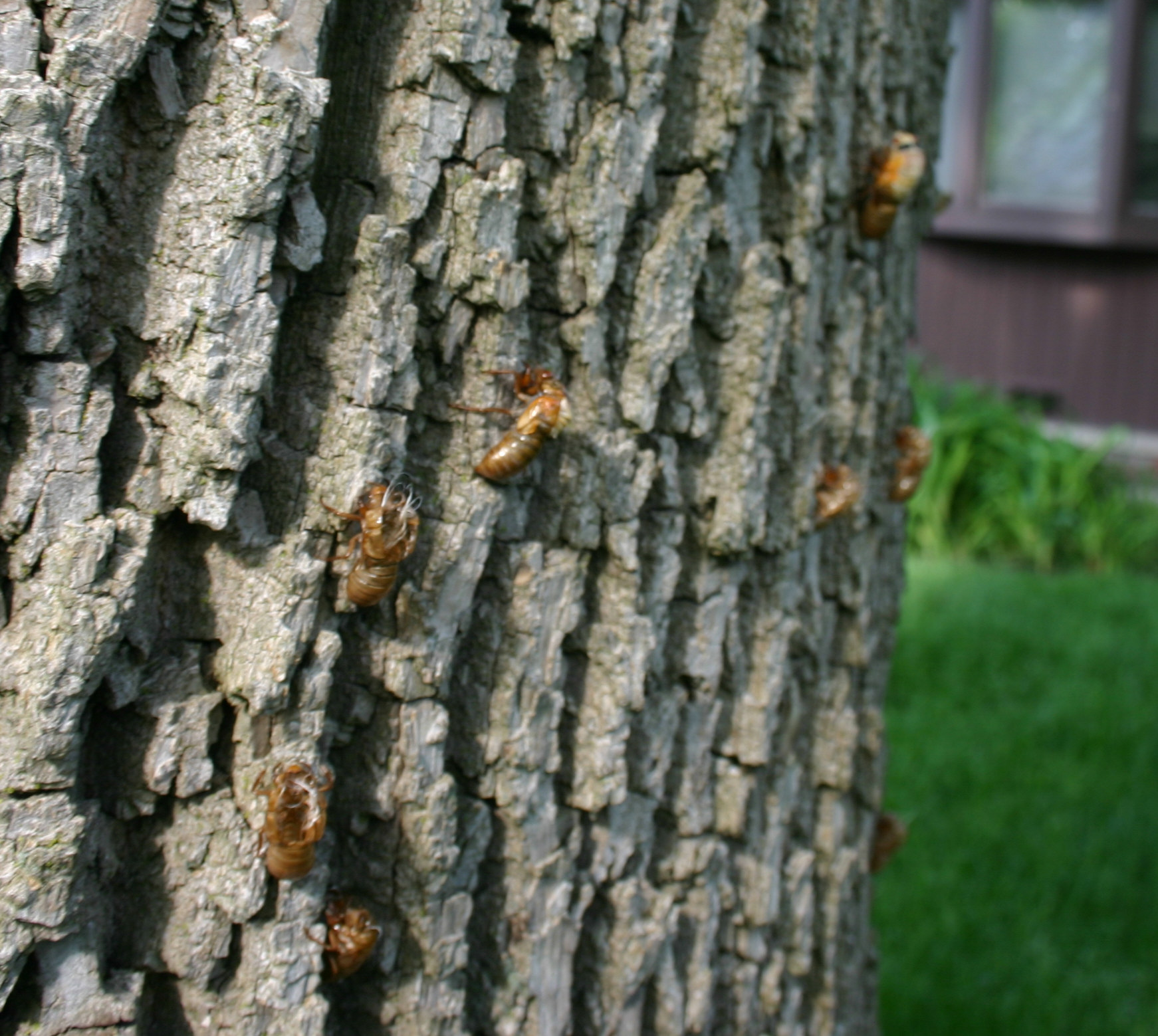
Brood XIII Magicicada in various stages of molting.

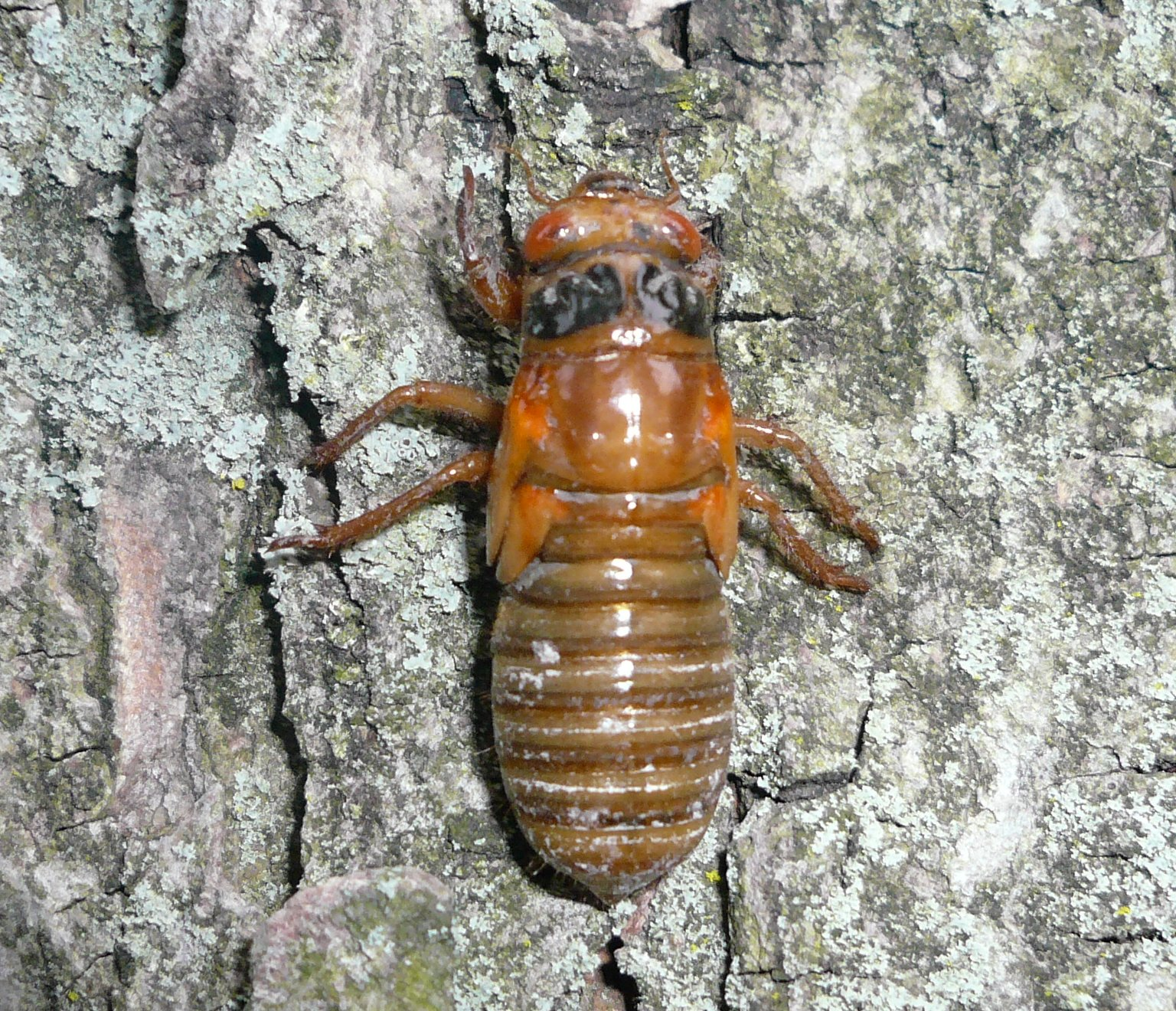
Brood XIII instar

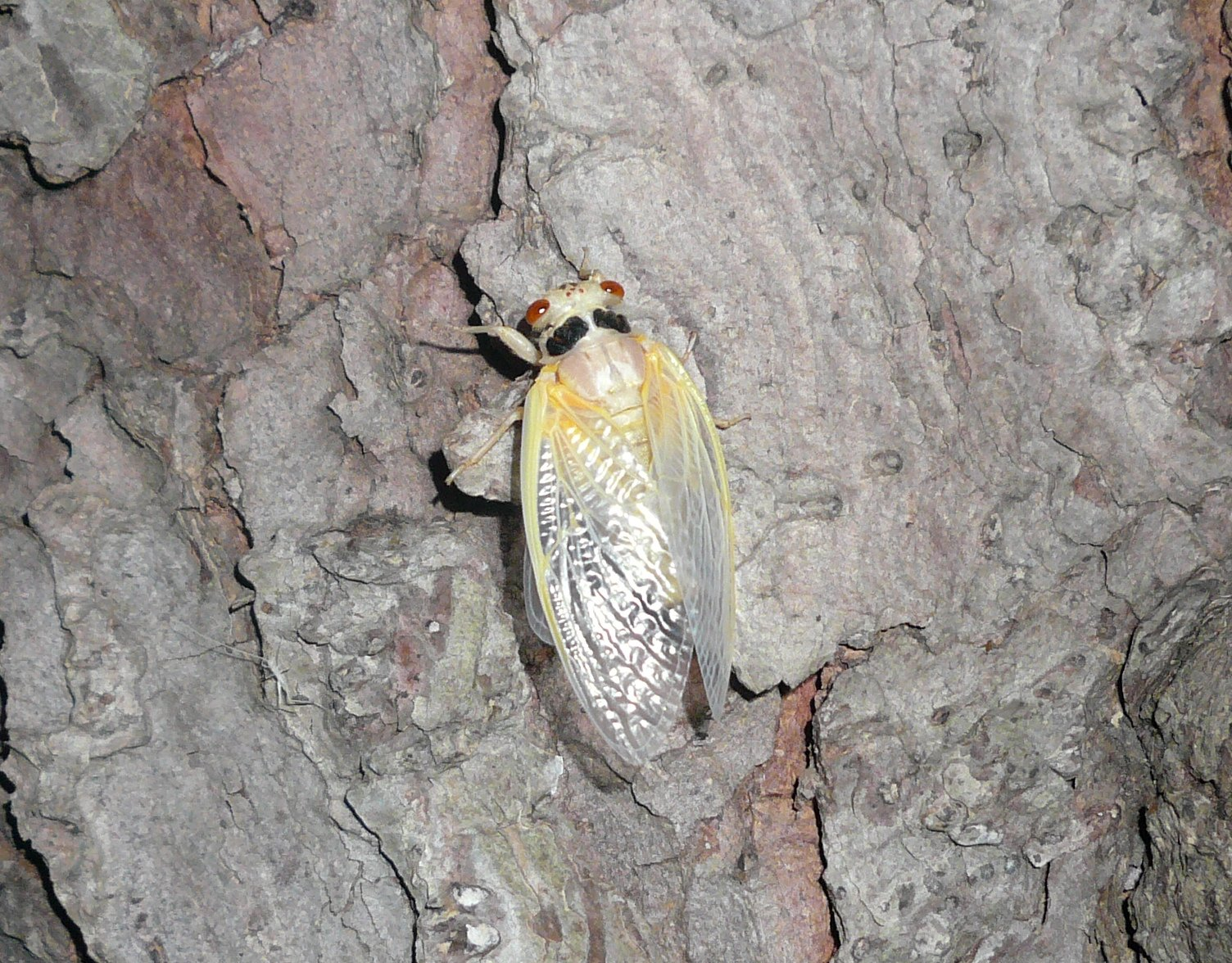
Newly molted Brood XIII

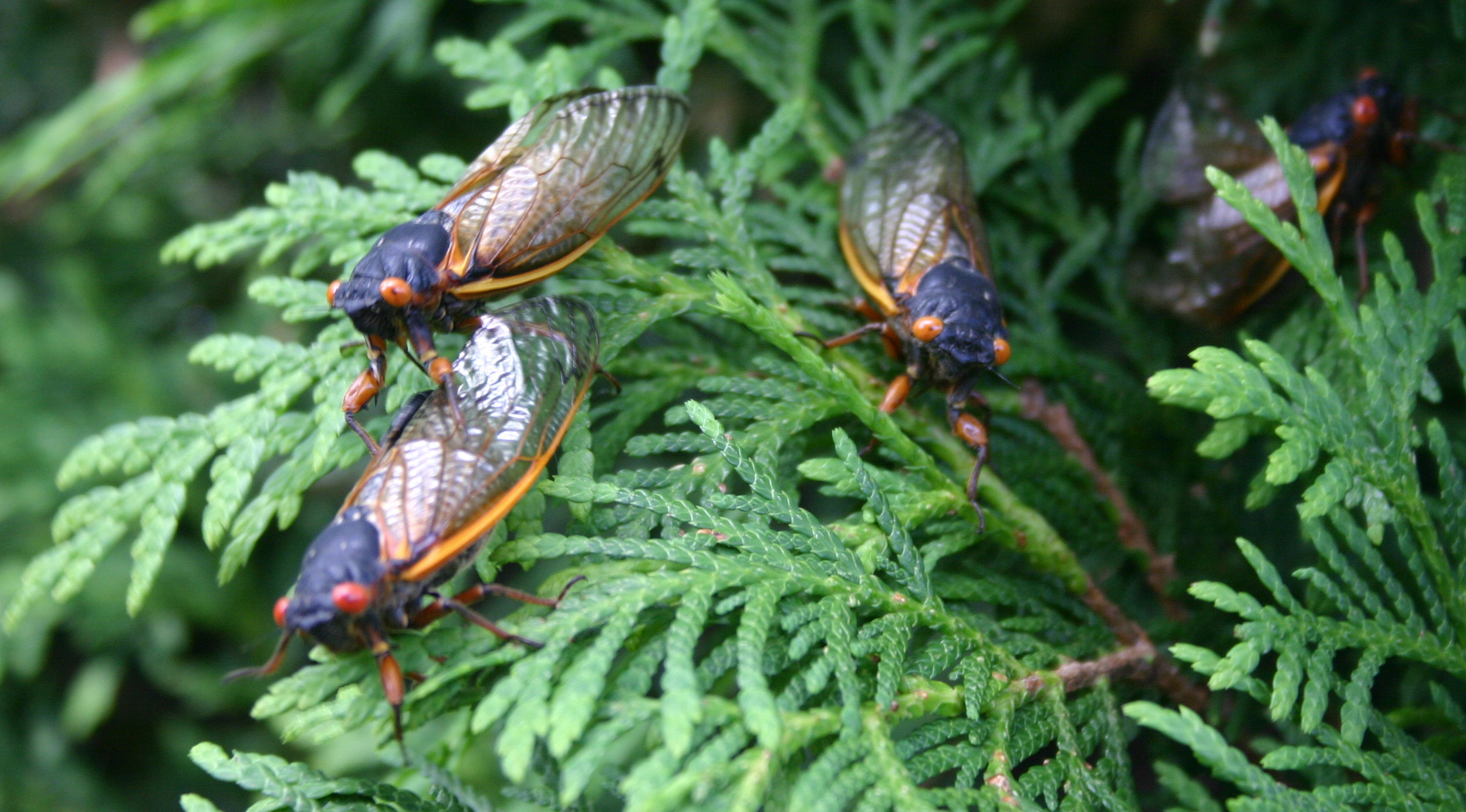
A group of Brood XIII Magicicada on a bush

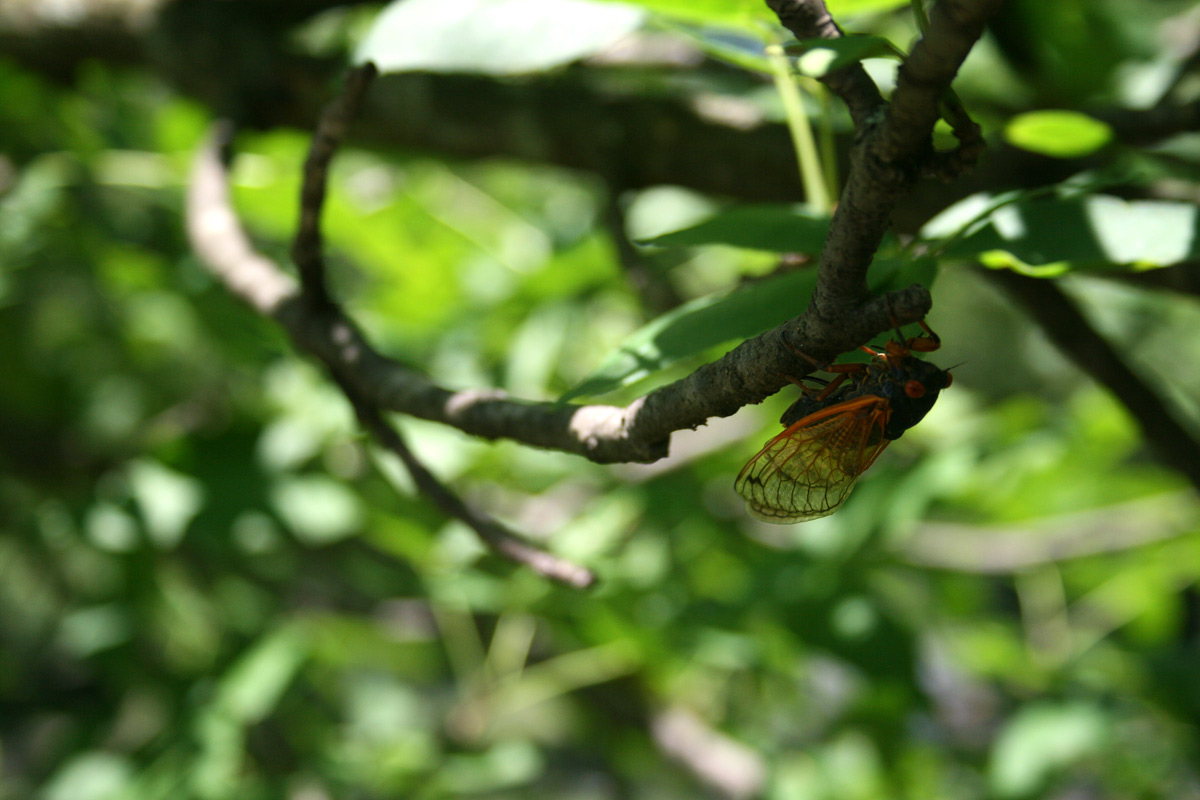
Brood XIII in Westchester, Illinois, on June 21, 2007

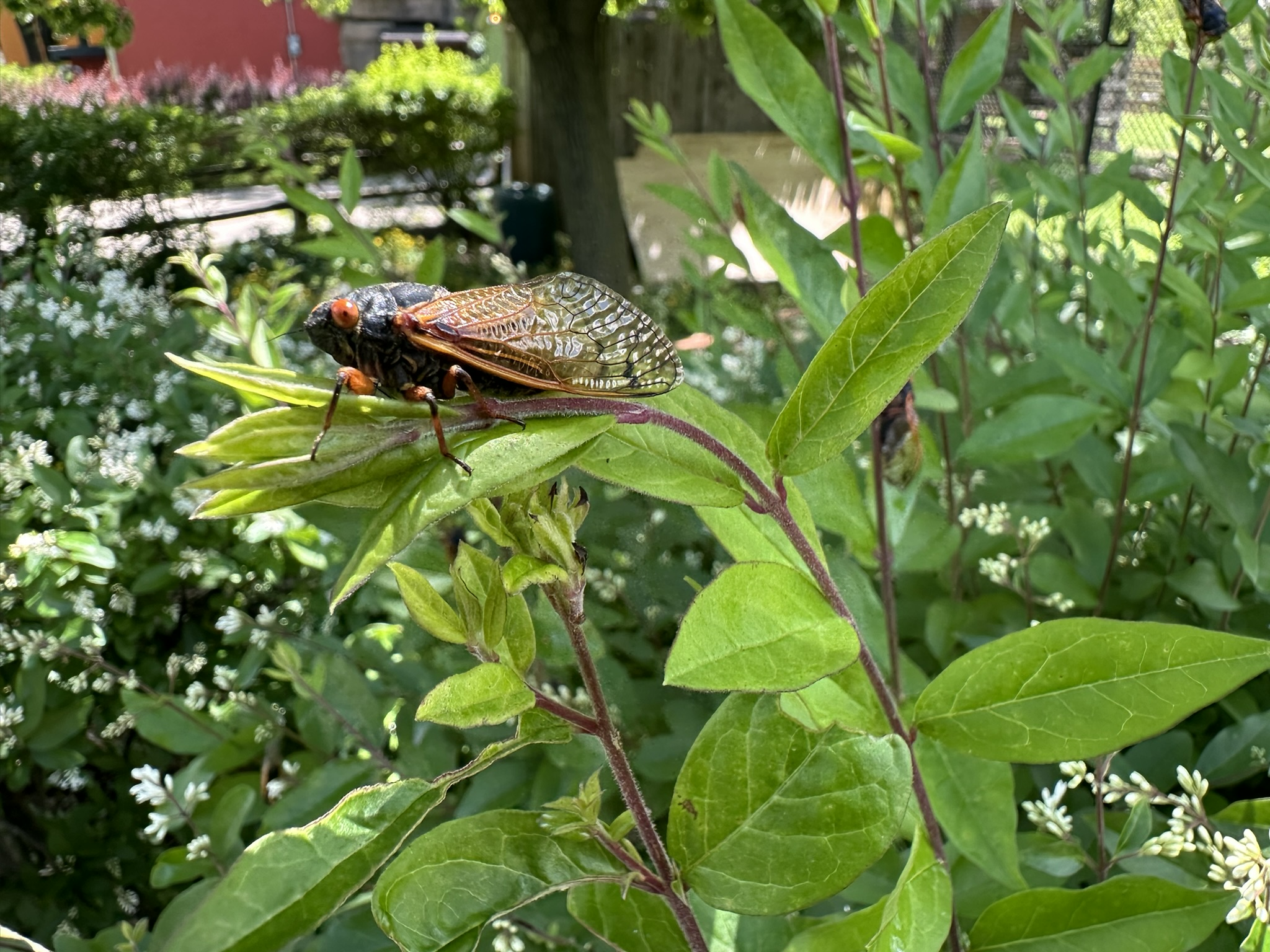
Brood XIII Magicicada at Brookfield Zoo in May 2024

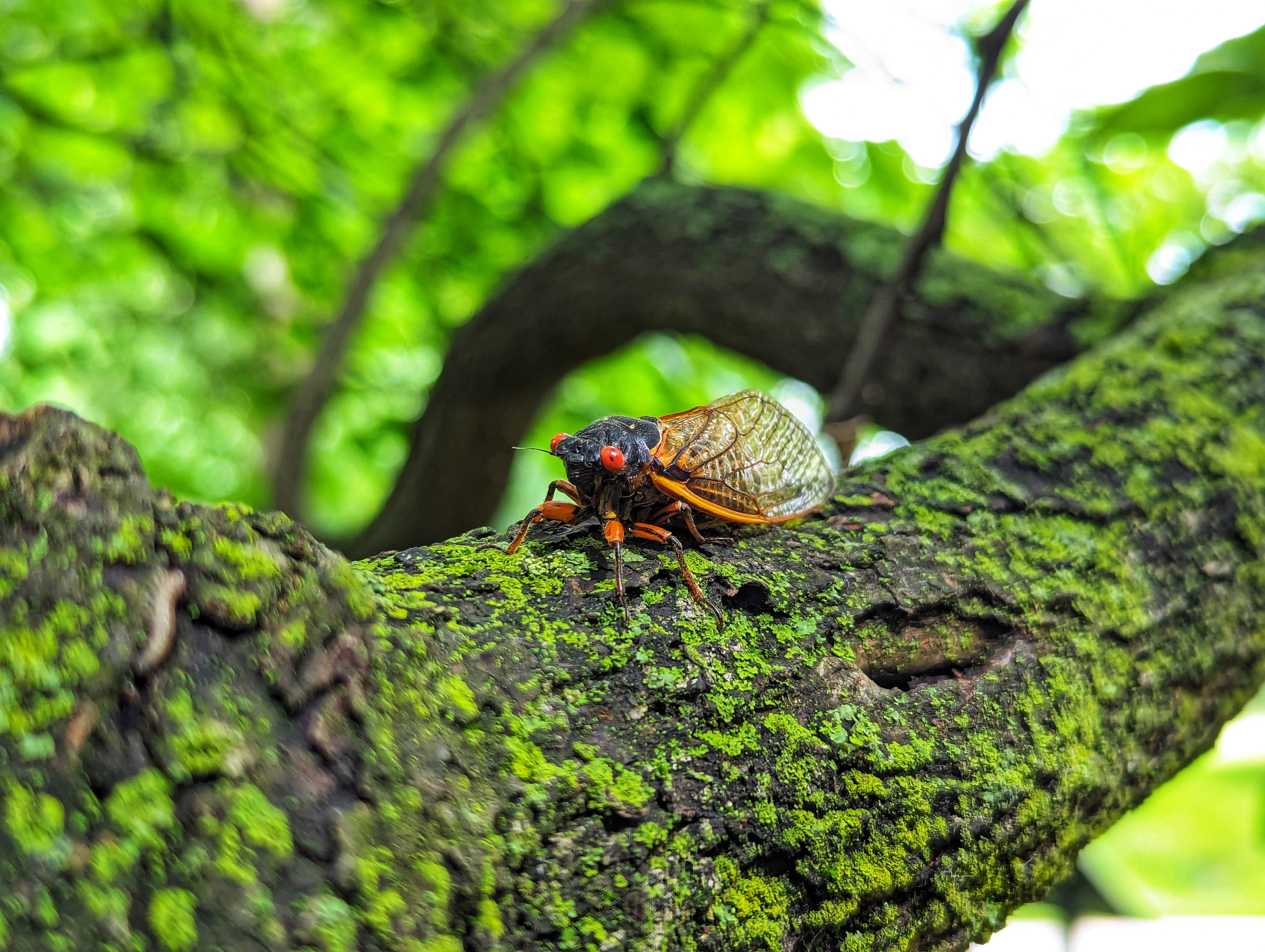
Brood XIII at Springbrook Nature Center, Itasca in June 2024
