= Ethan (given name) =

Male given name

- Pronunciation: /ˈiːθən/
- Gender: Male
- Languages: Hebrew, English, French

Origin
- Languages: Hebrew; English; French
- Meaning: Strong, firm, enduring, impetuous

Other names
- Related names: Eitan, Etan

Ethan or Eytan (Note: pronunciation: /ˈiːθən/ Hebrew: איתן Eytan) is a male given name of Hebrew origin that means "firm, enduring, strong and long-lived". The name Ethan appears eight times in the Hebrew Bible (1 Kings 4:31; 1 Chronicles 2:6, 8; 6:42, 44; 15:17, 19; Psalm 89 superscription).

== Popularity ==
In 2013, it was the fourth most popular name for boys in Australia. Ethan is also popular in the United States and was the 10th most popular boy's name in 2016. According to the US data, 97% of all American boys named Ethan were born after 1989. In 2022, it was the 15th most popular name given to boys in Canada.

== Notable people with the given name "Ethan" include ==
=== A ===
- Ethan Alagich (born 2003), Australian footballer
- Ethan Albright (born 1971), American football player
- Ethan Allen (disambiguation), multiple people
- Ethan Ampadu (born 2000), British footballer
- Ethan Allen Andrews (disambiguation), multiple people
- Ethan Alvano (born 1996), Filipino-American basketball player
- Ethan Anthony (born 1950), American architect
- Ethan Ash, English singer-songwriter
- Eytan Avriel (born 1960), Israeli journalist
- Ethan Azoulay (born 2002), Israeli footballer

=== B ===
- Ethan Bamber (born 1998), English cricketer
- Ethan Bandré (born 1998), American soccer player
- Ethan Bartlow (born 2000), American soccer player
- Ethan Batt (born 1998), New Zealand cyclist
- Ethan Bear (born 1997), Canadian ice hockey player
- Ethan Becker, American knife maker
- Ethan F. Becker, American speech coach
- Ethan Beckford (born 1999), English footballer
- Ethan Belchetz (born 2008), Canadian ice hockey player
- Eytan Ben-David (born 1963), Israeli security expert
- Ethan Berkowitz (born 1962), American politician
- Ethan T. Berlin, American comedian and musician
- Ethan Blackaby (1940–2022), American baseball player
- Ethan Blackadder (born 1995), New Zealand rugby union footballer
- Ethan Bonner (born 1999), American football player
- Ethan Bortnick (born 2000), American pianist
- Ethan Boyes (1978–2023), American cyclist
- Ethan Brierley (born 2003), English footballer
- Ethan Bristow (born 2001), English footballer
- Ethan Britto (born 2000), Gibraltarian footballer
- Ethan Bronner (born 1954), American editor
- Ethan Brookes (born 2001), English cricketer
- Ethan Brooks (born 1972), American football player
- Ethan Brooks (soccer) (born 2001), South African footballer
- Ethan Brosh, Israeli-American guitarist
- Ethan Brown (disambiguation), multiple people
- Ethan Bryant (born 2001), American soccer player
- Ethan Buckler (born 1967), American singer-songwriter
- Ethan Bullemor (born 2000), Australian rugby union footballer
- Ethan Burke (born 2003), American football player
- Ethan Butera (born 2006), Belgian footballer

=== C ===
- Ethan Cairns (born 2004), Scottish footballer
- Ethan Calleja (born 1999), Australian synchronized swimmer
- Ethan Canin (born 1960), American author and physician
- Ethan Carter (disambiguation), multiple people
- Ethan Casey (born 1965), American journalist
- Ethan Casson, American sports executive
- Ethan Cepuran (born 2000), American speed skater
- Ethan Cha, American politician
- Ethan Chislett (born 1998), South African footballer
- Ethan Chorin (born 1968), American scholar
- Ethan Cochran (born 1994), American discus thrower
- Ethan Coen (born 1957), American director and screenwriter
- Ethan Cohen (disambiguation), multiple people
- Ethan Cohn (born 1979), American actor
- Ethan Coleman (born 2000), English footballer
- Ethan Conrad (born 2004), American baseball player
- Ethan Cook, American artist
- Ethan Cooper (born 1995), American football player
- Ethan Cormont (born 2000), French pole vaulter
- Ethan Corson, American politician
- Ethan Couch (born 1997), American convicted murderer
- Ethan Coughlan (born 2002), Irish rugby union footballer
- Ethan Cox (born 1987), Canadian ice hockey player
- Ethan Cutkosky (born 1999), American actor

=== D ===
- Ethan Daniel Davidson (born 1969), American musician
- Ethan de Groot (born 1998), New Zealand rugby player
- Ethan Del Mastro (born 2003), Canadian ice hockey player
- Ethan Dizon (born 2002), American actor
- Ethan Dobbelaere (born 2002), American soccer player
- Ethan Dobbins, Australian rugby union footballer
- Ethan Doherty (born 2001), Irish Gaelic footballer
- Ethan Dolan (born 1999), American comedian
- Ethan Downs (born 2002), American football player
- Ethan Driskell (born 2000), American football player
- Ethan Drogin (born 1976), American television producer
- Ethan D'Souza (born 2006), Emirati cricketer
- Ethan Dube (born 1970), Zimbabwean cricketer
- Ethan Dumortier (born 2000), French rugby union footballer
- Ethan du Preez (born 2003), South African swimmer

=== E ===
- Ethan Ebanks-Landell (born 1992), English professional footballer
- Eytan Elbaz, American entrepreneur
- Ethan Embry (born 1978), American actor
- Ethan Ennis (born 2004), English footballer
- Ethan Erhahon (born 2001), Scottish footballer
- Ethan Erickson (born 1973), American actor
- Ethan Evans (born 2001), American football player
- Ethan Ewing (born 1998), Australian surfer

=== F ===
- Ethan Farmer (born 1975), American bassist
- Ethan Faulkner (born 1990), American basketball coach
- Ethan "Boobie" Feaster (born 2009), American football player
- Ethan Fernea (born 1998), American football player
- Ethan Finlay (born 1990), American soccer player
- Ethan Fisher (born 2001), South African rugby union footballer
- Ethan Fixell (born 1982), American writer
- Eytan Fox (born 1964), Israeli film director
- Ethan Freeman, American actor
- Ethan Freemantle (born 2000), English footballer

=== G ===
- Ethan Gage (born 1991), Canadian soccer player
- Ethan Galbraith (born 2001), Northern Irish footballer
- Ethan Garbers (born 2002), American football player
- Ethan Gilsdorf (born 1966), American writer
- Ethan A. Goldrich (born 1966), American diplomat
- Ethan James Green (born 1990), American photographer
- Ethan Greenidge (born 1997), American football player
- Ethan Allen Greenwood (1779–1856), American lawyer
- Ethan Gross, American television writer
- Ethan Grunkemeyer (born 2005), American football player
- Ethan Gutmann (born 1958), American writer

=== H ===
- Ethan Hamilton (born 1998), Scottish footballer
- Ethan Hammerton (born 2000), British racing driver
- Ethan Hampton (born 2003), American football player
- Ethan Hankins (born 2000), American baseball player
- Ethan Happ (born 1996), American basketball player
- Ethan Hardin (born 2003), American soccer player
- Ethan Harris (disambiguation), multiple people
- Ethan Havard (born 2000), Bulgarian rugby league footballer
- Ethan Hawke (born 1970), American actor
- Ethan Hayter (born 1998), English racing cyclist
- Ethan Hemer (born 1991), American football player
- Ethan Higbee, American filmmaker
- Ethan Hill (born 2002), English footballer
- Ethan Hitchcock (disambiguation), multiple people
- Ethan Holliday (born 2007), American baseball player
- Ethan Hooker (born 2003), South African rugby union footballer
- Ethan Horton (born 1962), American football player
- Ethan Horvath (born 1995), American soccer player
- Ethan Hughes (born 1994), Australian rules footballer
- Ethan Hurkett (born 2001), American football player
- Ethan Hurley (born 2003), Irish hurler
- Ethan Hussey (born 2003), English runner

=== I ===
- Ethan Ingram (born 2003), English footballer
- Ethan Iverson (born 1973), American pianist and composer

=== J ===
- Ethan James (disambiguation), multiple people
- Ethan Johns (born 1969), English record producer
- Ethan Johnston (born 2002), English footballer
- Ethan Jones (footballer) (born 1998), English footballer
- Ethan Jolley (born 1997), Gibraltarian footballer
- Ethan Juan (born 1982), Taiwanese actor

=== K ===
- Ethan Kachosa (born 2003), English footballer
- Ethan Kaplan, American economics professor
- Ethan Kath (born 1977), Canadian songwriter and producer
- Ethan Katz (born 1983), American baseball coach
- Ethan B. Katz (born 1979), American writer
- Ethan Katzberg, Canadian hammer thrower
- Ethan Kelley (born 1980), American football player
- Ethan Kenning (born 1943), American singer-songwriter
- Ethan Kilmer (born 1983), American football player
- Ethan Klein (born 1985), American YouTuber
- Ethan Kleinberg, American professor
- Ethan Kohler (born 2005), American soccer player
- Ethan Kross, American psychologist
- Ethan Kutler (born 1995), American soccer player

=== L ===
- Ethan Laidlaw (1899–1963), American film actor
- Ethan Laidlaw (footballer) (born 2005), Scottish footballer
- Ethan Laird (born 2001), English footballer
- Ethan Lawrence (born 1992), English actor
- Ethan Josh Lee (born 2001), Korean-American actor
- Ethan Leib (born 1975), American law professor
- Ethan Lewis (born 1994), Welsh rugby union player
- Ethan G. Lewis, American economics professor
- Ethan Lindenberger (born 2001), American vaccine activist
- Ethan Lloyd (born 2001), Welsh rugby union footballer
- Ethan Loch (born 2004), Scottish pianist
- Ethan Lowe (born 1991), Australian rugby union player
- Ethan Luck (born 1978), American musician and producer

=== M ===
- Ethan Maniquis, American film editor
- Ethan Manning, American politician
- Ethan Martin (born 1989), American baseball player
- Ethan Mbappé (born 2006), French footballer
- Ethan McGuinness (born 2001), Australian athlete
- Ethan McIlroy (born 2000), Irish rugby union footballer
- Ethan McLeod (2004–2025), English footballer
- Ethan McSweeny, American theatre director
- Ethan Meichtry (born 2005), Swiss footballer
- Ethan B. Minier (1874–1958), American politician
- Ethan Minsker (born 1969), American writer
- Eytan Mirsky (born 1961), American singer-songwriter
- Ethan Mitchell (born 1991), New Zealand track cyclist
- Eytan Modiano, American professor
- Ethan Mordden (born 1947), American author and researcher
- Ethan Moreau (born 1975), Canadian ice hockey player

=== N ===
- Ethan Nadelmann (born 1957), American activist
- Ethan Nascimento (born 2007), American stock car racing driver
- Ethan Natoli (born 1995), Italian-Australian rugby league footballer
- Ethan Nelson-Roberts (born 2000), English footballer
- Ethan Nichtern (born 1978), American Buddhist teacher
- Ethan Nicolle, American comic book creator
- Ethan Nordean, American political activist
- Ethan Nwaneri (born 2007), English footballer

=== O ===
- Ethan O'Connor (born 1991), American lacrosse player
- Ethan O'Donnell (born 1997), Irish Gaelic footballer
- Ethan Ogrodniczuk (born 2001), Canadian cyclist
- Ethan Olivier (born 2005), New Zealand track athlete
- Ethan Onianwa (born 2003), American football player
- Ethan O'Reilly (born 1985), South African cricketer
- Ethan Orr, American politician

=== P ===
- Ethan Page (born 1989), Canadian professional wrestler
- Ethan Panizza, Australian television actor
- Ethan Paquin, American poet
- Ethan Parry (born 1999), Australian rugby union footballer
- Ethan Payne (born 1995), English YouTuber
- Ethan Peck (born 1986), American actor
- Ethan Pecko (born 2002), American baseball player
- Ethan Persoff (born 1974), American cartoonist
- Eytan Pessen (born 1961), Israeli pianist
- Ethan Peters (2003–2020), American beauty blogger
- Ethan Phillips (born 1955), American actor
- Ethan Phillips (footballer) (born 1999), Australian rules footballer
- Ethan Pinnock (born 1992), English footballer
- Ethan Place, American soldier
- Ethan Pocic (born 1995), American football player
- Ethan Pringle (born 1986), American rock climber
- Ethan Prow (born 1992), American ice hockey player
- Ethan Pulliam (born 2004), American football player
- Ethan Pye (born 2002), English footballer

=== Q ===
- Ethan Quai-Ward (born 1999), Australian rugby league footballer
- Ethan Quinn (born 2004), American tennis player

=== R ===
- Ethan Rains (born 1981), Iranian-American actor
- Ethan Randall (born 1978), American actor
- Ethan Read (born 2005), Australian rules footballer
- Ethan Ringel (born 1994), American racing driver
- Ethan Roberts (born 1997), American baseball player
- Ethan Robson (born 1996), English footballer
- Eytan Rockaway, American film director
- Ethan Roots (born 1997), New Zealand rugby union player
- Ethan Ross (disambiguation), multiple people
- Ethan Rubinstein (1941–2015), Israeli-Canadian doctor
- Ethan Ruby, American businessman
- Ethan Rusbatch (born 1992), New Zealand basketball player
- Ethan Russell (born 1945), American photographer
- Ethan Ryan (born 1996), Irish rugby union player

=== S ===
- Ethan Sanders (born 2005), Australian rugby league footballer
- Ethan Sandler (born 1972), American actor and film producer
- Ethan Santos (born 1998), Gibraltarian footballer
- Eytan Schwartz, Israeli-American public relations expert
- Ethan H. Shagan (born 1971), American historian
- Ethan A. H. Shepley (1896–1975), American academic administrator
- Ethan M. Shevach (born 1943), American immunologist
- Ethan Siegel (born 1978), American theoretical astrophysicist
- Ethan Slater (born 1992), American actor
- Ethan Small (born 1997), American baseball player
- Ethan Smith (disambiguation), multiple people
- Ethan Spaulding, American animator and director
- Ethan Stanley (born 2003), Australian rules footballer
- Eytan Stibbe (born 1958), Israeli pilot
- Ethan Stiefel (born 1973), American ballet dancer
- Ethan Stowell, American chef
- Ethan Strange (born 2004), Australian rugby league footballer
- Ethan Strimling (born 1967), American corporate executive
- Ethan Stroud (1788–1846), American trader
- Ethan Suplee (born 1976), American actor
- Ethan Sutcliffe (born 2004), English footballer

=== T ===
- Ethan Tapper, American forester and author
- Ethan Thompson (born 1999), Puerto Rican basketball player
- Ethan Tobman (born 1979), Canadian film production designer
- Ethan Tracy (born 1989), American professional golfer
- Ethan Tucker, American rabbi
- Ethan Tufts (born 1976), American songwriter
- Ethan Twomey (born 2002), Irish hurler

=== V ===
- Ethan Vanacore-Decker (born 1994), American soccer player
- Ethan Van der Ryn (born 1962), American sound editor
- Ethan van Leeuwen (born 2001), English badminton player
- Ethan Van Sciver (born 1974), American comic book artist
- Ethan Vasko, American football player
- Ethan Vernon (born 2000), British cyclist
- Ethan Vishniac (born 1955), American astrophysicist
- Ethan Vogt (born 1974), American filmmaker

=== W ===
- Ethan Waddleton (born 1996), English rugby union footballer
- Ethan Walker (born 2002), English footballer
- Ethan Waller (born 1992), English rugby union player
- Ethan Warren (born 1991), Australian diver
- Ethan Watters (born 1964), American journalist
- Ethan Watts (born 1972), American volleyball player
- Ethan Wayne (born 1962), American actor
- Ethan Werek (born 1991), Canadian ice hockey player
- Ethan Wesloski (born 2003), American football player
- Ethan Westbrooks (born 1990), American football player
- Ethan Wheatley (born 2006), English footballer
- Ethan White (born 1991), American soccer player
- Ethan Wiley, American record producer
- Ethan Wilson (born 1999), American baseball player
- Ethan Wolf (born 1995), American football player
- Ethan Wragge (born 1990), American basketball player
- Ethan Wyttenbach (born 2007), American ice hockey player

=== Y ===
- Ethan Young (born 2004), English footballer

=== Z ===
- Ethan Zohn (born 1973), American motivational speaker
- Ethan Zubak (born 1998), American soccer player
- Ethan Zuckerman (born 1973), American businessman

== Notable fictional characters ==
- Ethan Clade, a character in the film Strange World
- Ethan Edwards, a character in the comic book series Marvel Comics
- Ethan Frome, the main character in the novel of the same name
- Ethan Hardy, a character on the drama series Casualty
- Ethan Hunt, a character in the film series Mission: Impossible
- Ethan James, a character in the television series Power Rangers Dino Thunder
- Ethan Lovett, a character on the soap opera General Hospital
- Ethan Rom, a character on the television series Lost
- Ethan Winters, a character in the video game series Resident Evil
- Ethan Winthrop, a character on the drama series Passions
- Ethan Zobelle, a character on the television series Sons of Anarchy

== See also ==
- Ethan (biblical figure)
