= Modiano (disambiguation) =

Patrick Modiano (born 1945) is a French novelist, recipient of the Nobel Prize in Literature.

Modiano may also refer to:

- Modiano (company), Italian manufacturer of cigarette papers and playing cards

== People with the surname ==
- Eli Modiano (1881-1968), Italian-Jewish architect in Thessaloniki, Greece
  - Modiano Market, an enclosed market in Thessaloniki, Greece
  - Villa Modiano, today the Folklife and Ethnological Museum of Macedonia and Thrace
- Eytan Modiano, American engineer
- Guido Modiano (1899-1943), Italian typographer and art critic
- Henri Modiano (1932-2020), French politician, son of Vidal
- Joseph Modiano, 19th-century Ottoman industrialist, namesake of Villa Joseph Modiano in Thessaloniki, Greece
- M. Modiano, creator of Modiano's model of English, a model of international use of English
- Marcello Modiano (1914-1993), Italian entrepreneur and politician
- Marie Modiano (born 1978), French singer and writer, daughter of Patrick
- Natty (British singer) (born Alexander Modiano in 1983), British reggae artist
- Samuel a.k.a. Sami Modiano (born 1930), Italian deportee and Holocaust witness
- Sandra Modiano (born 1959), Swiss writer and educator
- Sara Modiano (1951–2010), Colombian artist
- Umberto Modiano, Brazilian businessman who financially supported the 1989 emancipation movement of Armação dos Búzios
  - Umberto Modiano Airport, in Armação dos Búzios, Brazil
- Vidal Modiano, (1888–1971), president of the Conseil Représentatif des Institutions juives de France, father of Henri
- Zina Modiano (born 1974), French film director, daughter of Patrick

== See also ==
- Modigliani (disambiguation)
