= Ethan =

Ethan may refer to:

== People ==
- Ethan (given name)
- Ethan (biblical figure)

== Places ==
- Ethan, South Dakota
- Fort Ethan Allen (Arlington, Virginia)

== Fiction ==
- Ethan of Athos, 1986 novel by Lois McMaster Bujold
- "Ethan Brand", 1850 short story by Nathaniel Hawthorne
- Ethan Frome, 1911 novel by Edith Wharton

== See also ==
- Eitan (disambiguation)
- Etan (disambiguation)
- Ethen
- Ethan Allen (disambiguation)
- Ethane
