= Ethen =

Ethen is a unisex given name and a variation of the name Ethan, which means 'strong, enduring, firm, long-lived'. Notable people with the name include:

- Ethen Beavers, American comic book artist
- Ethen Roberts (born 1990), American professional freeride mountain bike and FMX rider
- Ethen Sampson (born 1993), South African soccer player

== See also ==
- Etan (disambiguation)
- Eitan (disambiguation)
