= João Kabeção =

Brazilian skateboarder (1973–2020)

João Maurício (Rio de Janeiro, 1973 – Armação dos Búzios, 5 May 2020), known as João Kabeção, was a Brazilian skateboarder.

== Career ==
In the 1980s and early 1990s, Kabeção was among the most famous skateboarders in Brazil, mainly known for his sessions at the Urquinha mini-track, in the South Zone of Rio de Janeiro.

In 1989, he won a stage of the professional Brazilian Skate Circuit as an amateur skateboarder, being the first to achieve this feat. The victory in this event earned him the cover of the magazine SKT News, the opportunity to launch a pro-model and the invitation to participate in the 1990 Itaú Skate Cup, an event on the beach of Ipanema that featured the participation of Mark Gonzales among its highlights.

Shortly thereafter, however, he stopped skating and retired from the public scene. He lived the last years of his life in the city of Búzios, where he worked as a teacher of jiu-jitsu.

== Death ==
Kabeção died on 5 May 2020, aged 47, of COVID-19, during the pandemic in Brazil.
