= Lindenberger =

Lindenberger is a surname. Notable people with the surname include:

- Alfred Lindenberger (1897–1973), German pilot
- Ethan Lindenberger (born 2000), American activist
- Klaus Lindenberger (born 1957), Austrian football player
