= Ethan (biblical figure) =

Biblical character

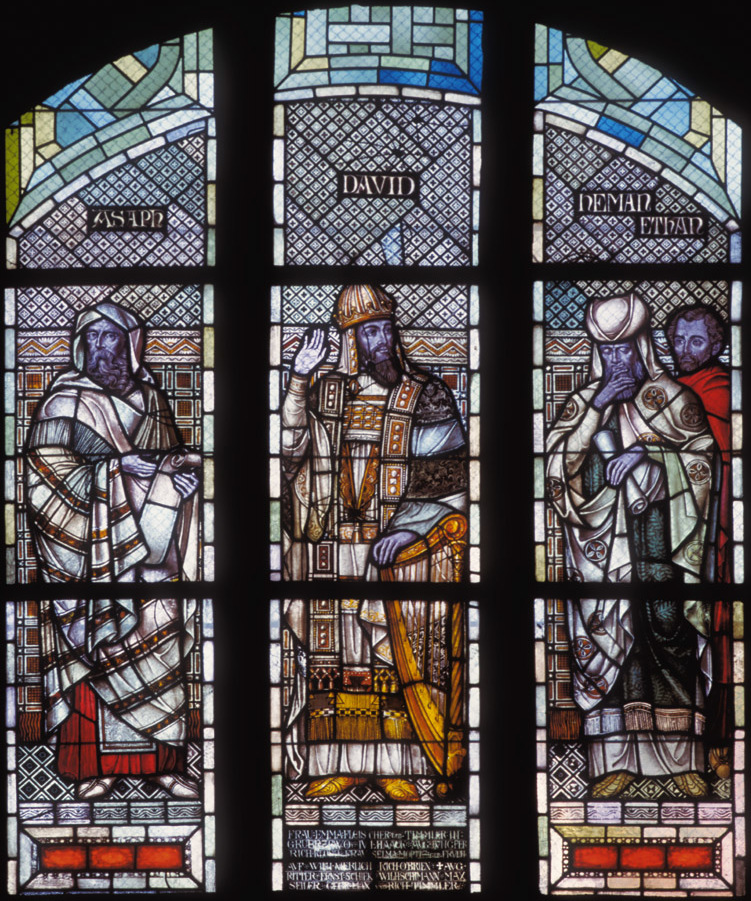
Ethan (far right, in red robe), depicted in the Saint Mary Lutheran Church in Legnica

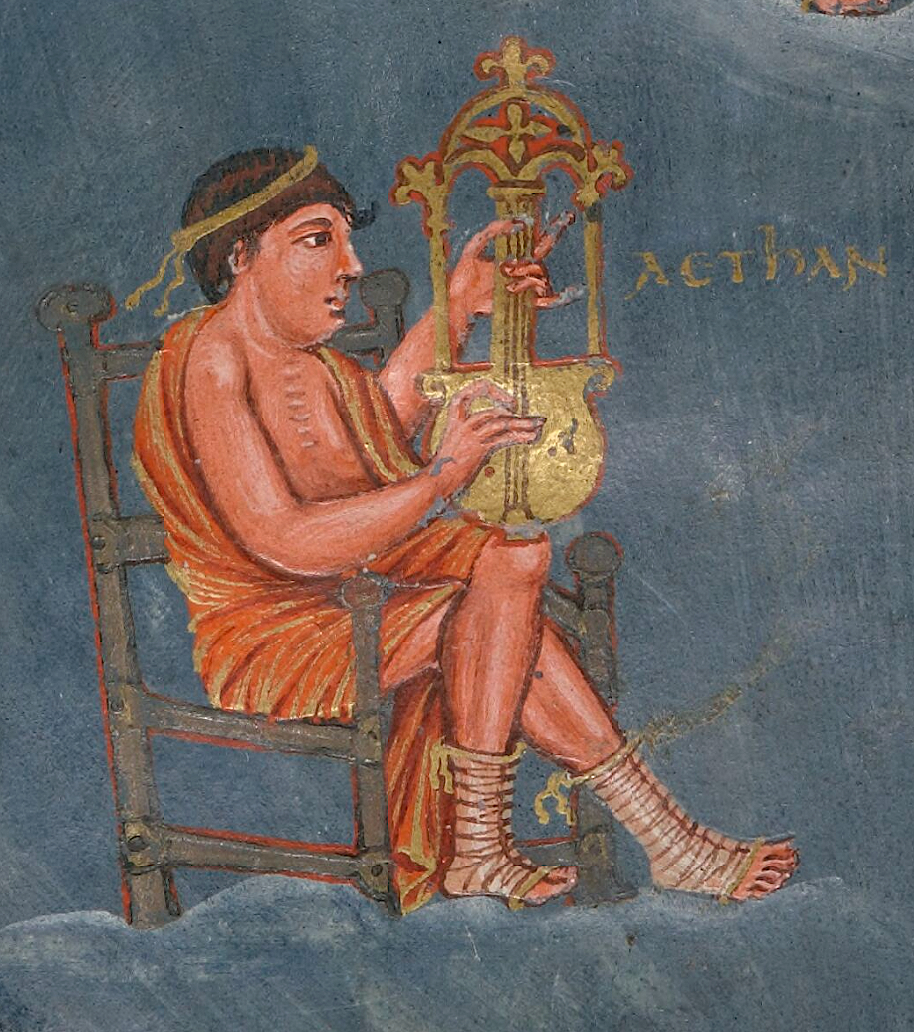
Aethan or Ethan, from the Vivian Bible, circa 845 A.D., Carolingian Empire.

Ethan (Hebrew: אֵיתָן, Modern: ʾĒtan, Tiberian: ʾĒṯān, Eytan or Eitan) the Ezrahite, is mentioned in the Hebrew Bible. Ethan was a boy at King David's court well known for his wisdom. He authored Psalms 89: this Psalm is entitled "a maschil or contemplation of Ethan the Ezrahite". Baptist preacher Charles Spurgeon theorised that this was the same person as Jeduthun. Theologian John Gill refers to a Jewish tradition which identifies Ethan with Abraham; Heman with Moses; and Chalcol with Joseph.

Ethan means "strong and optimistic, solid and enduring, permanent". The name Ethan appears eight times in the Hebrew Bible (1 Kings 4:31, Psalm. 89 title, 1 Chronicles. 2:6 and 2:8, 1 Chronicles. 6:42 and 6:44, and 1 Chronicles. 15:17 and 15:19).

He was a standard of wisdom to whom King Solomon is compared favorably. Called there "Ethan the Ezrahite", to whom the title of Psalm 89 ascribes the authorship of that poem.

A son of Kishi or Kishaiah, of the Merarite branch of Levites, and also, with Heman and Asaph, was placed by King David over the service of song (1 Chronicles 6:44; 1 Chronicles 15:17, 19).

An ancestor of Asaph of the Gershonite branch of the Levites (1 Chronicles 6:42).

== In literature ==
Ethan is the protagonist and narrator of Stefan Heym's 1973 historical novel The King David Report. As depicted by Heym, Ethan is commissioned by the newly enthroned King Solomon to write an official history of his father, King David. Ethan meets and interviews many persons who were associated with David at various periods of the late King's life. However, much of the material gathered by Ethan gets censored out for political reasons by Solomon and his ministers; the royally-approved surviving portions of Ethan's report eventually get into the Bible, forming the later chapters of the Books of Samuel and the early ones of the Books of Kings. Heym clearly used the biblical setting as a metaphor for his own situation as a writer in East Germany's Communist regime.

== See also ==
- Eitan (disambiguation)
- Etan (disambiguation)
- Ethan (disambiguation)
- Heman the Ezrahite
- Psalm 89
