= Kerrang! =

British rock, punk and heavy metal music magazine

- Cover of 12 April 2023 digital issue of Kerrang! featuring American heavy metal band Metallica
- Editor: Luke Morton
- Staff writers: Nick Ruskell, David McLaughlin, Emily Carter, Tom Shepherd, Ethan Fixell, Christopher Krovatin, Cat Jones
- Frequency: Monthly (1981–1982); Fortnightly (1982–1987); Weekly (1987–2020); Quarterly (2021–present)
- Publisher: Wasted Talent Ltd
- Founder: Alan Lewis
- First issue: 6 June 1981
- Country: United Kingdom
- Based in: London
- Language: English
- Website: kerrang.com
- ISSN: 0262-6624
- OCLC: 32328241

Kerrang! is a British music webzine and quarterly magazine that primarily covers rock, punk and heavy metal music. Since 2017, the magazine has been published by Wasted Talent Ltd (the same company that owns electronic music publication Mixmag). The magazine was named onomatopoeically after the sound of a "guitar being struck with force".

Kerrang! was first published on 6 June 1981 as a one-off "Heavy Metal Special" from the now-defunct Sounds newspaper. Due to the popularity of the issue, the magazine became a monthly publication, before transitioning into a weekly in 1987. Initially devoted to the new wave of British heavy metal and the rise of hard rock acts, Kerrang!'s musical emphasis has changed several times, focusing on grunge, nu metal, post-hardcore, emo and other alternative rock and metal genres over the course of its forty-year publication history. In 2001, it became the best-selling British music weekly, overtaking NME.

After publishing a total of 1,818 issues, Kerrang! ceased publication of their weekly magazine in March 2020 amid the COVID-19 pandemic, while continuing as an online publication featuring digital "cover stories". In December 2021, the print edition of Kerrang! was revived, and is now published on a quarterly basis.

== History ==
=== 1980s ===
Kerrang! was founded in 1981. The editor of the weekly music magazine Sounds, Alan Lewis, suggested that Geoff Barton edit a one-off special edition focusing on the new wave of British heavy metal phenomenon and on the rise of other hard rock acts. Billed as a "Sounds Heavy Metal Special", Kerrang!'s first issue was published on 6 June 1981. Angus Young of AC/DC appeared on Kerrang!'s first cover. According to Alan Lewis, the first issue reportedly sold out within days of its publication, and the magazine began being published on a monthly basis. In February 1982, after only eight issues, Kerrang!'s frequency was doubled by its publisher, Spotlight Publications (owned by United Newspapers). Starting with issue 148 in 1987, the publication went weekly. During the 1980s and early 1990s the magazine placed many thrash metal and glam metal acts on the cover, including Tigertailz, Mötley Crüe, Stryper, Slayer, Bon Jovi, Metallica, Poison, and Venom. The term thrash metal was first coined in the music press by Kerrang! journalist Malcolm Dome, in reference to the Anthrax song "Metal Thrashing Mad". Prior to this Metallica's James Hetfield had referred to their sound as "power metal".

=== 1990s ===
In April 1991, Spotlight/United Newspapers sold Kerrang! to EMAP Metro (now known as Ascential plc). Although Kerrang! had an average weekly circulation of 58,685 by this point and was making profits of £1 million a year, the publication had been faced with significant competition from RAW magazine, also owned by EMAP. British journalist David Hepworth, who launched a number of titles for EMAP in the 1980s, said: "We [EMAP] had made it nearly impossible for Spotlight to publish Kerrang! profitably because we promoted RAW and they had to promote back, and that ate into their margins." EMAP moved Kerrang!'s offices to Carnaby Street in London's West End.

In April 1992, Barton left his post as the magazine's editor, and was replaced by Robyn Doreian. Although her tenure as editor was brief, Doreian would balance the magazine's focus between heavy metal and the growing alternative music scene, following the unexpected success of grunge acts such as Nirvana. Phil Alexander became the new editor of Kerrang! in June 1993. Alexander felt that the magazine was lagging behind RAW in terms of its coverage of newer bands, and Kerrang!'s emphasis began to largely eschew previously featured glam/metal acts in favour of modern acts, such as Hole, Nine Inch Nails, Kyuss, Corrosion of Conformity and Machine Head. During the Britpop era, the magazine would largely focus on heavier "Britrock" acts such as The Wildhearts, Manic Street Preachers, Terrorvision and Therapy?. Starting in 1995, Kerrang! began covering the nu metal genre after one of the magazine's journalists, Mörat, was introduced to Korn by Machine Head frontman Robb Flynn. During the late 1990s, the magazine would end up covering the likes of Limp Bizkit, System of a Down, Deftones and Slipknot, and various other punk rock, hip-hop and hardcore acts.

=== 2000s–2020s ===
In April 2000, Paul Rees became the new editor for Kerrang!. In 2001, Kerrang! overtook NME as the biggest selling music weekly in the United Kingdom, bolstered by its coverage of nu metal. By mid-2002, the magazine had a circulation of 83,988 copies per week. After Rees left them to edit Q magazine, former Kerrang! reviews editor Ashley Bird appointed editor from 2003 to 2005. Following his departure, Paul Brannigan took over as editor in May 2005. In the mid-to-late 2000s, the genre focus of Kerrang! shifted once more, with a new emphasis on emo, post-hardcore, pop-punk and metalcore music, coinciding with the decline of nu metal. Furthermore, the magazine continued to occasionally feature more established bands such as Iron Maiden and Metallica on the cover. In 2006, the magazine's circulation stood at 80,186 copies.

In 2008, EMAP sold its consumer magazines to Bauer Media Group. Brannigan left Kerrang! in 2009 and Nichola Browne was appointed editor. She later stepped down in April 2011. Former NME features editor and GamesMaster deputy editor James McMahon was appointed as editor on 6 June 2011.

In April 2017, Kerrang! magazine, its website, and the K! Awards were purchased by Mixmag Media, publisher of dance monthly Mixmag, along with assets related to defunct style magazine The Face. Mixmag has since formed parent company Wasted Talent, which relaunched Kerrang! as a digital-first title, while continuing to publish a weekly print edition. Former Editor-in-Chief Phil Alexander was appointed Global Creative Director on 3 August 2017. Bauer retained ownership of Kerrang! Radio and the Box Plus Network will continue to operate Kerrang! TV as before. An updated Kerrang! logo was debuted in mid-2017 before the magazine received a complete redesign during 2018.

On 13 March 2020, after publishing a total of 1,818 issues, publication of the weekly print edition of Kerrang! was suspended due to the COVID-19 pandemic. The Kerrang! website continued to run articles as normal. On 29 July 2020, the magazine debuted its first weekly digital 'cover story' long-form article, announcing Corey Taylor's first solo album CMFT (2020). In December 2021, a one-off print edition of Kerrang! was published, celebrating the return of live music events in the UK. Sales of this magazine proved successful enough that a second stand-alone print magazine was published in April 2022. The magazine continues to be published on a quarterly basis.

=== International editions ===
Emap launched Kerrang! Australia in the late 1990s. Unlike its weekly counterpart in the UK, the Australian edition was published monthly due to stiff competition from free local music publications. Kerrang! is also published in Spanish and German. Kerrang announced its aim to expand into the US in March 2018.

In March 2018, following a magazine redesign, Kerrang! announced it would be expanding to the United States, with an office in New York run by Ethan Fixell. The goal would be to generate US-centric content, events, and brand partnerships.

== Website ==
Kerrang!'s website, www.kerrang.com, was launched in summer 2001 by Dan Silver. Kerrang!'s parent company Emap acquired the domain name from a Norwegian cybersquatter by the name of Steingram Stegane for a token sum of £666.

Kerrang!'s website features news and features on both contemporary and classic rock bands, as well as previewing upcoming events. The website hosts Kerrang!'s online shop, podcasts, message board, TV and radio segments ensuring more opportunities to sell associated merchandise and products. In 2001, Kerrang! launched its own online forum with the "rants and raves" section taking up most of the traffic. According to Alexa www.kerrang.com is ranked 83,545th globally, and 33,532nd in the U.S.

== Other ventures ==
=== Kerrang! Awards ===
Since 1993, the magazine has held an annual awards ceremony to mark the most successful bands in the interests of their readers. The awards became one of Britain's most recognised events by the now defunct Guinness Book of British Hit Singles & Albums, often listing some of the winners in their annual round-up of the previous year. The event is presented by major music celebrities, with many others outside the industry who attend the event.

After a year hiatus, the Awards were relaunched in 2018, with notable guests that included Johnny Depp, Joe Perry, Tony Iommi, Corey Taylor, and Dave Grohl, among others. After a two-year hiatus due to the COVID-19 pandemic, the ceremony returned in June 2022, with the reader nominations period beginning in April 2022.

=== Kerrang! Radio ===
In 2000, EMAP launched Kerrang! as a DAB radio station, across the United Kingdom. This was principally a 'jukebox' station, playing a back-to-back sequence of rock and alternative music. On 10 June 2004, Kerrang! 105.2 was launched as a regional radio station in Birmingham with an advertising campaign by London-based creative agency ODD. The radio had a number of specialist programmes dedicated to the many subgenres of rock music. The radio output included interviews with those affecting popular culture and society as well as those involved with music. It stopped broadcasting on FM as of 14 June 2013 and once again became a digital station, with listeners able to tune in on DAB or the Kerrang! Radio app. With this broadcasting change came a move in Kerrang! Radio's offices from Birmingham to London. Absolute Radio is now broadcasting on its FM frequency.

=== Kerrang! TV ===
In 2001, EMAP launched Kerrang! TV. As with the radio station, the television channel covers the more mainstream side of the rock music as well as classic rock bands including Aerosmith, AC/DC and Guns N' Roses and classic heavy metal bands such as Iron Maiden, Black Sabbath and Metallica. Kerrang! TV, along with its The Box Plus Network sister channels, was fully owned by Channel Four Television Corporation and subsequently closed due to budget cuts made by Channel 4, along with its sister channels, on 30 June 2024.

=== Kerrang! compilation albums ===
From 1982 the Kerrang! Magazine would occasionally be bundled with compilations, originally on 7" vinyl then moving to cassettes in 1994 and CDs in 1995. The compilations featured new and popular music, music themed around a particular genre, band or theme and best-of lists. In 2001, Kerrang began releasing Kerrang! the Album under Universal Music. From 2016, the albums were released via Rhino Records.

=== Kerrang! Tour ===
The Kerrang! Tour ran from 2006 to 2017. The line-up for each year was usually announced in October of the previous year and was held throughout January and February of the following year. Relentless Energy Drink sponsored the Kerrang! Tour for several years. It is currently unknown if the tour will ever be revived.

- 2006, featured Bullet for My Valentine, Hawthorne Heights, Still Remains and Aiden.
- 2007, featured Biffy Clyro, The Bronx, The Audition and I Am Ghost.
- 2008, featured Coheed and Cambria, Madina Lake, Fightstar and Circa Survive.
- 2009, sponsored by Relentless Energy Drink from this year; featured Mindless Self Indulgence, Dir En Grey, Bring Me the Horizon, Black Tide and In Case of Fire.
- 2010, featured All Time Low, The Blackout, Young Guns and My Passion. Jettblack were added for two dates at the London Roundhouse at the end of the tour.
- 2011, featured Good Charlotte, Four Year Strong, Framing Hanley and The Wonder Years.
- 2012. The tour lasted from 5 to 17 February. It featured New Found Glory, Sum 41, letlive. and While She Sleeps. On 20 January 2012 it was revealed that Sum 41 had been forced to pull out due to frontman Deryck Whibley who had suffered a back injury and was not well enough to perform for the duration of the tour, they were replaced by The Blackout who had previously played on the 2010 tour.
- 2013, featured Black Veil Brides, Chiodos, Tonight Alive and Fearless Vampire Killers. It was an 11-date tour which ran from 3–15 February, with the 6th and 11th being days off. William Control was a guest DJ and also appeared alongside Black Veil Brides on 2 songs; Shadows Die and In the End.
- 2014, featured Limp Bizkit, Crossfaith, Nekrogoblikon and Baby Godzilla.
- 2015, featured Don Broco, We Are the in Crowd, Bury Tomorrow, Beartooth and Young Guns.
- 2016. On 29 September the headliner for the eleventh Kerrang! tour was revealed to be Sum 41. In an interview with Kerrang, frontman Deryck Whibley stated that "After a three-year break, we're honoured that our first tour back is the Kerrang!" The tour featured Sum 41, Roam, Frank Carter & The Rattlesnakes and Biters.
- 2017, featured The Amity Affliction, Boston Manor, Vukovi, and Casey.

=== The K! Pit ===
The year after the final Kerrang! Tour, Kerrang! launched a new gig concept known as "The K! Pit", where the magazine promotes a free gig for a popular band in a tiny London venue. Fans gain access by applying for tickets online and being randomly selected in a competition-style draw. Artists featured so far include Parkway Drive, Mastodon, Fever 333, and Neck Deep, the latter performance coinciding with the 2018 Kerrang! Awards where Neck Deep would win Best Song. The brand has since also launched the series in Brooklyn, New York, featuring artists such as Sum 41, Baroness, Knocked Loose, Daughters, and Fit For An Autopsy. Performances are streamed on the Kerrang! Facebook page before being uploaded to YouTube.

== The Official Kerrang!rock chart ==
During the 1980s, Kerrang! published weekly heavy metal charts for singles, albums and import albums. Each was compiled from sales data from fifty specialist stores across the United Kingdom.

In March 2012, Kerrang! announced a new weekly rock singles chart for the UK based on upon airplay across Kerrang Radio, Kerrang TV, and specialist rock radio stations, as well as sales figures from the Official Charts Company. As of 2020, the chart continues to be printed in the magazine every week, contains 20 tracks, and often features accompanying facts or artist quotes. The official Kerrang Spotify profile also features a playlist of the tracks on the chart and is updated every Wednesday. The chart was announced on Saturday mornings on Kerrang! Radio and could be viewed online every Saturday at midday. The chart would also be shown on Kerrang! TV on Thursdays at 4 pm.

Unlike the UK Rock & Metal Singles Chart produced by the Official Charts Company, which is typically dominated by classic rock artists, the Kerrang! Rock Chart focuses primarily on new releases by contemporary rock artists.

== Kerrang! year-end lists ==
Kerrang! Album of the Year
Year	Artist	Album	Source
1982	Scorpions	Blackout	
1983	Def Leppard	Pyromania	
1984	Van Halen	1984	
1985	Bryan Adams	Reckless	
1986	David Lee Roth	Eat 'Em and Smile	
1987	Aerosmith	Permanent Vacation	
1988	King's X	Out of the Silent Planet	
1989	Faith No More	The Real Thing	
1990	Slayer	Seasons in the Abyss	
1991	Metallica	Metallica	
1992	Alice In Chains	Dirt	
1993	Pearl Jam	Vs.	
1994	Therapy?	Troublegum	
1995	Foo Fighters	Foo Fighters	
1996	Screaming Trees	Dust	
1997	Foo Fighters	The Colour and the Shape	
1998	Monster Magnet	Powertrip	
1999	Foo Fighters	There is Nothing Left to Lose	
2000	Queens of the Stone Age	Rated R	
2001	Tool	Lateralus	
2002	Queens of the Stone Age	Songs for the Deaf	
2003	The Darkness	Permission to Land	
2004	Mastodon	Leviathan	
2005	Trivium	Ascendancy	
2006	Taking Back Sunday	Louder Now	
2007	Biffy Clyro	Puzzle	
2008	Metallica	Death Magnetic	
2009	Gallows	Grey Britain	
2010	Deftones	Diamond Eyes	
2011	Mastodon	The Hunter	
2012	Enter Shikari	A Flash Flood of Colour	
2013	Bring Me the Horizon	Sempiternal	
2014	Architects	Lost Forever // Lost Together	
2015	Bring Me the Horizon	That's the Spirit	
2016	Green Day	Revolution Radio	
2017	Employed to Serve	The Warmth of a Dying Sun	
2018	Turnstile	Time & Space	
2019	Slipknot	We Are Not Your Kind	
2020	Code Orange	Underneath	
2021	Every Time I Die	Radical	
2022	Nova Twins	Supernova	
2023	Foo Fighters	But Here We Are	
2024	Knocked Loose	You Won't Go Before You're Supposed To	
2025	Turnstile	Never Enough	

== Logos ==
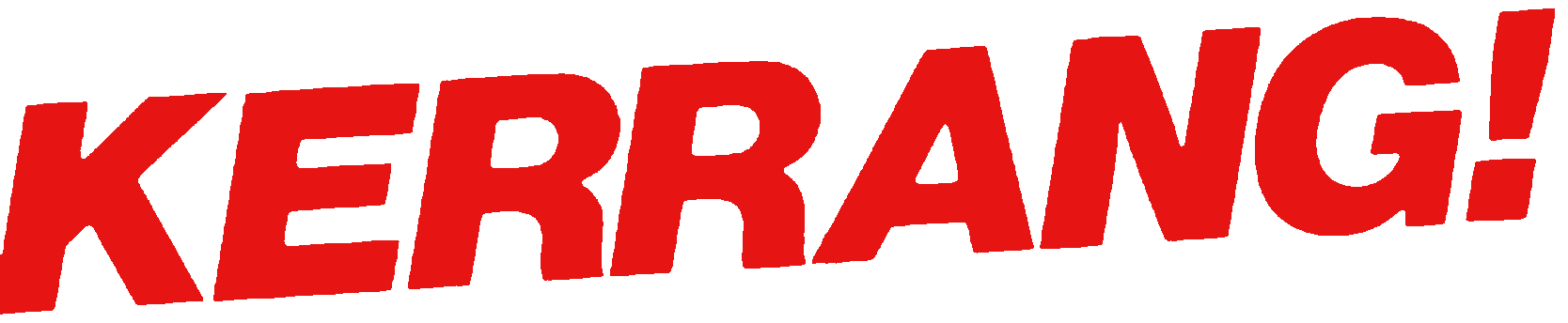
Original Kerrang! logo, used from 1981 to 1982

Logo used from 1996 to 2000

Modified 2000 logo, used from 2004 to 2017

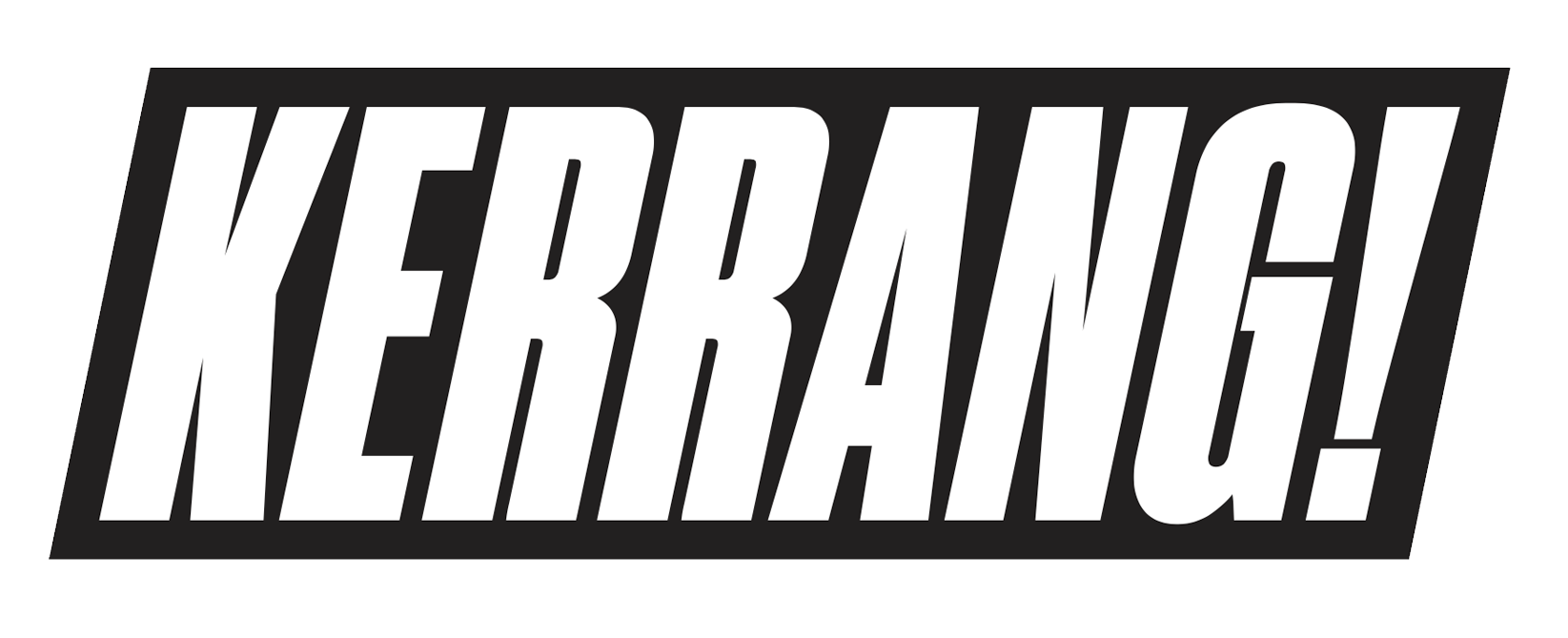
Logo used from 2017 to 2021

Current Kerrang! logo. Originally used from 1983 to 1996, again since 2021

== Bibliography ==
- Brown, Andy R. (2007). "Everything Louder than Everything Else" (PDF). Journalism Studies. 8 (4): 642–655. doi:10.1080/14616700701412209. S2CID 142637249.
- Gorman, Paul (2022). Totally Wired: The Rise and Fall of the Music Press (2023 paperback ed.). UK: Thames & Hudson. pp. 307, 309. ISBN 978-0-500-29746-9.
- Ruskell, Nick (2023). Kerrang! Living Loud. UK: DK. ISBN 978-0-2415-8294-7.
