= Armação dos Búzios =

- Municipality
- Municipality of Armação dos Búzios
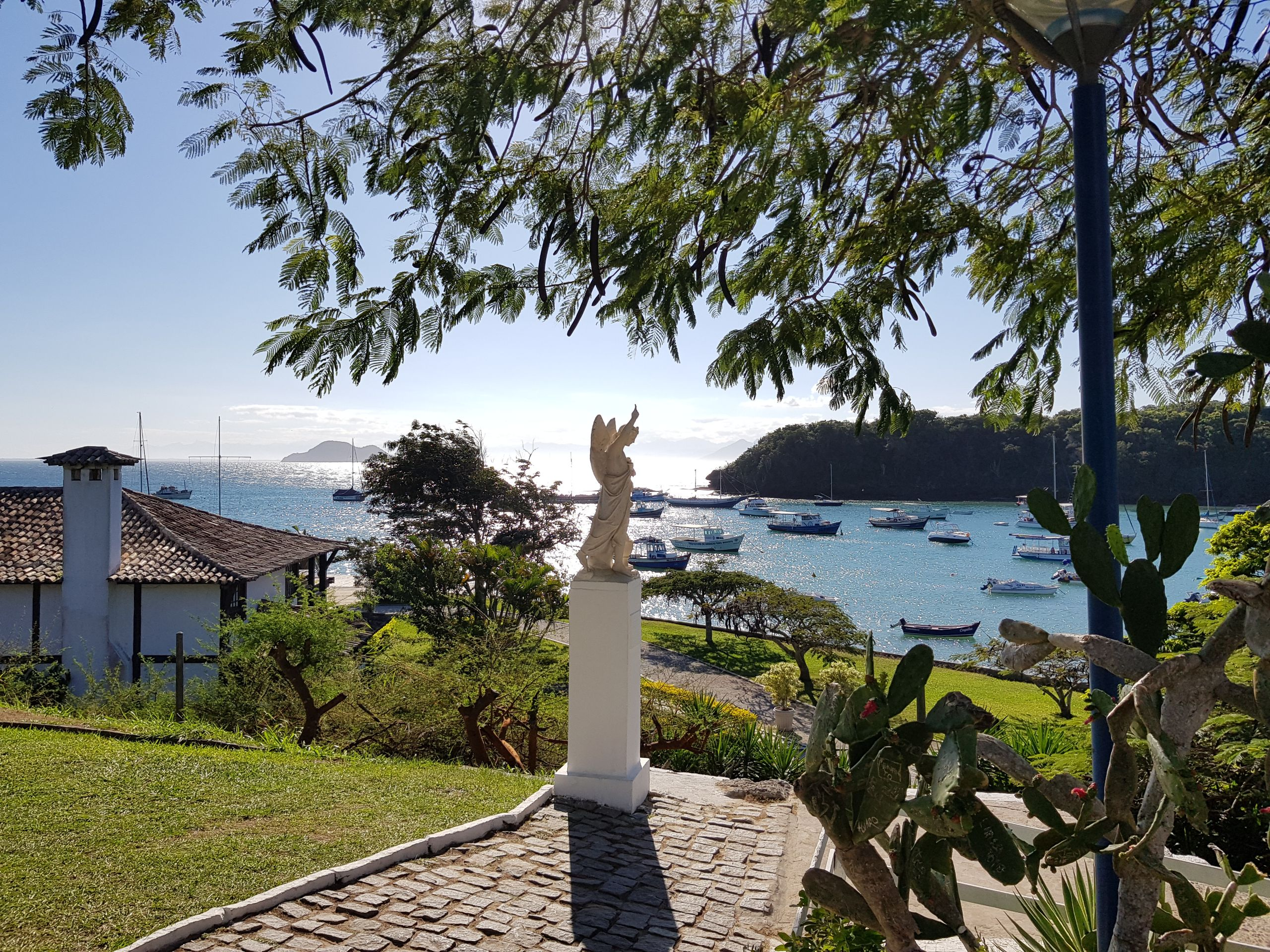
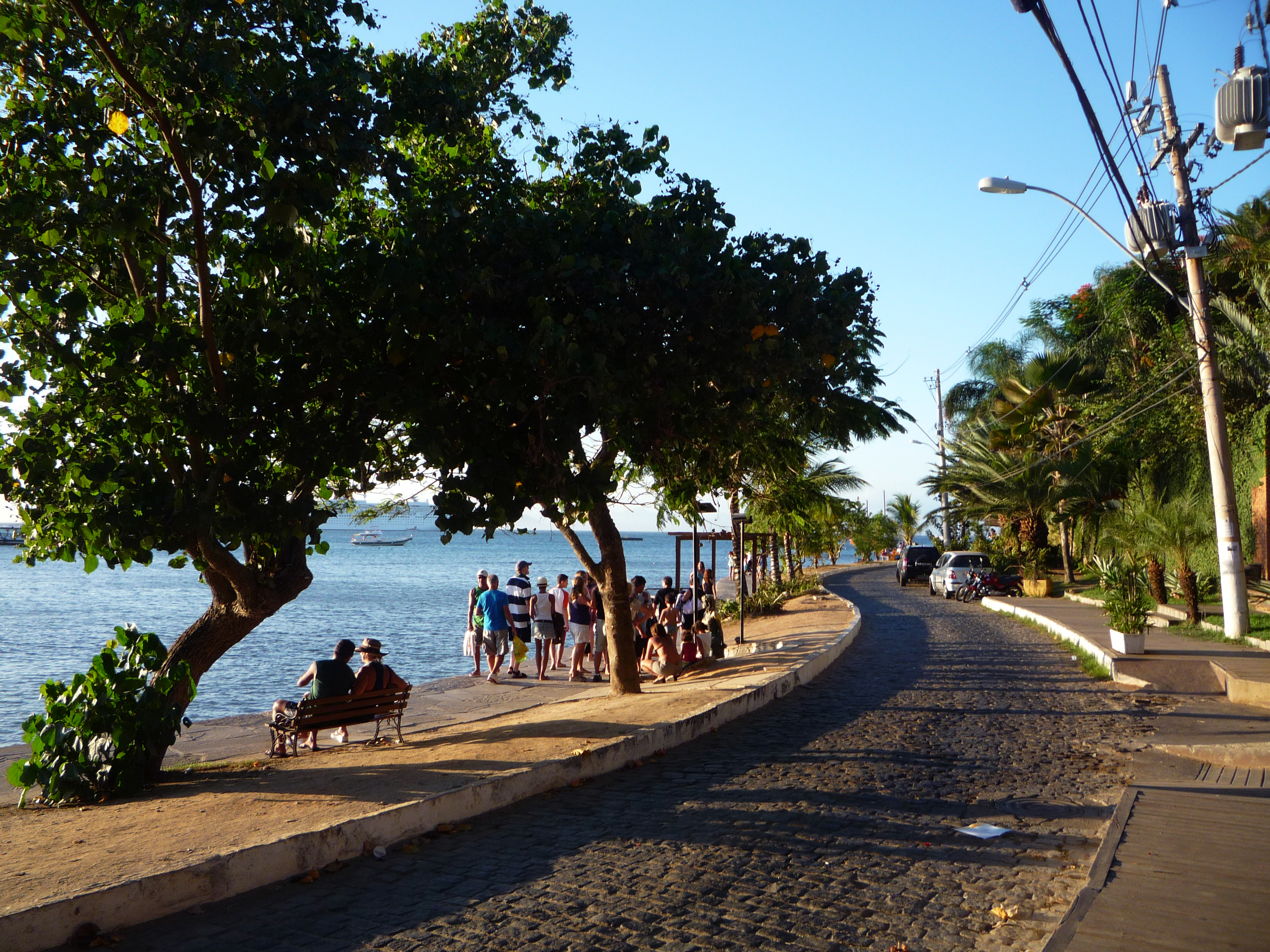
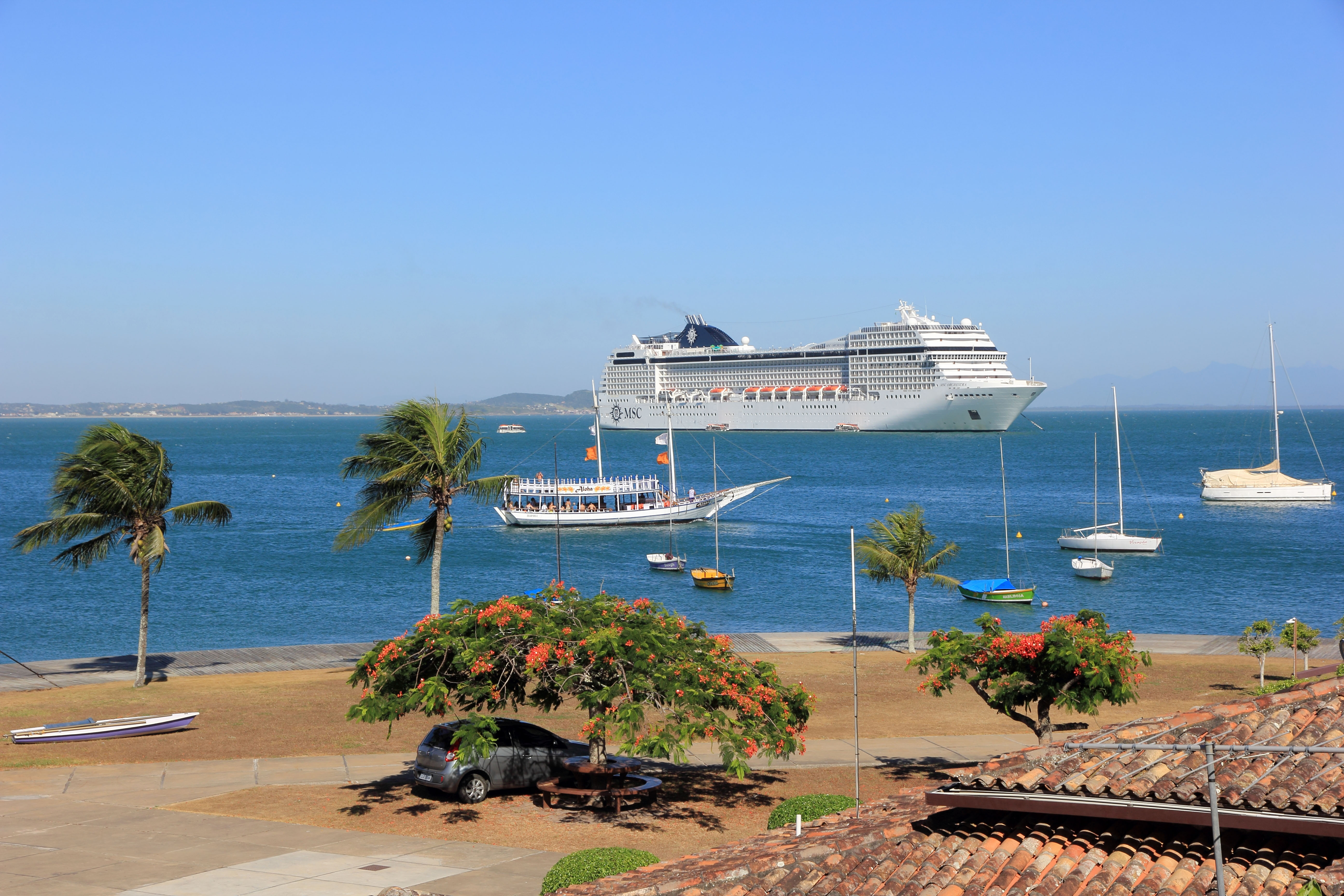
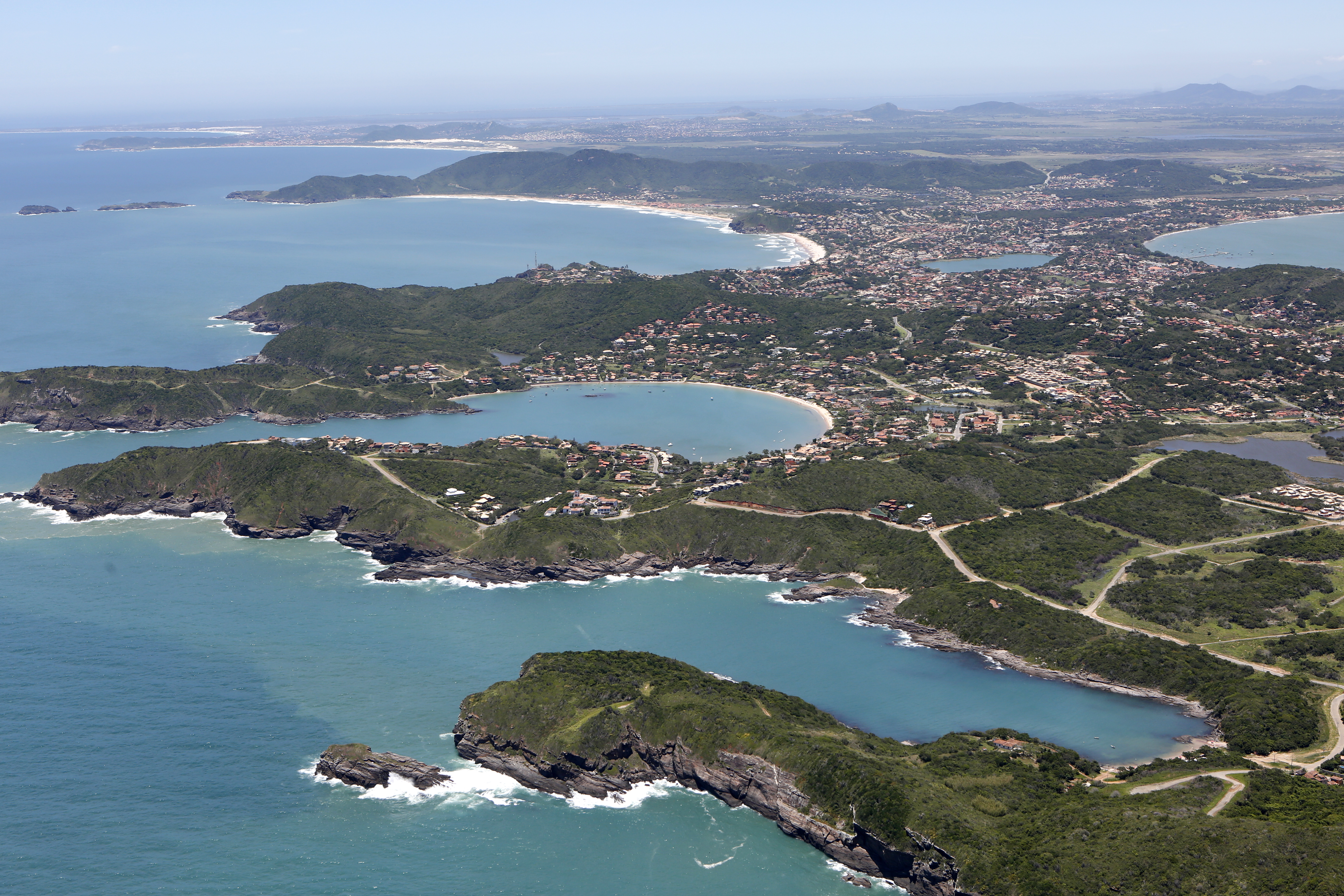
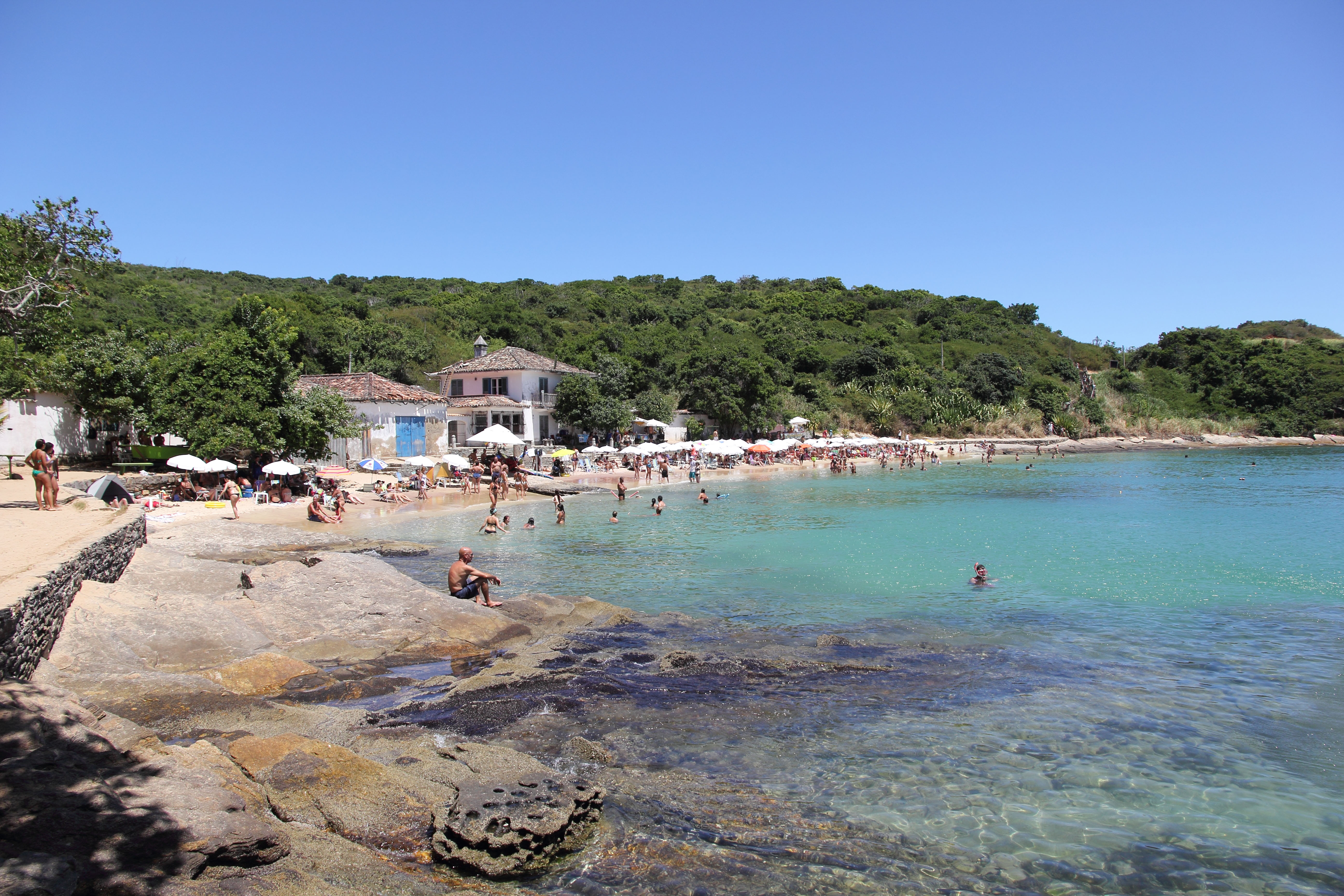
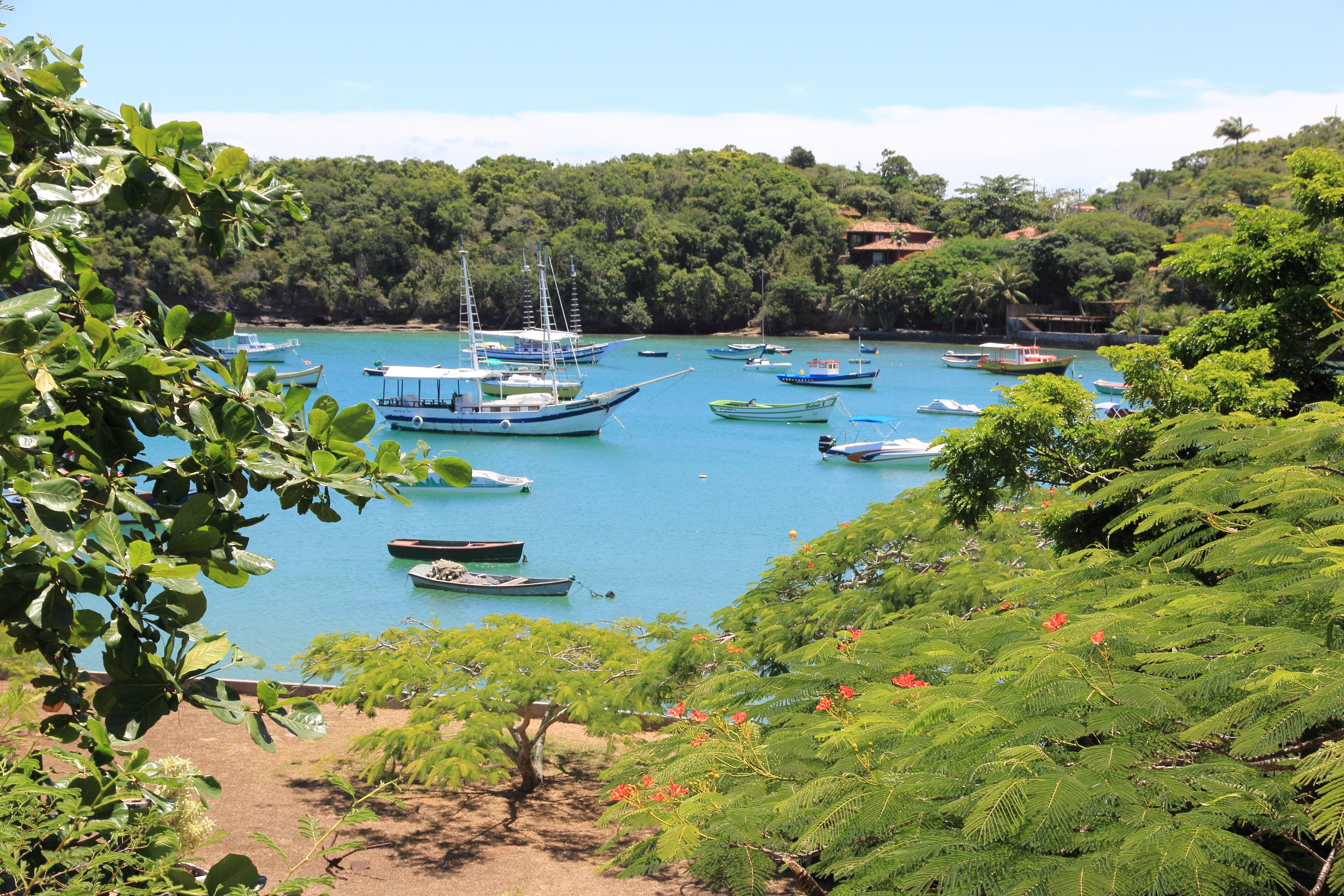
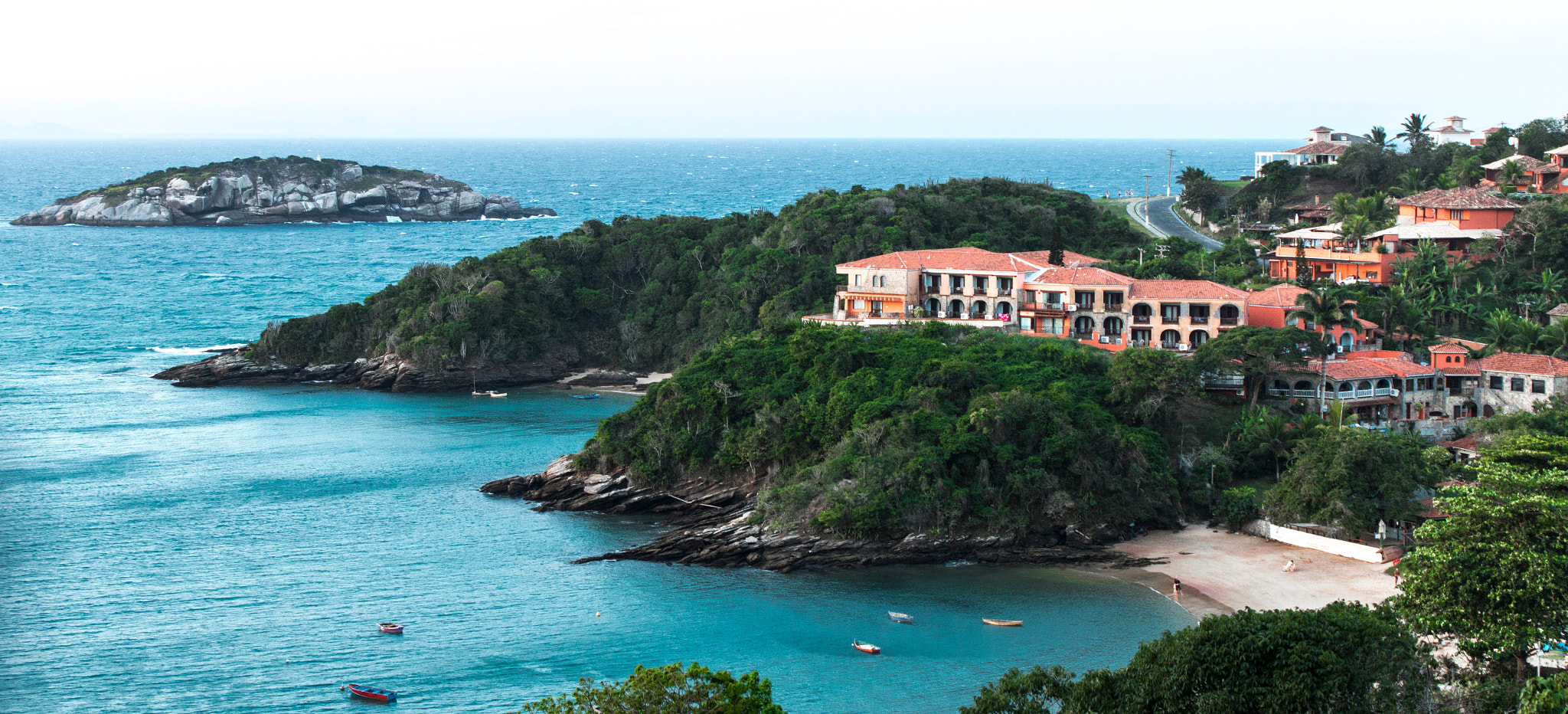

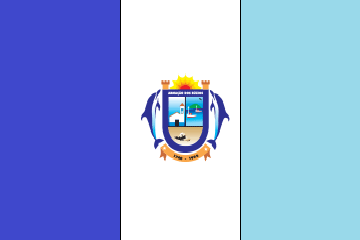
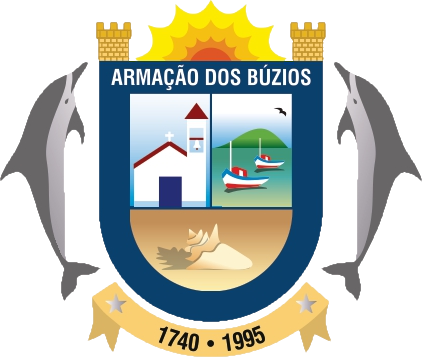
- Flag Coat of arms

- Location in Rio de Janeiro
- Coordinates: 22°44′49″S 41°52′55″W
- Country: Brazil
- Region: Southeast
- State: Rio de Janeiro

Government
  - Mayor: Alexandre Martins (Republicanos)

Area
  - Total: 70.978 km^{2} (27.405 sq mi)
- Elevation: 5 m (16 ft)

Population (2020)
  - Total: 34,477
  - Density: 485.74/km^{2} (1,258.1/sq mi)
- Time zone: UTC−3 (BRT)
- HDI (2010): 0.728 – high
- Website: buzios.rj.gov.br

Armação dos Búzios (Portuguese pronunciation: [aʁmɐˈsɐ̃w duz ˈbuzjus]), often referred to as just Búzios, is a municipality located in the state of Rio de Janeiro, Brazil. It is 173 km east of the city of Rio de Janeiro, and 24 km southwest of Cabo Frio. By 2020, its population consisted of 34,477 inhabitants and its area of 71 km^{2}. Today, Búzios is a worldwide tourist site.

Armação dos Búzios remained almost unknown until 1964, when the French actress Brigitte Bardot visited the small village. Since then, in Búzios became popular with the Carioca's high society, who wanted to escape from the city life of Rio de Janeiro and enjoy over 23 beaches the peninsula offers. The town eventually grew to be an international tourist destination.

The peninsula's west coast beaches offer calm, clear waters while the east coast ones, facing the open sea, are more wild and draw surfers and water sports enthusiasts. Azeda, Ferradura, João Fernandes and Armação are amongst the most popular beaches in town. At night, Rua das Pedras, Armação dos Búzios' main street, offers its visitors an active nightlife and a great variety of shopping and restaurants.

== History ==
During the 16th century, the Tupinambá Indians occupied the area, which is now known as Búzios. During the 17th century, the Europeans invaded what was then a small village and as a result, the Tupinambá developed strict relationships with the French pirates and smugglers, who were interested in smuggling pau-brasil (Brazilian reddish wood) and selling African Slaves. Eventually the French were expelled by the Portuguese due to their bloody disputes with the Tupinambás, which resulted in a significant decrease in the Indian population in that region.

In the 18th century, the gold trade from Minas Gerais and its exportation to Europe from Rio de Janeiro attracted many ships to the Guanabara Bay. Additionally the increasing number of ships along the city's coast brought close attention to the whale hunting practice that took place in that area. The name "Armação dos Búzios", for instance, comes from the process of separating the meat from the bones. In addition, a beach in Búzios called "Praia dos Ossos" was named after the great amount of whales' bones found along the shore. Another curious fact about this practice at the time was that the city lights were fueled with whale oil, and the Sant'Ana Chapel located on the top of a hill between Praia dos Ossos and Praia da Armação, was built with rocks and whale oil as well.

Around 1850 when slave trade was abolished in Brazil, Búzios was able to establish itself as a city that cultivated agricultural and fishing habits, instead of being just a smuggling, slave-trading and whale-hunting site. With time, the once European dominated city, shifted into a community composed by a mix of native descendants, blacks and interracial citizens. In 1940, Antonio Alipio da Silva was the first political representative to initiate a political life in Búzios. As a consequence, the small town started to grow and attract a greater variety of people. During the mid-1900s, Búzios was already known to Rio's high society, as it was a relatively reserved beach getaway from the chaotic urban life. However, it was only around 1964, when Brigitte Bardot visited the small town, that Armação dos Búzios actually became well known.

== Geography ==
Armação dos Búzios is located in the state of Rio de Janeiro, Brazil, in an area known as Região dos Lagos. The peninsula of 8 kilometers in extension features 23 beaches: Geribá, Tartaruga, João Fernandes, João Fernandinho, Ferradura, Ferradurinha, Azeda, Azedinha, Ossos, Manguinhos, Tucuns, Brava, Amores, Armação, Forno, Foca, Olho de Boi, Caravelas, José Gonçalves, Virgens, Canto, Rasa, Moças.

=== Climate ===
Armação dos Búzios has a tropical climate and temperatures in the southern hemisphere tend to vary between 30 °C during the months of November and February, and around 20 C from May to September. Ocean breezes are common all year round, but are more frequent and stronger during the winter. Most rainfall is seen in Jan, Feb, Mar, Nov and Dec. Armação dos Búzios has dry periods in June and August.

== Transportation ==
Armação dos Búzios is served by Umberto Modiano Airport which operates flights of general aviation. Also, Búzios is accessible by bus or car from Rio de Janeiro, situated about 170 km to the south. Travel time by car is typically around three hours, depending on traffic. There are several reputable bus companies that offer services between these two destinations which provides intercity transfers between Rio de Janeiro (airport, hotels, bus stations) and Búzios.

== Parking ==
Public parking is available near major beaches such as Ferradura, Geribá, and João Fernandes, but spaces fill quickly in peak season. In high-traffic areas like Rua das Pedras and Orla Bardot, “Zona Azul” curbside parking uses time credits linked to the vehicle's license plate.The rate is about R$4.90 per hour, payable by cash, card, or PIX. Private lots (“estacionamento”) are common across Búzios and usually charge a daily fee that varies by location and season, roughly R$20 in low season to R$50 in high season, and are typically close to main destinations.

== Gallery ==
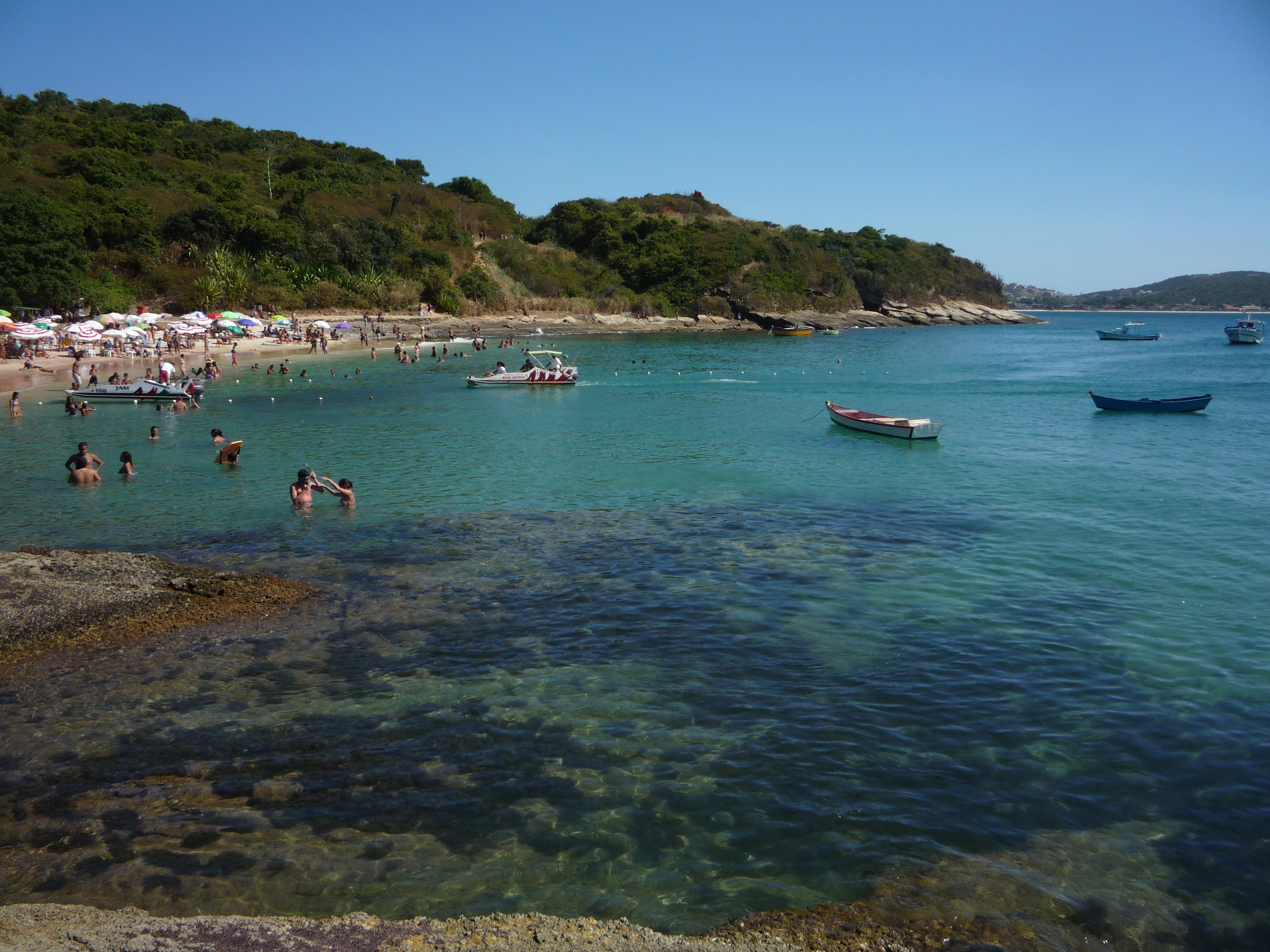
Azeda beach

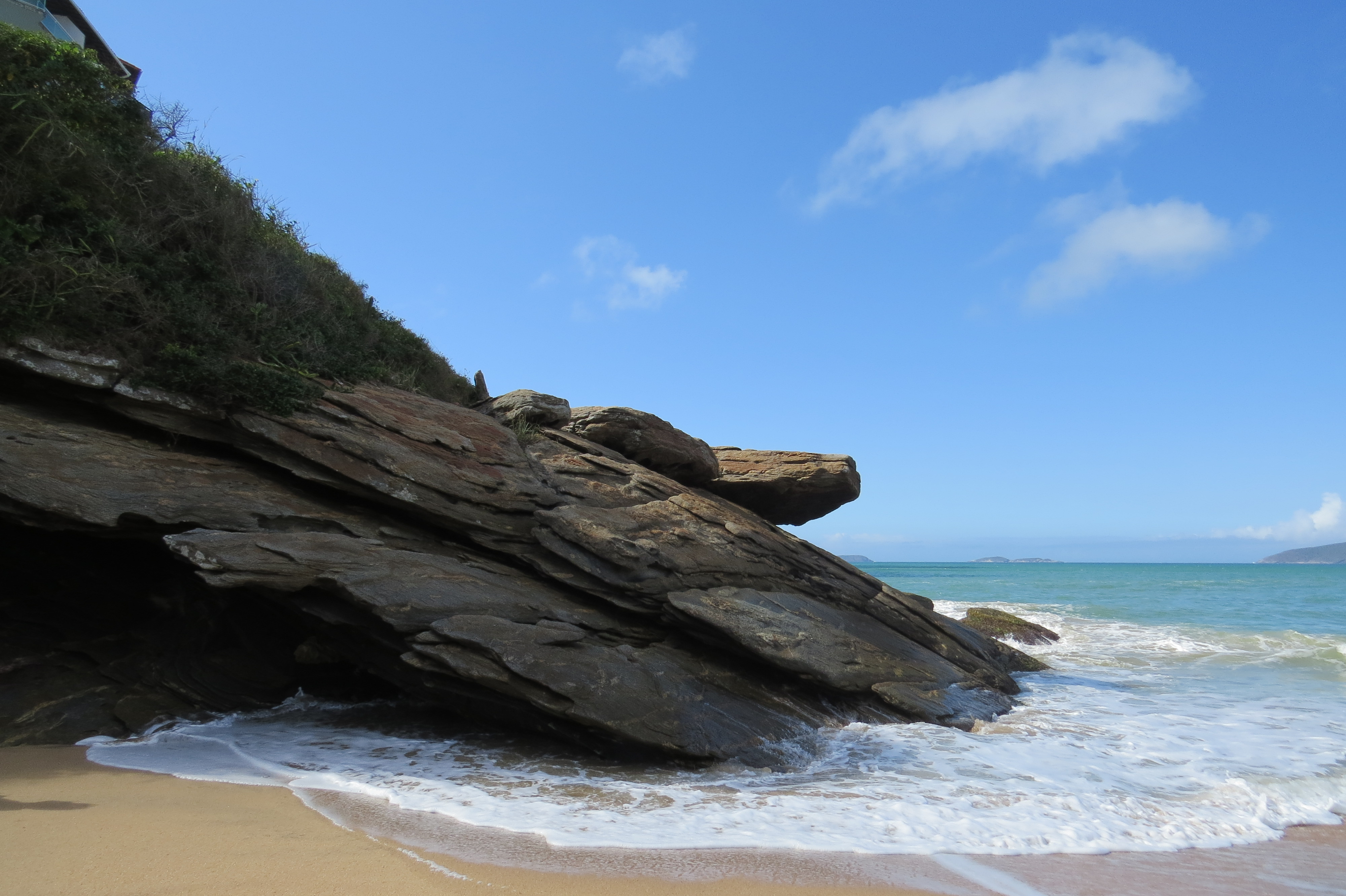
Caravelas beach

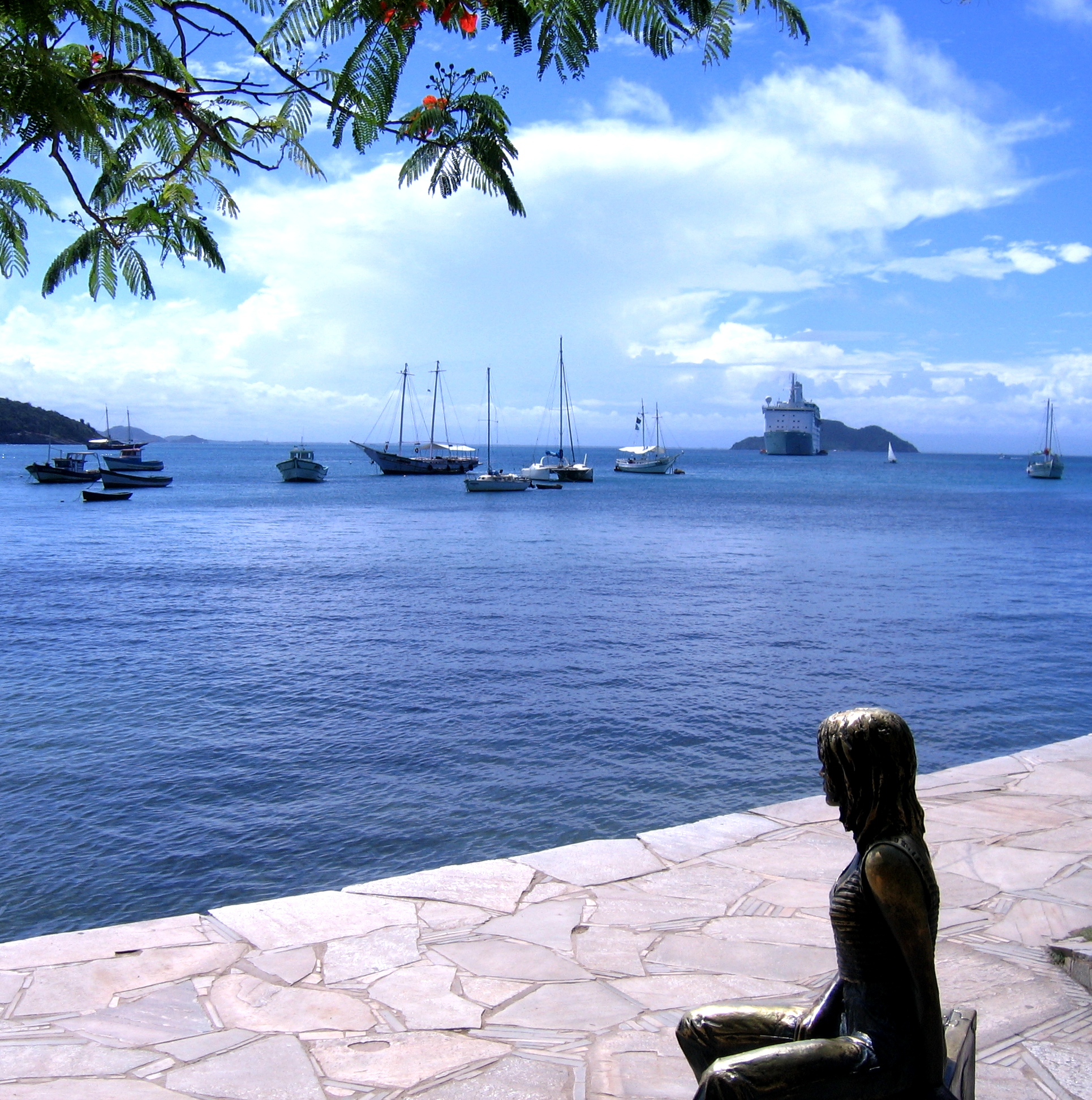
Bardot bay

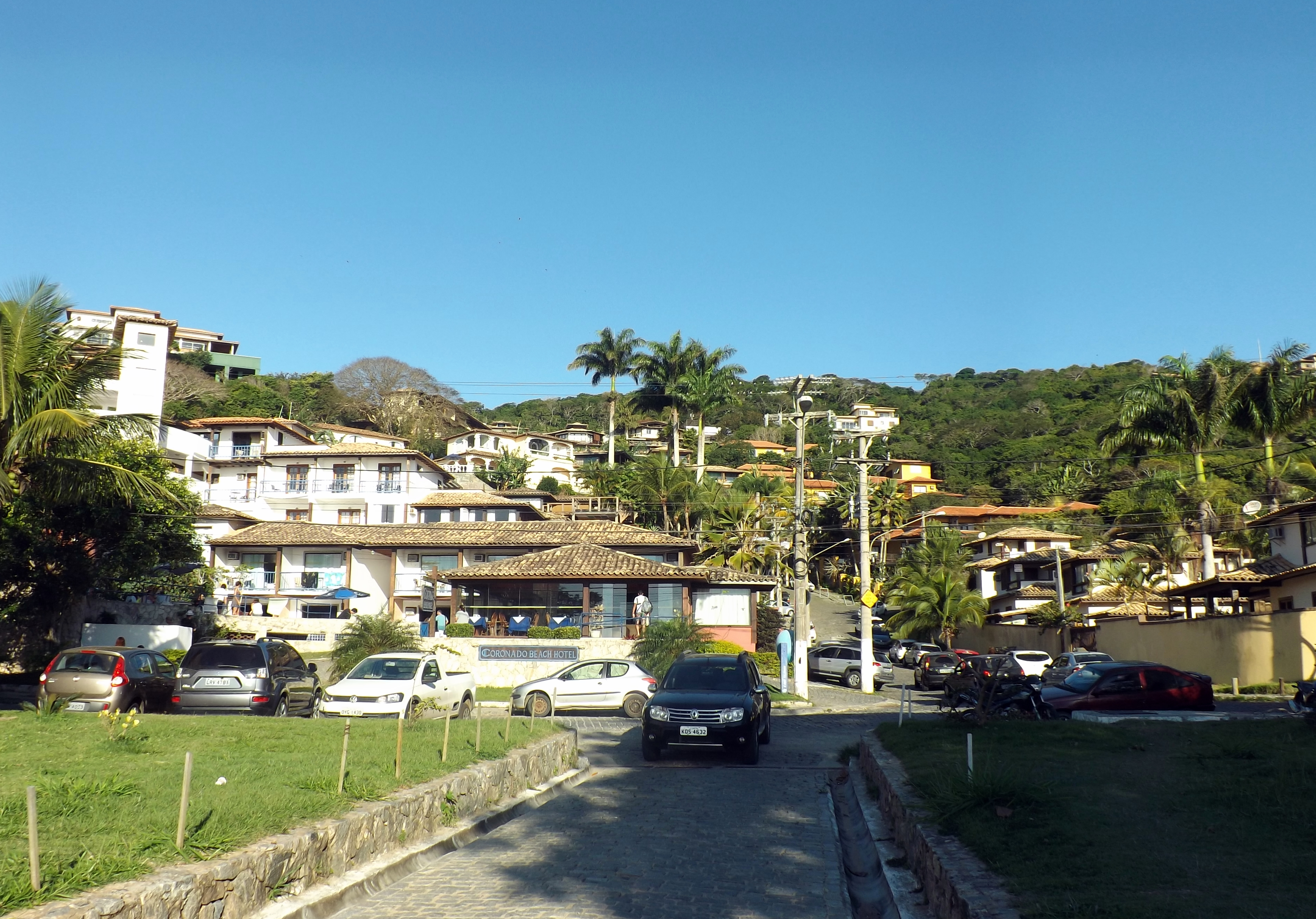
Streets of Armação dos Búzios

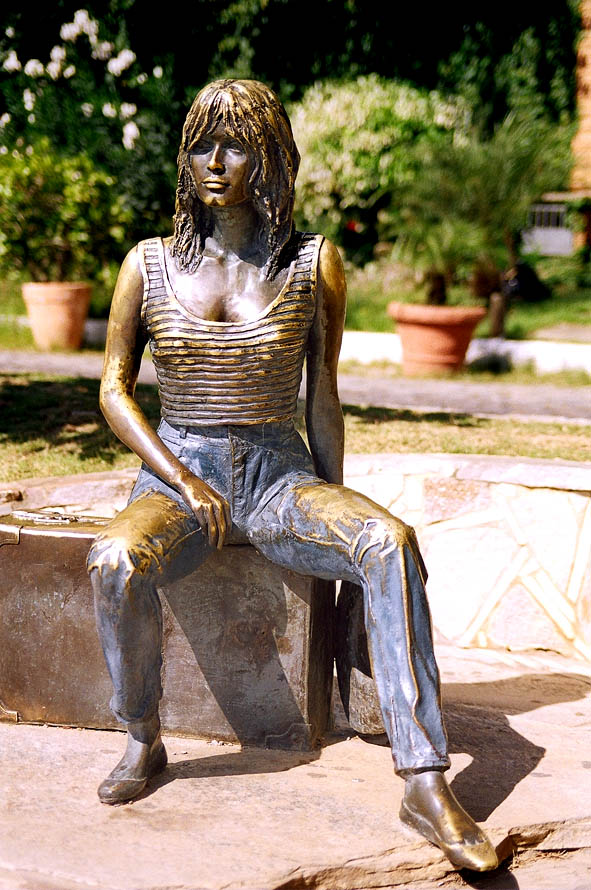

== Notable people ==
- Lenny Lobato, footballer.

== Places of interest ==
- Chapel Our Lady Untier of Knots.
