= Modigliani =

Modigliani ([modiʎˈʎaːni]) is a Jewish Italian surname, which may refer to:

== People ==
- Amedeo Modigliani (1884–1920), painter and sculptor
- Elio Modigliani (1860–1932), anthropologist, zoologist, and plant collector
- Ettore Modigliani (1873–1947), Italian functionary
- Franco Modigliani (1918–2003), economist
- Jeanne Modigliani (1918–1984), daughter and biographer of Amedeo Modigliani

== Other uses ==
- Modigliani (film), a 2004 biographical film about Amedeo Modigliani
- "Modigliani (Lost In Your Eyes)", a 1987 single from the band Book of Love

== See also ==
- Modigliani–Miller theorem, an influential element of economic theory
- Modigliani risk-adjusted performance, a measure of risk-adjusted performance in economics
