= Etan Boritzer =

American writer of children's literature

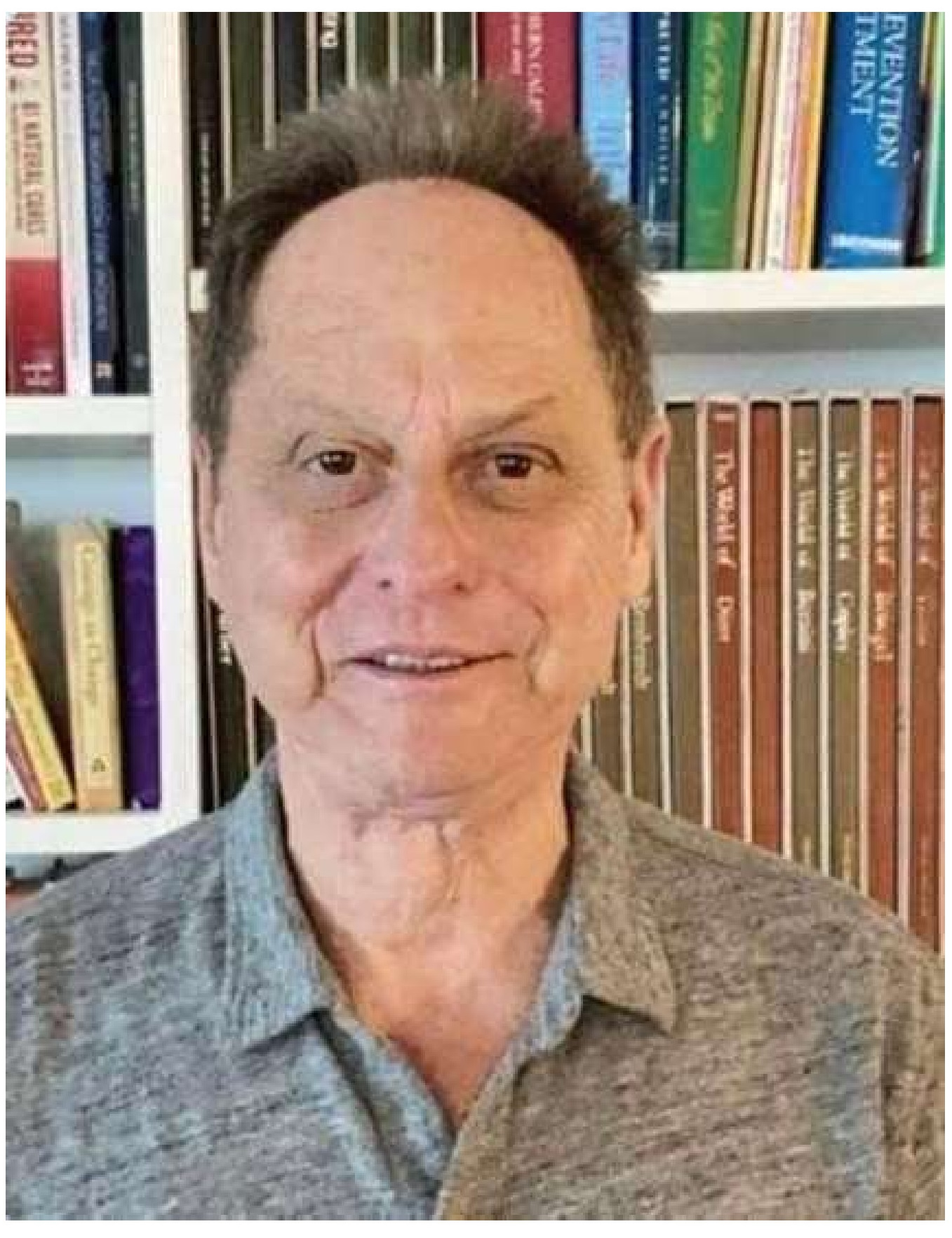
- Born: 1950 (age 75–76)
- Occupation: Author
- Writing career
- Genre: Children's literature
- Notable work: What Is? series

Etan Boritzer (born 1950) is an American writer of children’s literature. He is best known for the What is God? series, a collection of illustrated children's books that introduce philosophical, ethical, social, and emotional concepts for young readers. First published in 1989 with ''What Is God?'', the series has expanded to include titles on topics such as peace, friendship, family, money, death, and citizenship.

Boritzer's books are held in libraries in the United States and internationally. His books have been reviewed in publishing and educational media for their approach to introducing philosophical, ethical, and social topics to young readers.

== Biography ==
Boritzer was first published in 1963 at the age of 13, when he wrote an essay for his English class at Wade Junior High School in the Bronx, New York, about the assassination of John F. Kennedy. The essay was included in a special anthology compiled and published by the New York City Department of Education for New York City public school children.

He went on to work as a Hollywood screenwriter and TV writer, an actor, a journalist, a blogger, and a ghostwriter. For 20 years, Boritzer owned BGH Galley, a contemporary fine art gallery at the Bergamot Station Arts Center in Santa Monica, CA.

In 1989, Boritzer published What is God?, which brought him national critical attention and also drew criticism from religious fundamentalists over its universalist perspective. His bestselling What is? series was created when he decided to tackle his seven-year-old niece’s difficult life questions through a series of kids’ books.

The series has since grown to 17 more title, published in 21 languages and addresses emotional and social topics such as death, love, and prejudice for a young readership to better understand themselves, others, and the world around them.

In 1992, Boritzer founded the publishing company Veronica Lane Books, through which he has run How to Get Your Book Published! programs to help other authors reach publication. Boritzer is also a yoga and meditation teacher, and has spoken publicly as an erudite speaker on The Original Teachings of the Buddha on his YouTube videos.

=== Selected Books authored ===
- What Is Love? Paperback (1996)
- What Is Beautiful? (2004)
- What Is Right? (2004)
- What Is a Friend? (2008)
- What is Death? (2008)
- What Is True? (2010)
