= Ethan Allen Andrews =

Ethan Allen Andrews may refer to:

- Ethan Allen Andrews (lexicographer) (1787–1858), American educator and lexicographer
- Ethan Allen Andrews (biologist) (1859–1956), American biologist
