= Ethan Fixell =

American singer

- Born: April 8, 1982 (age 44); New York, NY, United States

Comedy career
- Medium: Writing, Video, Digital Media
- Website: ethanfixell.com

Ethan Fixell is a writer, editor and producer from New York City.

== Writing ==
Fixell was the U.S. Executive Director of Kerrang! Magazine, the UK-founded rock music publication.

A Certified Cicerone, Certified Specialist of Spirits, and Certified Specialist of Wine, Fixell has written about beverages for Food & Wine, Saveur, Quartz (publication), Travel + Leisure, Vanity Fair (magazine), and Food Republic, among other publications. He teaches beverage classes in New York City at venues such as Astor Center and NYC Wine Company. In 2017, he was the editor-in-chief of the Anheuser-Busch-funded The Beer Necessities.

Previously, Fixell was the Dating Advice editor for About.com, and wrote about dating for MTV News, AskMen, The Daily Dot, Cosmopolitan, and Women's Health. For two and a half years, Ethan wrote the "Ask A Guy" dating advice column for gURL.com.

== Comedy ==
From 2008 to 2016, Fixell was best known as one half of double dating comic duo Dave and Ethan, along with his childhood friend Dave Ahdoot. Together, they toured hundreds of colleges and appeared on the Tonight Show multiple times. In January 2016, Dave and Ethan's TV show, Dave and Ethan: Lovemakers debuted on NBC's digital comedy network, Seeso, with six episodes.

Fixell co-hosted a weekly guy's advice show called "Dude, Seriously", and was the host of PBS's "Bongo Bongo", a show about etymology. He appeared multiple times on "Dirty, Sexy, Funny, with Jenny McCarthy" on Sirius Satellite Radio.
