= Ethan James =

Ethan James may refer to:

- Ethan James (producer) (1946–2003), musician, record producer, and recording engineer
- Ethan James (rugby union), South African rugby union player
- Ethan James (Power Rangers), a fictional Power Rangers character
