= Ethan Harris =

Ethan Harris may refer to:

- Ethan Harris (singer)
- Ethan Harris (lacrosse), player on Scotland national men's lacrosse team
