= Ethan Cohen =

Ethan Cohen could refer to the following people:

- Ethan Cohen (gallerist) (born 1961), American gallerist based in New York City.
- Etan Cohen (born 1974), Israel-born American film writer

== See also ==
- Ethan Coen (born 1957), Minnesota-born American film writer/director/producer of the Coen brothers
