= Ethan Hitchcock =

Ethan Hitchcock may refer to:

- Ethan A. Hitchcock (general) (1798–1870), U.S. Army general
- Ethan A. Hitchcock (politician) (1835–1909), United States Secretary of the Interior; nephew of the former
