= Ethan Davidson =

American musician (born 1969)

- Born: Ethan Daniel Davidson; October 21, 1969 (age 56); Lansing, Michigan
- Occupations: Musician, songwriter, philanthropist
- Years active: 1999–present
- Labels: Blue Arrow Records; Speedsmen; Times Beach Records (formerly)
- Website: www.ethandanieldavidson.com

Ethan Daniel Davidson (born October 21, 1969) is an American musician and philanthropist known for producing folk music. Since the late 1990s, Davidson has released ten studio albums.

== Early life and education ==
He is the son of billionaire William "Bill" Davidson, former owner of the Detroit Pistons and Guardian Industries, which was purchased by Koch Industries in 2017. He has one sister, Marla Karimipour, and three stepsisters, including actress Elizabeth Reaser. He was raised in Bloomfield, Michigan and attended Lahser High School. While attending Lahser High School, he was involved in the school band, which he credited with sparking an early interest in music for him.

Davidson graduated from the University of Michigan with a Bachelor of Arts in English. He also studied at Harvard University, the University of Chicago, and the Jewish Theological Seminary. After graduating, he traveled as a bass player in various East Coast bands, and later moved to Alaska.

== Music career ==
=== Early career ===
Davidson first began writing music in the 1990s while living in Wiseman, Alaska. While living in Alaska, he toured the United States on his Six Year Tour during which he played over 900 shows. His first six albums were produced by Al Sutton on his former record label, Times Beach Records, and recorded in Royal Oak, Michigan.

=== 2012–present ===
Davidson's wife Gretchen Gonzales Davidson and Warren Defever of His Name Is Alive produced four of Davidson's records, including Silvertooth (2012) and Drawnigh (2015). Davidson and Gretchen founded the band Seedsmen of the World together. Davidson's 2017 album Crows was produced by Blue Arrow Records of Cleveland, Ohio.

Davidson and his wife co-produced the documentary Call Me Bill: The William Davidson Story, which headlined the 2019 Lenore Marwil Detroit Jewish Film Festival. The 90-minute film follows the life of William Davidson and highlights his business philosophies. Davidson also produced the soundtrack for the documentary, which was directed by Deb Agolli and Push Media.

On August 18, it was announced that Davidson was releasing another album, titled Come Down Lonesome, produced with his wife and Defever. The album was released on August 21, 2020, and included both original songs and covers.

Davidson's song "Till the Light Comes Shining In" was featured in Season One, Episode 7 of the Spectrum Original television show Joe Pickett .

In 2022, Davidson released Stranger on Blue Arrow Records of Cleveland, Ohio and produced by Gretchen Gonzales Davidson and Warren Defever of His Name Is Alive, featuring Joey Mazzola, and Steven Nistor, among others.

In 2025, Davidson released companion albums Cordelia and Lear on Blue Arrow Records of Cleveland, Ohio. The albums were produced by Luther Dickinson and David Katznelson and feature Marco Giovino, Rayfield “Ray Ray” Holloman, Byron House, Alvin Youngblood Hart, and Jimbo Mathus.

== Books ==
- Davidson, Ethan Daniel (2021). These Are the Developments of the Human. El Studio 444. ISBN 978-0-578-83010-0
- Davidson, Ethan Daniel (2024). And They Arose Early To Do Sexual Violence: My Personal Mirror of Torah. El Studio 444. ISBN 979-8-218-49222-9

== Style and influences ==
Davidson's style has been described as folk, folk rock, and American folk, with influences from artists such as Reverend Gary Davis, Bob Dylan, and Mississippi John Hurt. Mike McGonigal of the Metro Times compared his ability to combine various musical genres to Calexico. His early music often featured heavily political themes, while his later albums focus more on existential conflicts.

== Personal life ==
Davidson is married to Gretchen Gonzales Davidson, a musician best known for her participation in the band Slumber Party, which released three records on the label Kill Rock Stars. Together, the couple have three children.

== Philanthropy ==
Davidson was named as the board chair for the Michigan Opera Theatre, succeeding Rick Williams, who stepped down in 2019. Davidson also serves as a board member at Motown Museum and the Detroit Institute of Arts.

Davidson is Treasurer and Chairman of the Grants Committee for The William Davidson Foundation, which was founded by his father.

== Discography ==
Studio albums
Year	Title	Label
2025	Lear	Blue Arrow Records
2025	Cordelia	Blue Arrow Records
2022	Stranger	Blue Arrow Records
2020	Come Down Lonesome	Blue Arrow Records
2017	Crows	Blue Arrow Records
2015	Drawnigh	Seedsmen
2012	Silvertooth	Seedsmen
2005	Free The Ethan Daniel Davidson Five	Times Beach Records
2004	Don Quixote De Suburbia	Times Beach Records
2004	Better Living Through Creative Selling	Times Beach Records
2001	Bootleg Series Vol. 1	Times Beach Records
2001	This Machine Kills Fascists	Times Beach Records
2000	Ring Them Bells	Times Beach Records
1999	Alaska 11 North	Times Beach Records

== Filmography ==
Year	Title	Role	Notes
2019	Call Me Bill: The William Davidson Story	Executive producer, composer	Documentary
2017	"My Crows"	Performer	Music video
2015	"Count the Knives"	Performer	Music video
2014	"Death Don't Have No Mercy"	Performer	Music video
2014	"Stockton"	Performer	Music video
2014	"Ain't the Man I Used to Be"	Performer	Music video
2014	Til the Light Comes Shining In	Performer	Music video
2013	"I See Satan Fall Like Lightning"	Performer	Music video
2012	"The Dogs Howl, The Caravan Moves On"	Performer	Music video
