= Ethan Brown =

Ethan Brown may refer to:

- Ethan Brown (journalist) (born 1972), American investigative journalist and author
- Ethan Allen Brown (1776–1852), American jurist
- Ethan Brown (businessman) (born 1971), American business executive

== See also ==
- Ethan Browne
