= Ethan Cook =

American artist

- Known for: contemporary art, abstract art, process art

Ethan Cook is a Brooklyn-based contemporary and process artist best known for his large-scale canvases of unmodulated color blocks that he partially weaves himself. Cook creates work with the appearance of a traditional, nonobjective painting; however, his work does not contain any paint, only carefully woven fabric. Cook's process work has been likened to the work of Abstract Expressionists Mark Rothko and Agnes Martin, and his art has been featured in the Los Angeles Times, the New York Times, Architectural Digest and Interview Magazine, among other publications.

== Personal life ==
Cook and his former partner, Wray Serna, divide their time between their Clinton Hill apartment and their country home in the Catskills.

== Bodies of work ==
=== Woven Canvases, 2012-ongoing ===
In 2012, Cook began his series of large-scale monochrome works on canvas with minimalist blocks of unmodulated color. Each canvas is a hybrid product of both store-bought machine-made canvas but also canvas that Cook wove himself using a hand loom. The duality of his process creates a dichotomy between craft and machine, perfection and imperfection, consistency and inconsistency and expansion and intimacy. These works share the aesthetic of paintings, yet are not made from paint, instead exploring the quiet subtlety of fabric itself. Cook celebrates the humble, traditional practice of weaving while also modernizing the technique through his use of scale, process and public exhibition.

=== Devotional Objects, 2015 ===
In this series, Cook fabricated large-scale relief sculptures from fiberglass of everyday objects. The artist found his inspiration from common bric-a-brac figurines—such as The Virgin Mary, cherubs and angels—that are culturally embedded with devotional significance. Cook re-interprets often overlooked household tchotchkes by altering their scale and materiality and re-contexting them to an exhibition environment.

== Auction and exhibition history ==
Cook has a robust exhibition and auction history throughout the United States and Europe. He has sold work at international auction houses Phillip's, Sotheby's and Christie's, and on the online auction platform, Artsy. In 2014, Cook's handwoven works were featured in a group show at the Sadie Coles Gallery in London. In 2019, the artist showed work at the annual Art Brussels fair in Belgium, a fair that spotlights unconventional process and materials.
