= Umberto Modiano Airport =

Umberto Modiano Airport Aeroporto Umberto Modiano
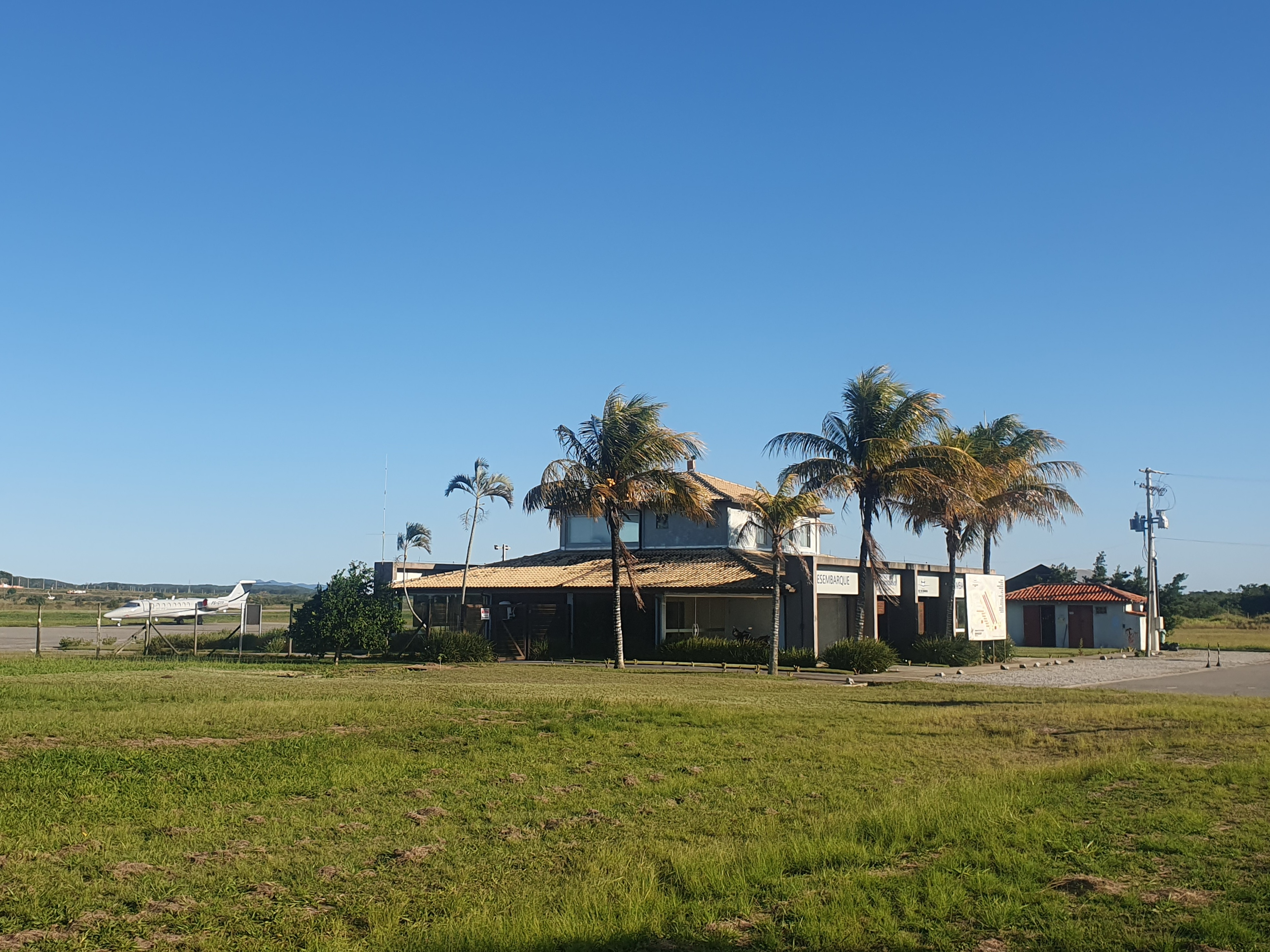
- Terminal building
- IATA: BZC; ICAO: SSBZ; LID: RJ0012

Summary
- Airport type: Private
- Operator: Dix Aeroportos (2026-present)
- Serves: Armação dos Búzios
- Time zone: BRT (UTC−03:00)
- Elevation AMSL: 3 m (9.8 ft)
- Coordinates: 22°46′16″S 041°57′48″W

Map
- Location in Brazil BZC (Brazil)

Runways
Direction	Length		Surface
Direction	m	ft	Surface
08/26	1,300	4,265	Asphalt
- Sources: ANAC, DECEA

Umberto Modiano Airport (IATA: BZC, ICAO: SSBZ), formerly SBBZ is the airport serving Armação dos Búzios, Brazil. It is named after Umberto Modiano, a businessman who owned Marina Porto Búzios, Nas Rocas Hotel, and financially supported the emancipation movement of Armação dos Búzios, which was completed in 1995.

It is operated by Dix Aeroportos.

== History ==
The airport was inaugurated in 2003 and it is dedicated to general aviation. On July 11, 2012 the facility was temporarily closed to conduct renovation works demanded by the National Civil Aviation Agency of Brazil. On May 28, 2016, after completing the renovations and legal procedures, the airport was again opened for general aviation.

On January 8, 2026 Dix Aeroportos was contracted to manage the airport.

== Access ==
The airport is located 8 km (5 mi) from downtown Búzios.

== See also ==
- List of airports in Brazil
