= Ethan Ross =

Ethan Ross may refer to:

- Ethan Ross (footballer, born 2001), Scottish football striker
- Ethan Ross (footballer, born 1997), English football goalkeeper
