= Ethan Carter =

Ethan Carter may refer to:

- Ethan Carter, a character in The Vanishing of Ethan Carter, a 2014 suspense video game
- Ethan Carter III, an American professional wrestler
