= Ethan Ruby =

American philanthropist

Ethan Ruby is the president and CEO of Theraplant, a company that produces and processes legal medical marijuana in Connecticut, and is president of the Connecticut Medical Cannabis Council. He became involved in debates over medical marijuana in part because, after a traffic accident left him a paraplegic, he has given testimony about the benefits he has received from his use of cannabis for control of severe pain.

== Background ==
Ruby was a star baseball player at Moses Brown School in Providence, Rhode Island, and played college baseball at Brandeis University and the University of Pennsylvania, where he played left field briefly with future major leaguer Mark DeRosa on the 1995-96 Ivy League championship team. He graduated from Penn in 1997 with a degree in psychology.

== Medical marijuana ==
Ruby founded Theraplant as part of an effort to open a licensed medical marijuana production facility in Connecticut after that state legalized the medicine in 2012.

In September 2014, Theraplant became the first company in Connecticut to produce medical marijuana. It is currently operating in Watertown, Connecticut, and its products are available at various dispensaries throughout the state. Ruby has also joined efforts to open similar licensed facilities in Minnesota and other states.
