= Ethan Smith =

Ethan Smith may refer to:

- Ethan Smith (clergyman), writer of View of the Hebrews
- Ethan Smith (Neighbours), fictional character from the Australian soap opera Neighbours
