= Eitan =

Eitan (Hebrew: אֵיתָן) or Eytan is the Hebrew source of the male given name Ethan, and roughly translates to "strength" or "firm".

Eitan may also refer to:

== People ==
=== First name ===
- Eitan Avitsur (1941–2018), Israeli composer
- Eitan Ben Eliyahu (born 1944), Israeli general
- Eitan Berglas (1934–1992), Israeli economist
- Eitan Bernath (born 2002), American celebrity chef, entertainer, author, and TV personality
- Eitan Broshi (born 1950), Israeli politician
- Eitan Cabel (born 1959), Israeli politician
- Eitan Friedlander (born 1958), Israeli Olympic sailor
- Eitan Haber (1940–2020), Israeli journalist
- Eitan Livni (1919–1991), Israeli activist and politician
- Eitan Reiter (born 1982), Israeli musician and producer
- Eitan Tibi (born 1987), Israeli football player

=== Surname ===
- Michael Eitan (1944–2024), Israeli politician
- Or Eitan (born 1981), Israeli basketball player
- Rafael Eitan (1929–2004), Israeli general and politician
- Rafi Eitan (1926–2019), Israeli politician
- Freddy Eytan (born 1947), Israeli diplomat and writer
- Walter Eytan (1910–2001), Israeli diplomat

== Places ==
- Avnei Eitan, Israel
- Eitan, Israel
- Neve Eitan, Israel
- Eitanim

== Military ==
- IAI Eitan, an Israeli reconnaissance unmanned air vehicle
- Eitan AFV, an Israeli armoured fighting vehicle
- 2014 Israel–Gaza conflict or Miv'tza Tzuk Eitan, a military operation launched by Israel on 8 July 2014 in the Hamas-ruled Gaza Strip

== See also ==
- Ethan (disambiguation)
- Ethan (given name)
- Etan (disambiguation)
