= Ethan Allen (disambiguation) =

Ethan Allen (1738–1789) was an early American and Vermont revolutionary.

Ethan Allen may also refer to:

== People ==
- Ethan B. Allen (1781–1835), New York politician
- Ethan Allen (priest) (1796–1879), Episcopal archivist and author in Maryland, as well as minister in Ohio and Kentucky
- Ethan Allen (armsmaker) (1808–1871), American gunsmith
- Ethan Allen (baseball) (1904–1993), player and coach
- Ethan Allen (music producer), American record producer and musician

== Places ==
- Fort Ethan Allen, former U.S. Army installation and current neighborhood in Colchester, Vermont, US
- Fort Ethan Allen (Arlington, Virginia) (1861–1865), Civil War defense of Washington, D.C., US

== Ships ==
- USS Ethan Allen (1859) (1859–1865), Civil War era Union Navy 556-ton bark
- USS Ethan Allen (SSBN-608) (1960–1983), U.S. Navy ballistic missile submarine (SSBN-608)
  - Ethan Allen-class submarine (1960–1992)
- Ethan Allen, a tour boat that sank in the Ethan Allen boating accident

== Other uses ==
- Ethan Allen (horse) (1849–1876), trotting racehorse
- Ethan Allen (company), American furniture chain
- Statue of Ethan Allen, a marble sculpture depicting Ethan Allen by Larkin Goldsmith Mead
- Ethan Allen Express, a passenger train operated by Amtrak
- Ethan Allen School for Boys, a former juvenile prison in Waukesha County, Wisconsin that closed permanently in 2011

== See also ==
- Ethan (given name)
- Allen (surname)
