= Freddy Eytan =

Israeli diplomat and author (born 1947)

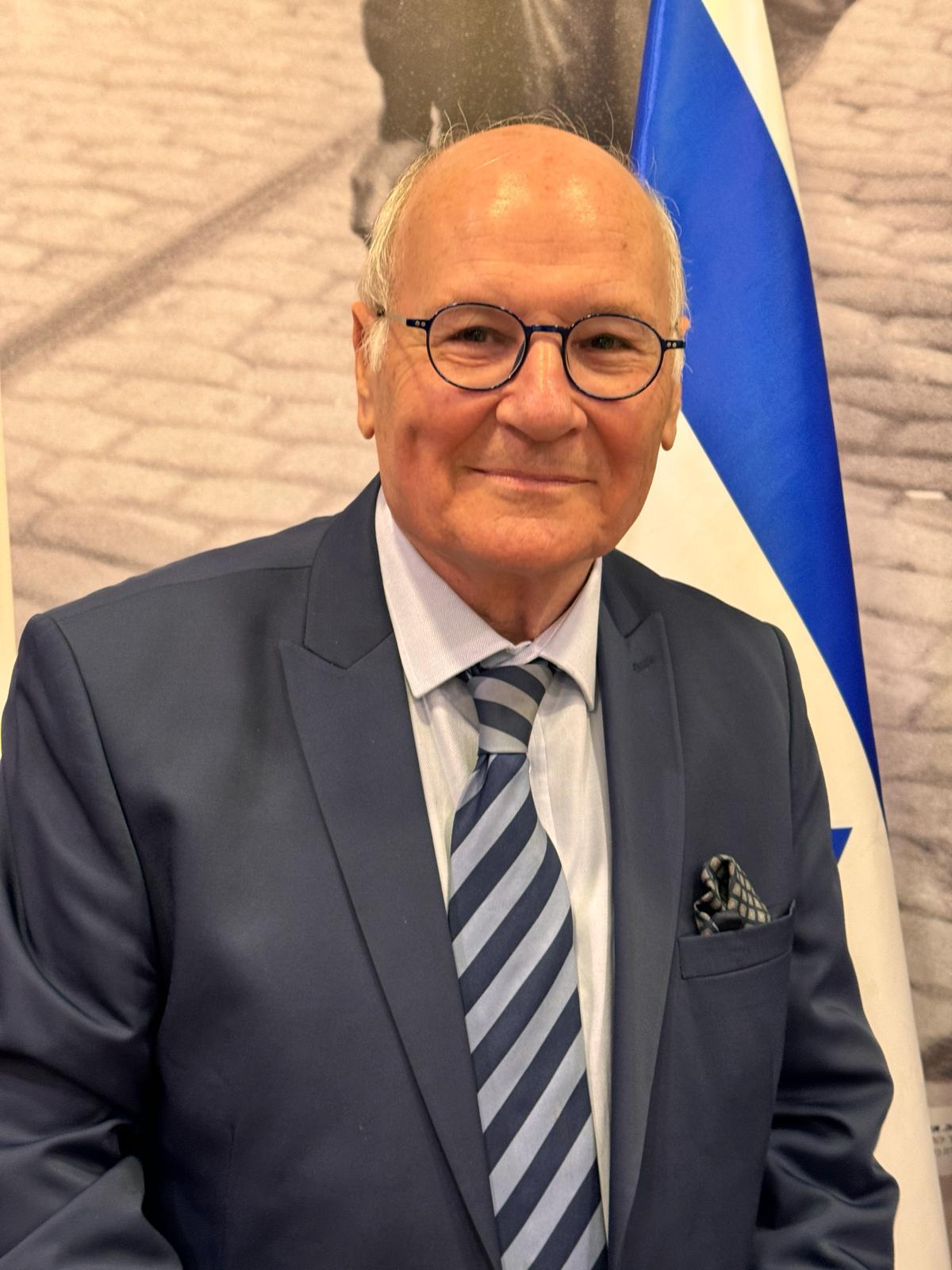
Eytan in 2024

Freddy Eytan (Hebrew: פרדי איתן; born 20 January 1947) is an Israeli diplomat, former ambassador, author and journalist.

== Early life ==
=== Family ===
Freddy Eytan's family originated in Livorno, Italy, from the early 19th century. His father, Ouzy, was an active Zionist. In November 1942, at the beginning of the invasion of Tunisia by the German army, Ouzy was arrested by the Gestapo. After four months he escaped from a camp located in the military port of Bizerte. After Liberation, he contributed to Mossad Aliyah Bet, which brought Jews to Israel. In 1956 he established, with friends, a Moshav near Megiddo called Nir Yaffe. Ouzy was the Moshav Secretary for many years and an activist in North Region for Rafi Movement (a political party affiliated with Ben Gurion). This is the Moshav where Freddy Eytan lived during his childhood.

=== Army ===
Eytan served from 1965 to 1972 in the Israeli army. After three years in the Northern Headquarters Command he became a press officer and operated under Chief of Staff Major General David Elazar. Eytan participated in battles during the Six-Day War in the Golan Heights and Northern West Bank. In 1982, he became a military correspondent and covered the first Lebanon war when the Israeli army invaded Beirut.

== Career ==
=== Journalist ===
Eytan began his career as a Galei Tsahal correspondent. He worked as the Israeli Radio and Television correspondent in Paris between 1976 and 1981. In August 1980, Freddy Eytan wrote an article in the Jerusalem Post entitled "Delayed Reaction," in which he argued that it has taken Israel five years to understand the dangerous situation that the French nuclear agreement with Iraq caused. Eytan described the nuclear reactor that Iraq was developing. Israel, according to Eytan, must act to show France the dangers of their policy. This article was written a year before Operation Opera, the attack by Israel that destroyed the Iraqi nuclear reactor in Baghdad. Between 1981 and 1989 he served as chief editor of Kol Israel Foreign News desk, covering notably the Lebanon war. He then started to work as a press officer for the Israeli Foreign Affairs Ministry in Brusells and Jerusalem. Eytan created the APEJ in Brussels which was the first bulletin Jewish press in Europe and in French. JTA was its world agency, based in NY and in English, but APEJ took their news by arrangement. Eytan also created and developed also the first Jewish radio in Europe in 1981.

Two noteworthy interviews that Eytan did were with Prime Minister Menachem Begin (before he was Prime Minister) and Moshe Dayan. In Eytan's interview with Begin, in L'aurore Begin pronounced that the U.S. administration would not favor the creation of a Palestinian state. This was during the Carter administration. Eytan interviewed Moshe Dayan the week before he died for the French newspaper Le Journal du Dimanche. The Israeli paper, Kol Hayir, called the interview a historical document. It was the last interview Dayan did before his death. The interview was designed to discuss Dayan's reaction to the assassination of Anwar Sadat, but the two also spoke about the army, politics, life and death and Dayan's own personal reflections on his life. This exclusive interview was published in Yediot Aharonot.

=== Diplomat ===
Eytan taught at Bar-Ilan University and the Hebrew University in Jerusalem. He also has been a distinguish career diplomat at the embassies in Brussels and Paris and also senior advisor to the foreign minister and spokesman for the Israeli side during peace negotiation with the Palestinians in 1996–1998.;

Between 1972 and 1976, Eytan was a diplomat in the Israeli Embassy in Paris. In 1989 Eytan became the press officer at the Israeli Embassy in Brussels and continued until 1992. In 1998 he became the first Israeli Ambassador to Mauritania with a mandate to represent Israel in all North Africa. He initially was Israel's representative in the country and when full diplomatic ties were finalized, he became its first ambassador to Mauritania. During his time in Mauritania, Eytan was instrumental in many projects aimed at strengthening diplomatic measures between the two countries. Furthermore, he strived to bring Israeli humanitarian missions to aid the people of Mauritania. One such project brought Israeli eye doctors to the country to provide care for people who otherwise would have no access to such care. Due to the lack of access to surgery, many people suffer from blindness that is caused by untreated cataracts. Israeli doctors were brought in to perform surgery on these people and prevent many conditions. According to the doctors who participated in the missions, Eytan was the "moving spirit" behind the project. After Eytan ended his term in Mauritania, Israel struggled to find a successor. However, the two countries maintained their diplomatic connections despite objections from other Arab countries.

=== Advocate ===
Since 2005, he is in charge of European Affairs at the CAPE de Jérusalem-Jerusalem Center for Public Affairs and runs its French website, Le CAPE de Jérusalem . The CAPE features political commentary and analyses on Israeli foreign affairs, the Middle East, and French foreign policy concerning Israel and the Middle East. It uses historical facts in order to present Israel's case to the French-speaking world. According to Eytan, it is important to utilize Jewish and Israeli values to explain the root of the Arab-Israeli conflict and the historical background. The information provided on the site provides a background for understanding the Israeli side and the existential problems with which it is dealing.

=== Author ===
Eytan has written many books, mostly in French, about the Arab–Israeli conflict, France–Israel relations, biographies of Ariel Sharon, Shimon Peres and Benyamin Netanyahu, Nicolas Sarkozy, and Benjamin Netanyahu. In addition, he has written numerous political analyses on the Middle East and has spoken at a vast number of forums and conferences. He has focused on the subject of defensible borders for Israel in order to create a lasting peace. His articles and interviews have been featured in The Jerusalem Post, Le Monde, Diplomatie, Israel Magazine, L'Express, Tribune Juive, the Métropolitain, the Toronto Star, the Gazette, Le Temps, and the National Post. Among the television stations that have interviewed him include TF1, BFM, TV5, i24news, France 3, France 24, and RFI.

== Analysis of French–Israeli relations ==
Eytan's analysis of French–Israeli relations and French involvement in the Middle East are based on a historical perspective. He argues that in order to understand the current situation of French policies in relation to this region, one must look back several decades to the Dreyfuss Affair, end of colonialism, Vichy France and their relations with Iran. In his article "French History and Current Attitudes," he concludes:

"Europe's colonial history is the source of its frequent obsessions with trying to solve Middle Eastern problems. That history is also behind Europe's double standards and double play. I believe that one of the Americans' great advantages in the negotiations is that their history is not burdened with the major anti-Semitism that has manifested itself for such a long time in Europe."

== Books ==
- Bibi, le réveil du faucon- Editions Alphée – 24 février 2011. ISBN 978-2-7538-0669-6.
- Sarkozy, Le monde juif et Israël – Editions Alphée Jean-Paul Bertrand- September 2009 – Paris.
- La Shoah- Editions Alphée Jean-Paul Bertrand-Paris-2010. ISBN 978-2-7538-0569-9
- Les mass medias en Israël- Paris- 1972.
- La presse française pendant la guerre de Kippour- Paris- 1974.
- David et Marianne- Alain Moreau- Paris- 1986 -ISBN 2-85209-021-X.;
- Le conflit Israélo-arabe de Balfour 1989– Jerusalem – Akademon
- La Poudrière- Cid- Bruxelles- 1990. ISBN D/1990/5786/1
- Shimon Pérès au carrefour du destin -Editions du Rocher- Paris- 1986– ISBN 2-268-02286-2.
- Keren Or – Yedioth Aharonot- Tel- Aviv- 2004– ISBN 965-511-590-9.
- La France Israël et les Arabes -Le double jeu?- Jean Picollec- Paris- 2005 – ISBN 2-86477-211-6.
- Les secrets d’un diplomate- avec Avi Pazner – Editions du Rocher- Paris- 2005 – ISBN 2-268-05352-0.
- Sharon, le bras de fer- Jean Picollec-Paris- 2006– ISBN 2-86477-221-3.
- L’autre visage d’Israël- Editions du Rocher- Paris- 2006-ISBN 2-268-05835-2.
- Sharon, a life in times of Turmoil- Studio 9- New York- 2006– ISBN 1-55207-091-3. (Originally in French, translated into English and Portuguese)
- Les 18 qui ont fait Israël – Alphée- Paris- 2007– ISBN 978-2-7538-0265-0.
- V.G, Taupe-secret à Jérusalem- Alphée- Paris- 2008– ISBN 978-2-7538-0286-5.
- Sharon O Braço de Ferro – Barcarolla – São Paulo – 2008– ISBN 978-85-98233-30-7
- Israel: Des frontières défendables pour la paix et la sécurité. Written with Dore Gold, Yaacov Amidror and Meir Rosenne. Jerusalem Center for Public Affairs – Jerusalem. ISBN 965-218-059-9
- Les revendications légitimes de l'Etat d'Israël pour une paix juste et viable – JCPA – Jerusalem 2011 – ISBN 965-218-059-9
- Les Echecs de la communauté internationale au Moyen-Orient (1916-2016) - JCPA-CAPE de Jérusalem - Jerusalem - 2016 - ISBN 978-965-218-129-9
- Cinquante ans d’activités diplomatiques pour aboutir à la paix – JCPA – Jerusalem 2017

== Reviews ==
- "...a remarkable piece of investigative journalism. Excellent portrait of Sharon. Well document and simply buzzing with revealing facts and pertinent details."

– Robert Yves Quiriconi, Associated Press (on Sharon: A Life in Times of Turmoil).

- "Explosive book."

– Journal du Dimanche on David et Marianne

- "... is wonderfully done and full of resource material... A Job well done."

– Pierre Salinger, ABC News on David and Marianne

- - A favorite book of the Radio France stations."

-Web Radio du Livre on Sharon, le bras de fer

- "Feddy Eytan asks the real questions, the book renews the passion from the beginning to the end."

-Présent quotidien de Paris

- "It clearly analyzes the subject based on much research and gives a complete picture of Israeli-French relations."

-Pierre Lurcat, France Israel Information 346, November 2009 (on Sarkozy, Le monde juif et Israël).

Eytan's books have been praised in Le Canard enchaine, Le journal du Dimanche, L'Express, the Jerusalem Post, L'Arche, Le Monde, L'Est Republican, Tribune Juive, Information Juive, Haaretz, the Canadian Jews News, the Jewish Press, Yediot Ahronot,
