= Ethan Rubinstein =

Israeli-Canadian doctor and academic

Dr. Ethan Rubinstein (Hebrew: איתן רובינשטיין; 1941 – January 29, 2015) was an Israeli-Canadian doctor and academic.

Rubinstein was born in British Palestine in 1941. He attended the trial of Adolf Eichmann in 1961 and later served in the medical corps of the Israeli army. He received his medical degree from the University of Basel in Switzerland in 1968. One of the men involved in capturing Eichmann in Argentina asked Rubinstein to participate in a similar effort to locate Josef Mengele in the 1970s; however, the effort was aborted because he and his team suspected that their source had lied, and would have possibly robbed and killed them for the bribe money they promised him.

Rubinstein received a law degree from Tel Aviv University in 1985 and then moved to Canada, eventually settling in Winnipeg. He was head of infectious diseases at the Health Sciences Centre and taught at the University of Manitoba. His research focuses included influenza, vaccination, MRSA, anthrax, and chronic pulmonary disease. He is particularly noted for his study of the H1N1 and other influenza vaccines.
