= Eytan Modiano =

Eytan H. Modiano is a professor and associate head of the Department of Aeronautics and Astronautics and associate director of the Laboratory for Information and Decision Systems at Massachusetts Institute of Technology, Cambridge, Massachusetts.

== Education and career ==
Modiano received his B.S. degree in electrical engineering and computer science from the University of Connecticut in 1986 and his M.S. and Ph.D. degrees in electrical engineering from the University of Maryland in 1989 and 1992, respectively. His Ph.D. advisor was Professor Anthony Ephremides. Between 1987 and 1992, Modiano was a Fellow with the United States Naval Research Laboratory, and after it, for a year, served as the National Research Council postdoc fellow. From 1993 to 1999, he was a designer of the communication protocols for optical networks, satellites, and Wireless technologies at the Division of Communications of MIT Lincoln Laboratory.

In 2017, Modiano was appointed as MIT Laboratory for Information and Decision Systems' Associate Director.

Modiano also serves as editor-in-chief of the IEEE/ACM Transactions on Networking and as associate fellow of the IEEE Transactions on Information Theory and IEEE/ACM Transactions on Networking.

== Awards ==
Modiano was named Fellow of the Institute of Electrical and Electronics Engineers (IEEE) in 2012 for contributions to cross-layer resource allocation algorithms for wireless, satellite, and optical networks. In 2018, he was inducted into the Academy of Distinguished Engineers.
