= Etan =

Etan (or Eitan, Eytan in Hebrew) is a male given name meaning steadfast, strong, firm, and safe, and may also refer to:

== People ==
- Etan Boritzer (born 1950), American author
- Etan Cohen (born 1974), American screenwriter
- Etan Frankel, American playwright, television writer, and producer
- Etan Ilfeld, British entrepreneur
- Etan Mintz, American rabbi, activist, and writer
- Etan Patz (1972–unknown; legally dead 2001), American disappeared person
- Etan Thomas (born 1978), American basketball player

== Other uses ==
- Etan, Iran, a village in Qazvin Province
- ETAN, the acronym of the East Timor and Indonesia Action Network

== See also ==
- Eitan (disambiguation)
- Ethan (disambiguation)
