= Ethan Lindenberger =

Teenager who received vaccinations against his parents will

- Born: September 30, 2000 (age 25)
- Occupation: Student
- Known for: Pro-vaccine activism

Ethan Lindenberger (born September 30, 2000) is an American activist known for his opposition to anti-vaccine disinformation campaigns. He received vaccinations, against his mother's wishes, on reaching the age of majority.

In November 2018, Lindenberger used Reddit to ask for help on how he should proceed to get vaccinated. Lindenberger said his mother believed in conspiracy theories about vaccines and so he had not been vaccinated as a child. Around the age of 13 years old, Lindenberger began pursuing vaccines related resources, such as Centers for Disease Control and Prevention (CDC) articles, hence deciding that after reaching adulthood he wanted to exercise his right to be vaccinated. He says his mother rejected vaccination because of unfounded fears about adverse effects of vaccines. His father however was reluctant to vaccinate younger kids instead of everyone.

His story, which involved intergenerational conflict, caught the attention of media and politicians. In March 2019, Lindenberger was invited to attend a US Senate hearing which dealt with epidemics of diseases such as measles, which can be easily prevented but are returning because of the dissemination of misleading information about vaccines.
