= Itch mite (disambiguation) =

Itch mite may refer to:

- Sarcoptes scabiei — scabies
- Psorergates ovis — sheep itch mite
- Psorobia bos — cattle itch mite
- Pyemotes herfsi — oak leaf gall mite
- Pyemotes tritici — straw itch mite
- Pyemotes ventricosus — grain itch mite
