= Brood X =

Periodical cicadas that appear every 17 years

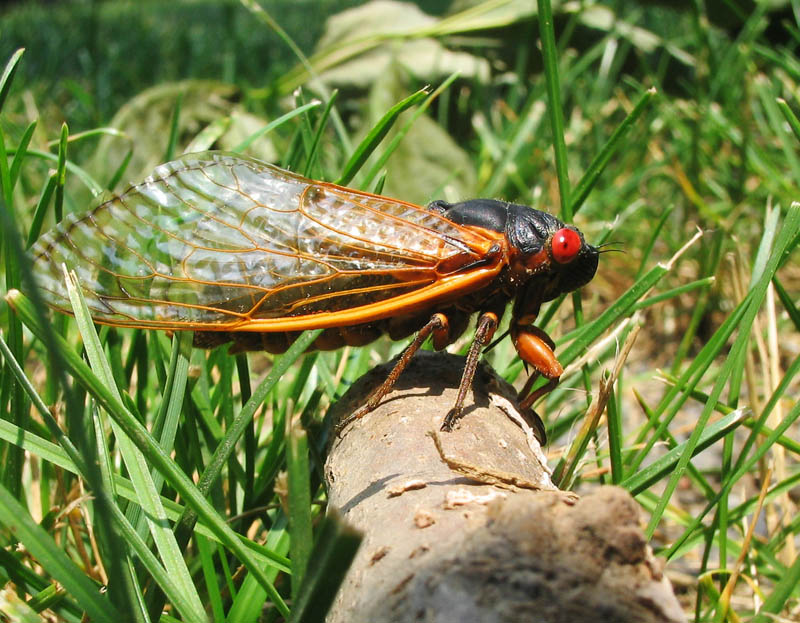
An adult Brood X cicada in Princeton, New Jersey (June 7, 2004)

Brood X (Brood 10), the Great Eastern Brood, is one of 15 broods of periodical cicadas that appear regularly throughout the eastern United States. The brood's first major emergence after 2021 is predicted to occur during 2038.

== Characteristics ==
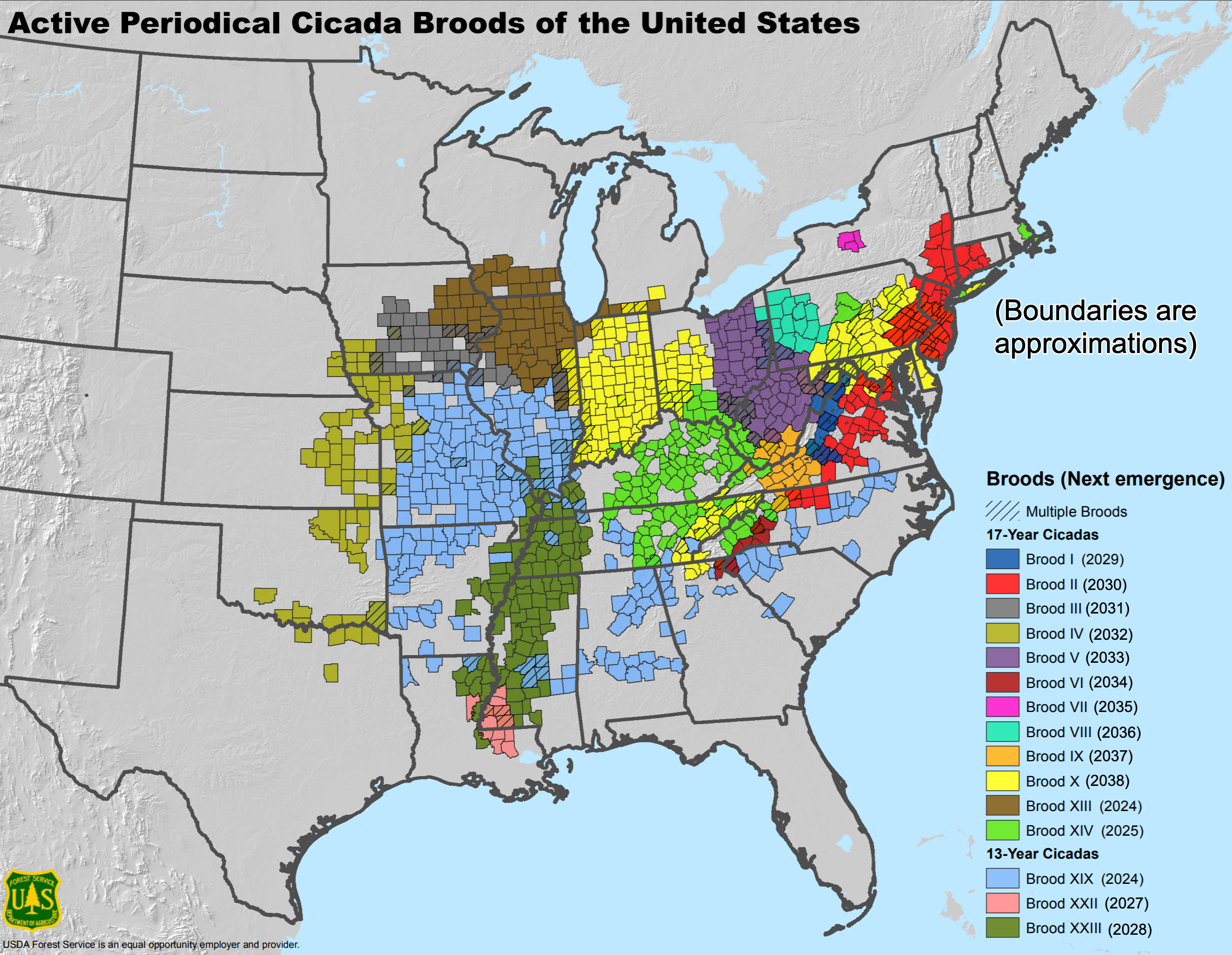
Map of periodic cicada broods with Brood X shown in yellow.

Every 17 years, Brood X cicada nymphs tunnel upwards en masse to emerge from the surface of the ground. The insects then shed their exoskeletons on trees and other surfaces, thus becoming adults. The mature cicadas fly, mate, lay eggs in twigs, and then die within several weeks. The combination of the insects' long underground life, their nearly simultaneous emergence from the ground in vast numbers and their short period of adulthood allows the brood to survive even massive predation. Brood X is endemic in Indiana, Ohio, southeastern Pennsylvania, Maryland, New Jersey, Delaware, East Tennessee, Virginia, Washington, DC, and other areas throughout the eastern United States. The brood contains three species, Magicicada septendecim, Magicicada cassini and Magicicada septendecula, that congregate on different trees and have different male songs.

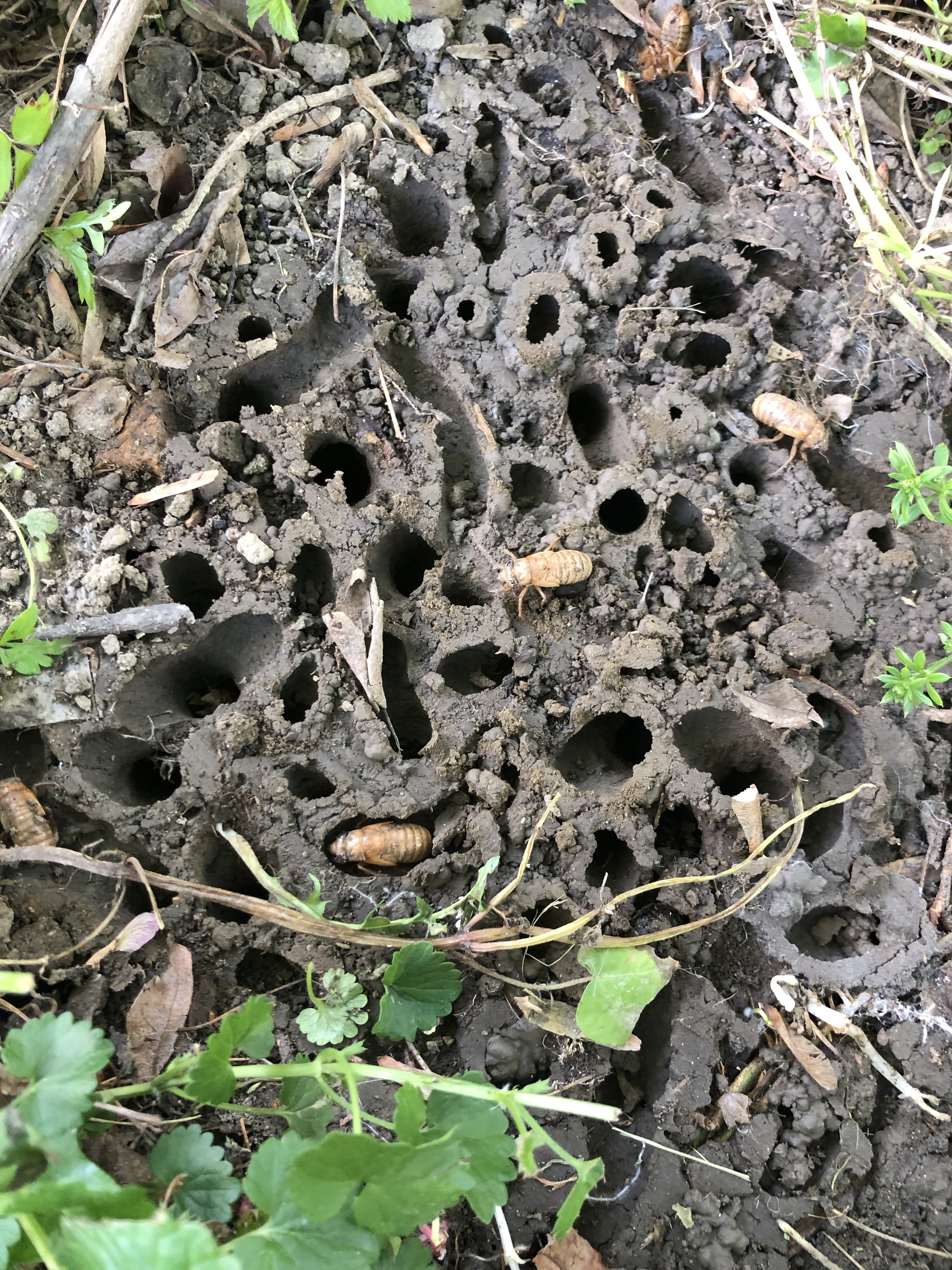
Brood X nymphs emerging in Druid Hill Park, Baltimore, Maryland (May 13, 2021)

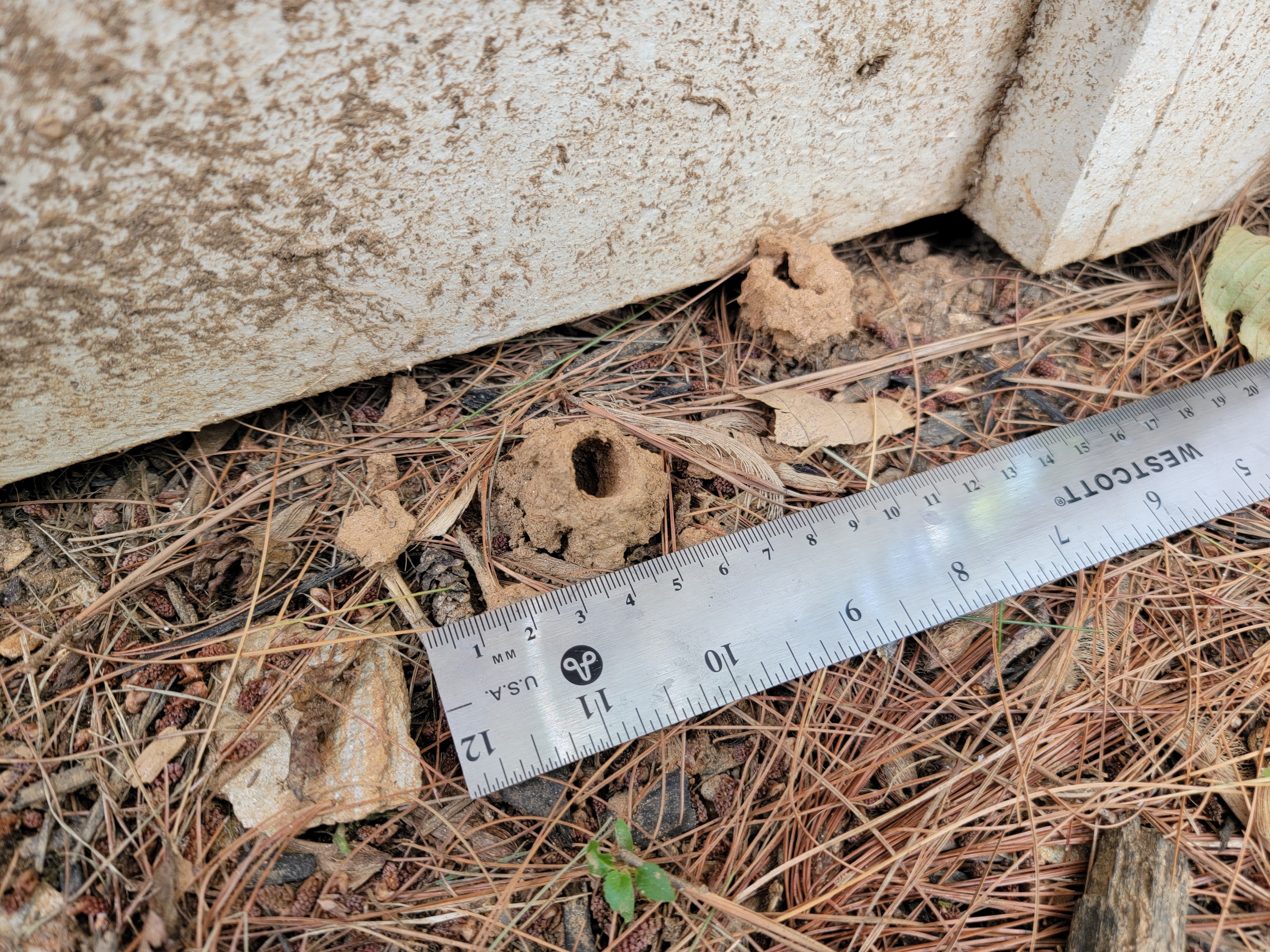
Mud turrets that emerging Brood X cicadas created in Potomac, Maryland near Washington, D.C. (June 30, 2021)

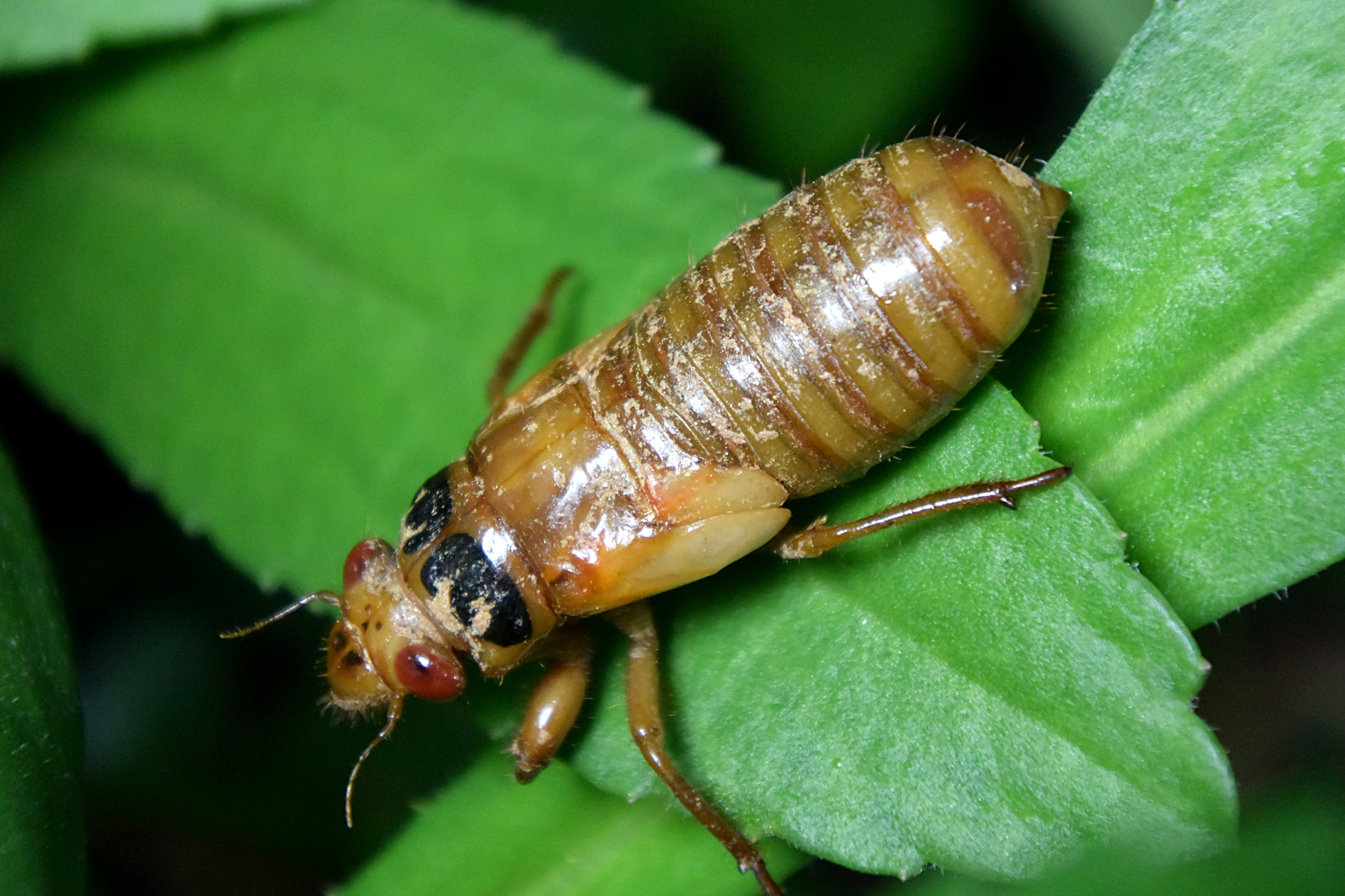
A Brood X cicada nymph in Bethesda, Maryland near Washington, D.C. (May 5, 2021)

Brood X cicada nymphs climbing a cedar tree in Bethesda, Maryland (May 25, 2021) (video)

A timelapse of two teneral Brood X cicadas molting in Bethesda, Maryland (May 17, 2021)

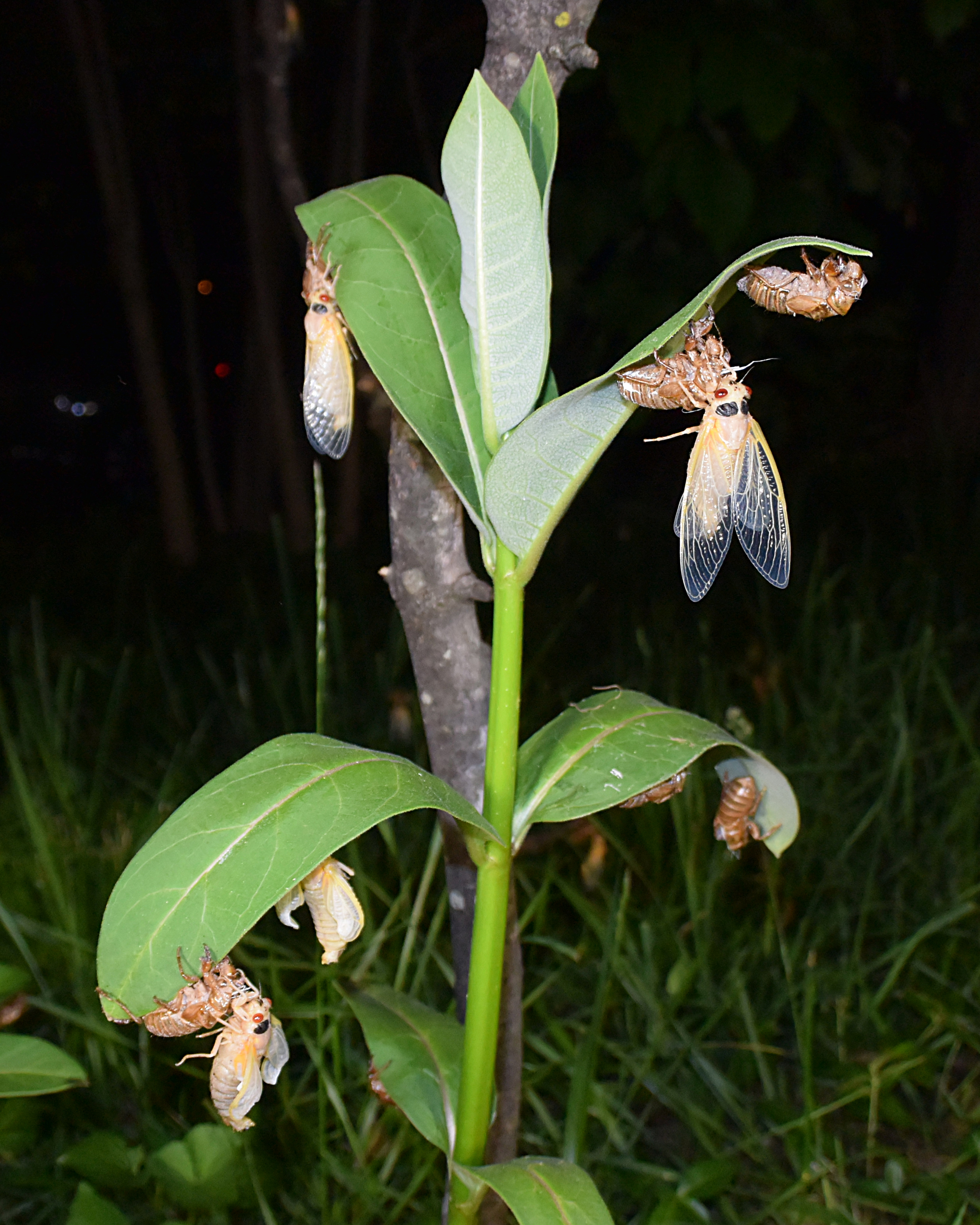
Molting Brood X cicadas on a milkweed plant in Bethesda, Maryland (May 15, 2021)

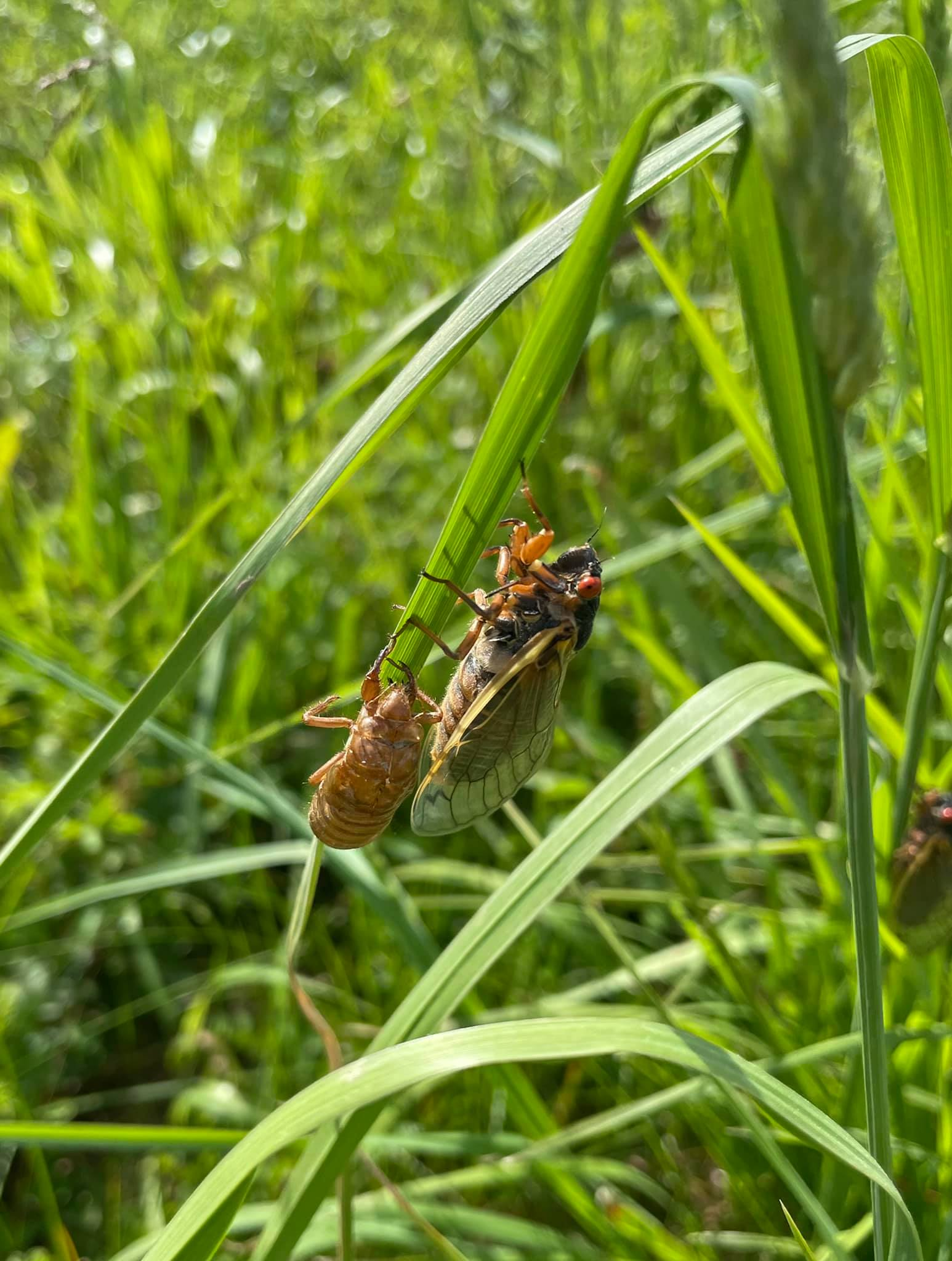
An adult Brood X cicada and exuviae in Columbus, Ohio (May 21, 2021)

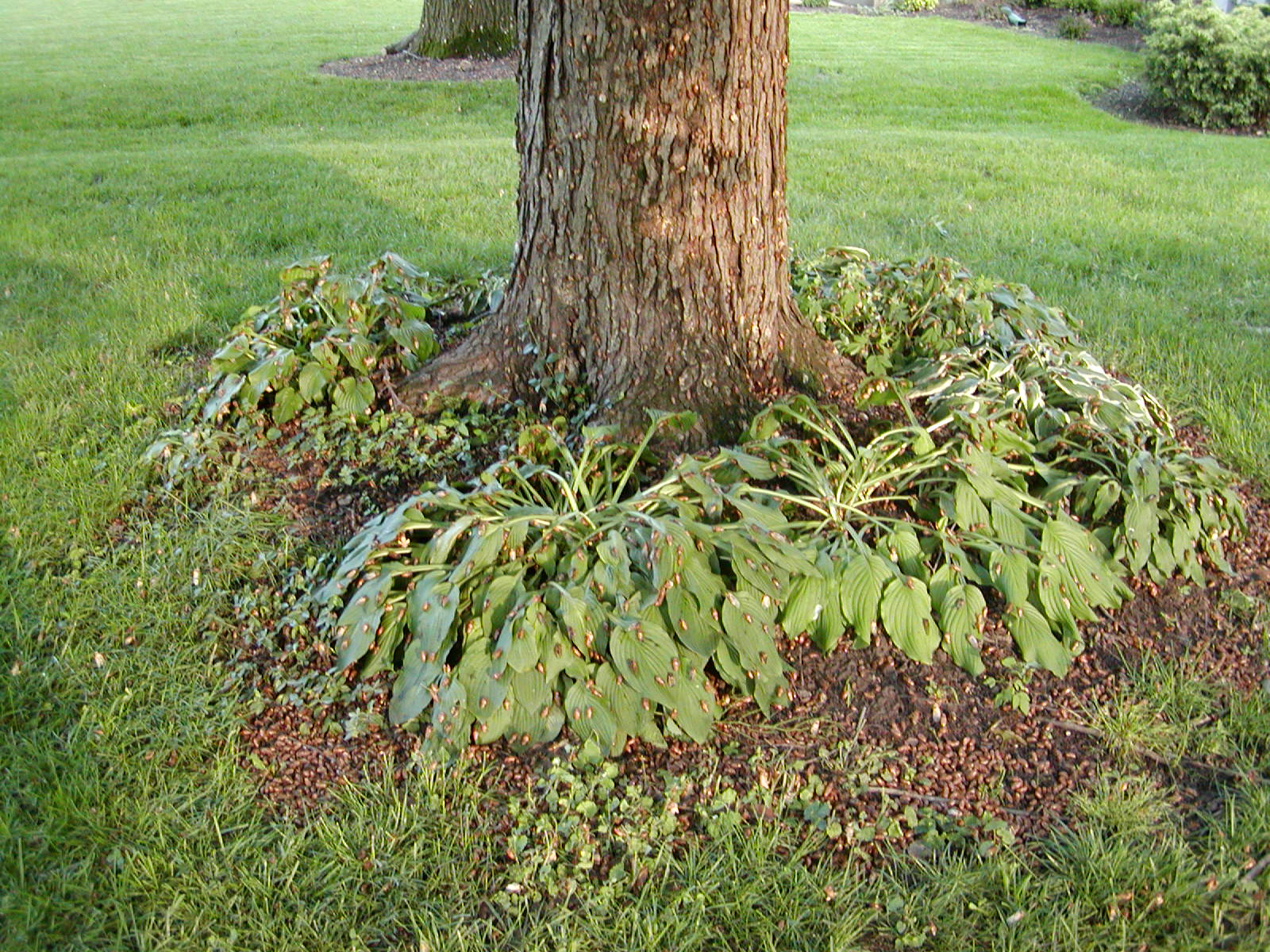
An emergent Brood X swarm and exuviae in Finneytown, Ohio near Cincinnati (May 21, 2004)

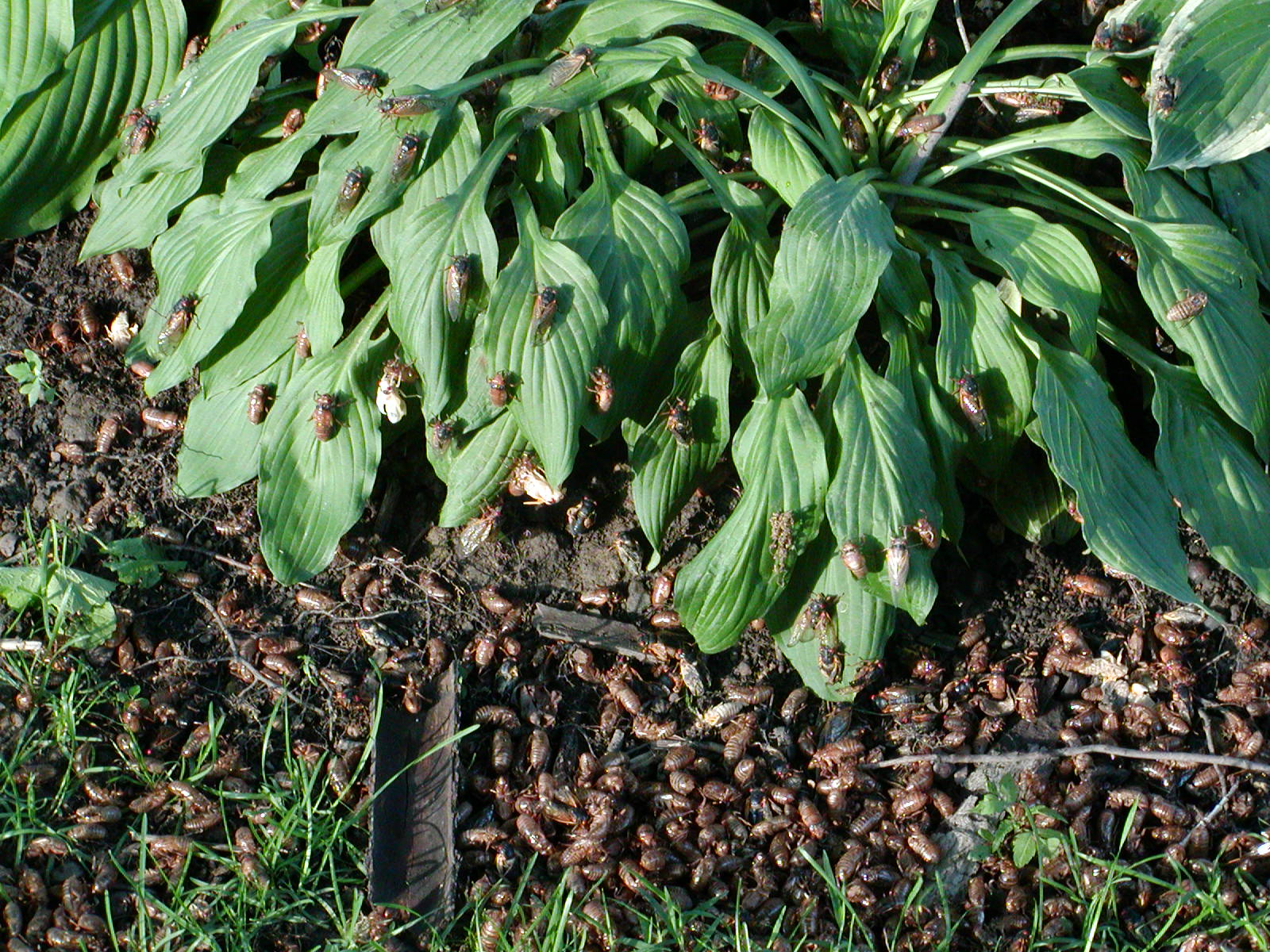
Detail of emergent swarm in Finneytown, Ohio

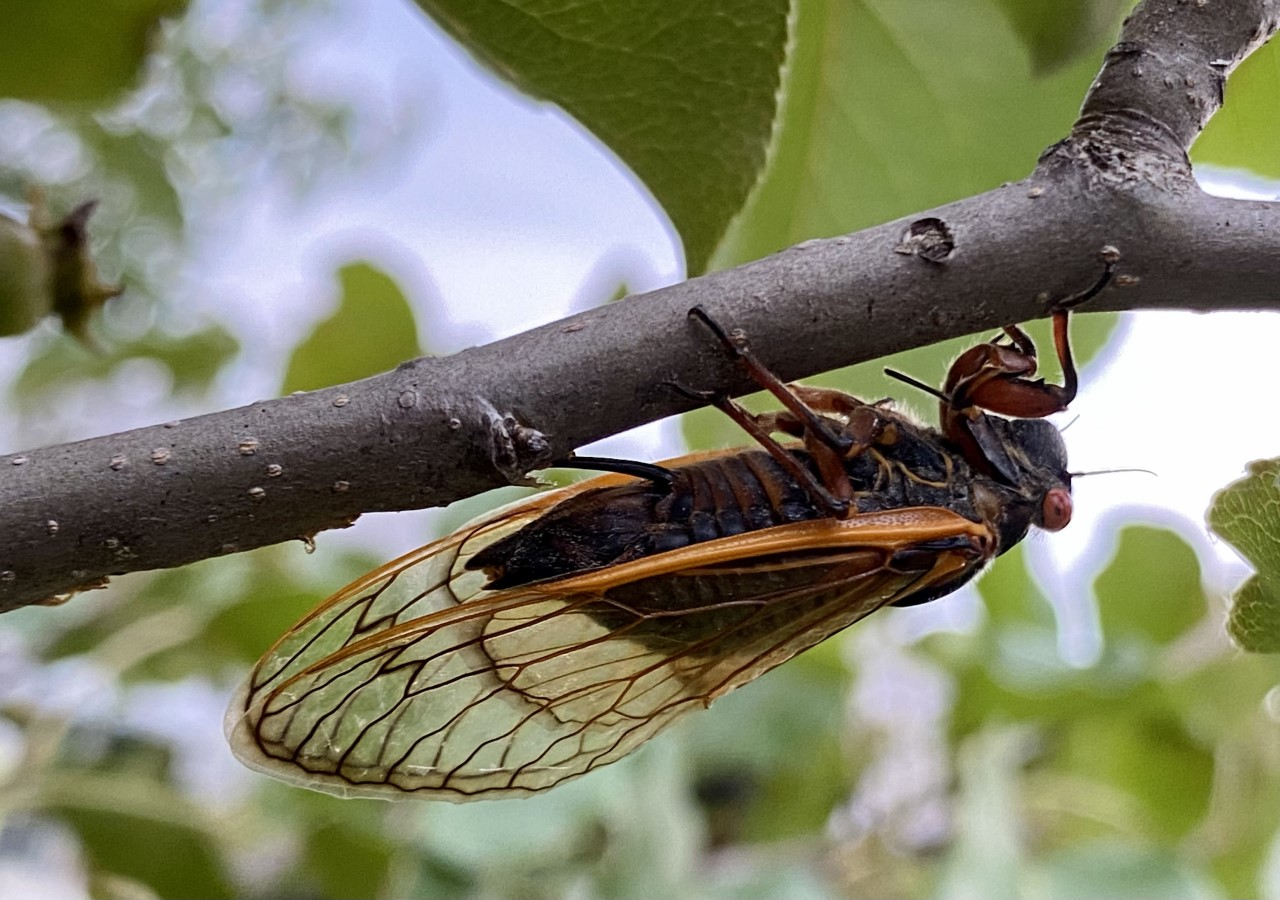
A Brood X cicada ovipositing eggs in a tree branch near Baltimore, Maryland (May 26, 2021)

== History ==
=== 1700s emergences ===
The first known description of an emergence of Brood X appeared in a May 9, 1715, entry in the journal of Rev. Andreas Sandel, the pastor of Philadelphia's "Gloria Dei" Swedish Lutheran Church. In 1737, botanist John Bartram wrote a letter that described the periodicity of the brood's emergences and his 1732 observations of the insect's insertion of their eggs into the small branches of trees northwest of Philadelphia. Bartram later recorded in greater detail within two manuscripts the brood's May 1749 emergence.

Pehr Kalm, a Finnish naturalist visiting Pennsylvania and New Jersey in 1749 on behalf of the Royal Swedish Academy of Sciences, observed in late May that year's emergence of Brood X. When reporting the event in a paper that a Swedish academic journal published in 1756, Kalm wrote:

The general opinion is that these insects appear in these fantastic numbers in every seventeenth year. Meanwhile, except for an occasional one which may appear in the summer, they remain underground.
There is considerable evidence that these insects appear every seventeenth year in Pennsylvania.

Kalm then described Rev. Sandel's report and one that he had obtained from Benjamin Franklin that had recorded in Philadelphia the emergence from the ground of large numbers of cicadas during early May 1732. He noted that the people who had prepared these documents had made no such reports in other years.

Kalm further noted that others had informed him that they had seen cicadas only occasionally before the insects emerged from the ground in Pennsylvania in large swarms on May 22, 1749. He additionally stated that he had not heard any cicadas in Pennsylvania and New Jersey in 1750 in the same months and areas in which he had heard many in 1749. The 1715 and 1732 reports, when coupled with his own 1749 and 1750 observations, supported the previous "general opinion" that he had cited.

Kalm summarized his findings in a book translated into English and published in London in 1771, stating:

There are a kind of Locusts which about every seventeen years come hither in incredible numbers .... In the interval between the years when they are so numerous, they are only seen or heard single in the woods.

Moses Bartram, a son of John Bartram, described the 1766 emergence of Brood X in an article entitled Observations on the cicada, or locust of America, which appears periodically once in 16 or 17 years that a London journal published in 1768. Bartram noted that upon hatching from eggs deposited in the twigs of trees, the young insects ran down to the earth and "entered the first opening that they could find". He reported that he had been able to discover them 10 feet (3 m) below the surface, but that others had reportedly found them 30 feet (9 m) deep.

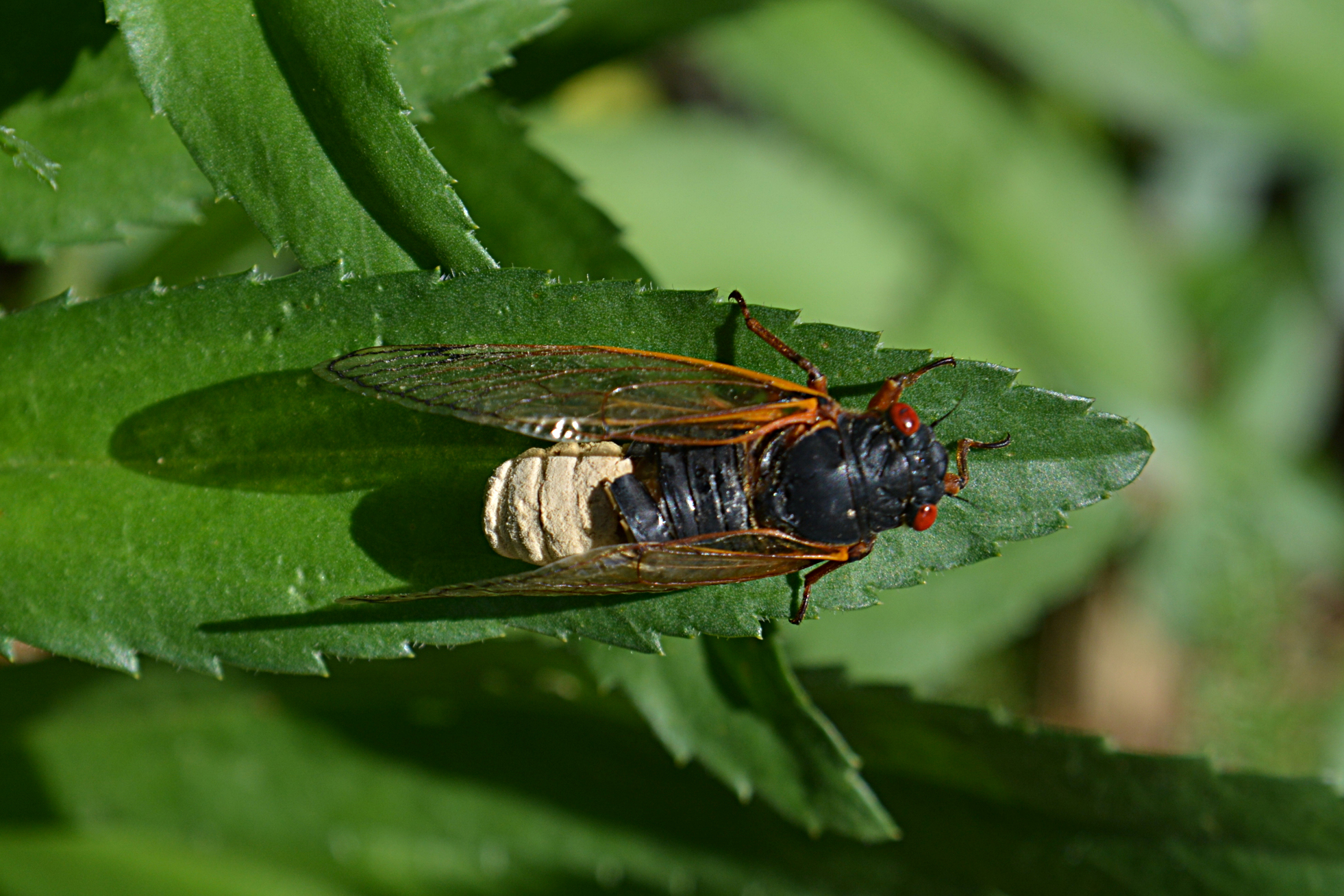
A Brood X cicada with abdominal Massospora cicadina infection in Bethesda, Maryland (May 31, 2021)

In April 1800, Benjamin Banneker, who lived near Ellicott's Mills, Maryland, wrote in his record book that he recalled a "great locust year" in 1749, a second in 1766 during which the insects appeared to be "full as numerous as the first", and a third in 1783. He predicted that the insects (Brood X) "may be expected again in they year 1800 which is Seventeen Since their third appearance to me". Describing an effect that the pathogenic fungus, Massospora cicadina, has on its host, Banneker's record book stated that the insects:

.... begin to Sing or make a noise from first they come out of the Earth till they die. The hindermost part rots off, and it does not appear to be any pain to them, for they still continue on Singing till they die.

=== 1902 emergence ===
Brood X was present in Nassau and Suffolk counties on New York's Long Island, which was the easternmost territory for the brood.

=== 1919 emergence ===
Nassau County farmers in Massapequa and Farmingdale reported cicada damage to fruit trees from the brood's emergence.

=== 1936 emergence ===
The Nassau County Farm Bureau warned drivers that the brood's emergence in the area might be heavy enough to clog radiators as the brood began to emerge in mid-June.

=== 1970 emergence ===
Long Island homeowners described the noise from Brood X as "tremendous."

=== 1987 emergence ===
Brood X was present on Long Island. A horticultural expert from New York's extension office predicted that the brood's territory on Long Island would decrease because of development.

=== 2004 emergence ===
The brood had a major emergence during the spring of 2004. The Baltimore region's emergence began around May 11 and was falling silent by June 5. Emergences began in the Washington, D.C., area and in Ohio around May 13. The D.C. area's emergence was peaking by May 21.

Long Island's population of Brood X had nearly disappeared by the time of the 2004 emergence. An entomologist with Cornell University's integrated pest management program suggested that widespread tree removal during development and pesticide use on the island had caused the brood's extirpation there.

=== 2021 emergence ===
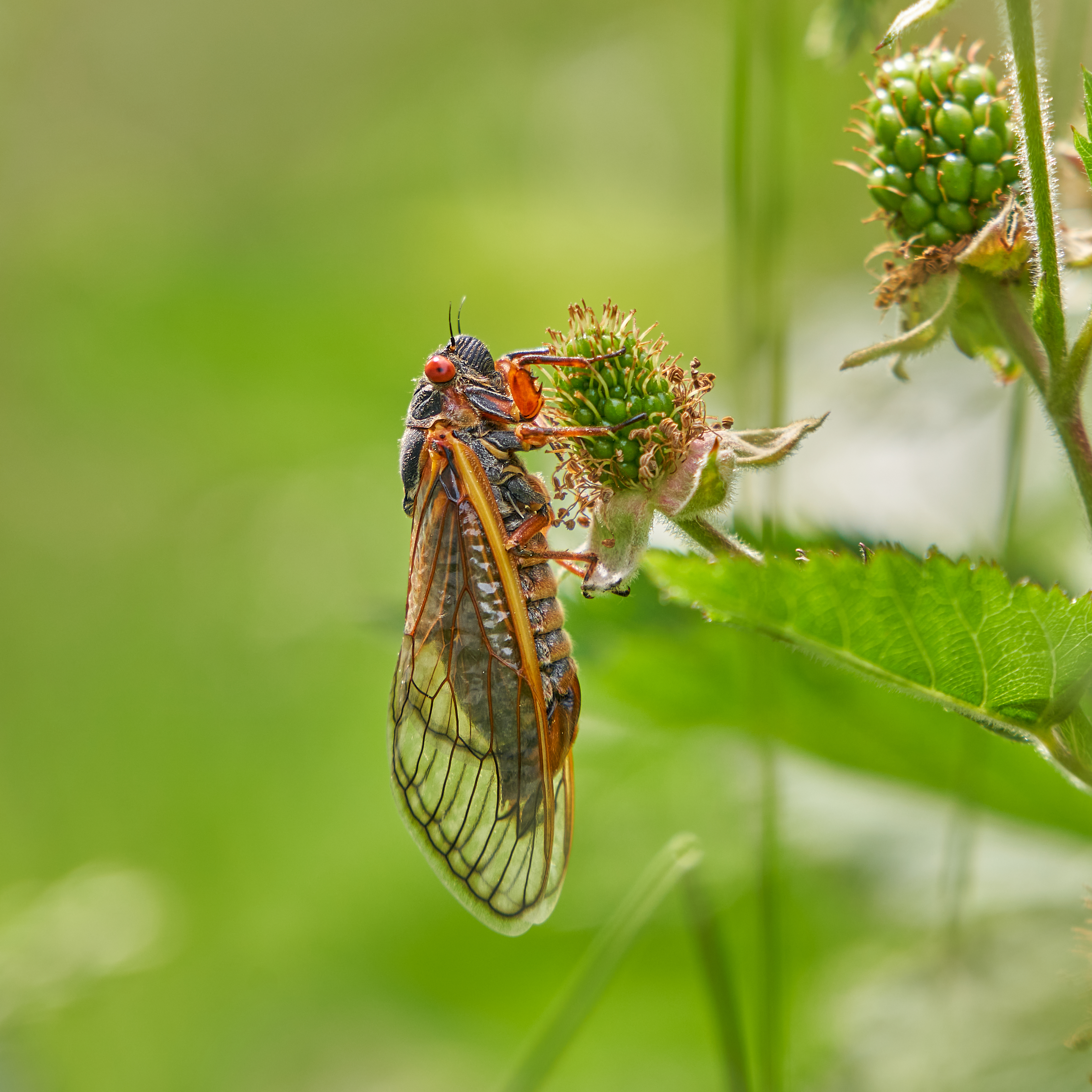
A Brood X cicada on a growing blackberry fruit near Baltimore (May 22, 2021)

The brood's 2021 expected emergence in 15 states (Delaware, Illinois, Georgia, Indiana, New York, Kentucky, Maryland, North Carolina, New Jersey, Ohio, Pennsylvania, Tennessee, Virginia, West Virginia, and Michigan), as well as in Washington, D.C., began in April. Emergent cicadas were observed in western North Carolina during mid-April.

Although a cold snap delayed emergences, more of the insects appeared as temperatures rose into the 60s. By May 6, large numbers of the insects had emerged there, while others had been reported in Maryland near Washington, D.C., and on the Tennessee-North Carolina border.

By May 7 the brood was emerging in the Philadelphia area, in Pittsburgh, and in Allentown, Pennsylvania. By May 10, people were reporting emergences in Washington, D.C., Bethesda, Maryland, Knoxville, Tennessee, Cincinnati, Detroit, Chicago and St. Louis and by May 19 in Baltimore. By May 20 the emergence was reaching its peak in Washington, D.C. and its inner suburbs. On June 8, small numbers of cicadas were heard in Connetquot River State Park Preserve in Suffolk County on New York's Long Island.

On June 8, while the press corps was preparing to cover Joe Biden's first trip abroad of his presidency, its chartered plane was grounded at Washington Dulles International Airport in Virginia after cicadas clogged the plane's auxiliary power unit. The next day, Biden swatted a cicada that had landed on his neck while he was standing on the tarmac at Joint Base Andrews in Maryland before boarding Air Force One to begin his flight to England.

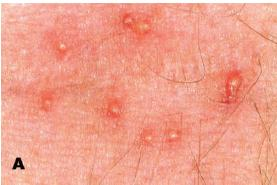
Pyemotes herfsi bites

By June 16, the population of living cicadas was declining and dead cicadas were accumulating in the Washington metropolitan area. The cicadas were gone from the Washington–Baltimore area by June 21. On July 26, the eggs that the cicadas had laid in the area were hatching.

Many reports of itchy oak leaf mite ("itch mite") (Pyemotes herfsi) bites on people's necks, shoulders and chests appeared in the Washington metropolitan area in late July and August, after the emergence had ended. The mite usually feeds on oak leaf gall midge (Polystepha pilulae) larvae and other insects, but becomes an ectoparasite of periodical cicada eggs and quickly reproduces when those are available.

=== Off-cycle emergences ===
Significant numbers of periodical cicadas, believed to be Brood X emergents that were one year and four years early, appeared in the Baltimore, Maryland–Washington, D.C. area in May 2017 and throughout the brood's range in 2000. Stragglers emerged in the Baltimore, Maryland–Washington, D.C. area in May 2025, four years after the brood's major emergence in 2021.

== Popular culture ==
During a year that Brood X emerged and Ogden Nash was living in Baltimore, The New Yorker magazine published Nash's June 12, 1936, poem Locust-Lovers, Attention!. Nash's 1938 collection I'm a Stranger Here Myself reprinted the humorous verse. His poem The Sunset Years of Samuel Pride mentions the 17–year cyclical swarms of the "locusts".

Bob Dylan's song "Day of the Locusts" from his 1970 album New Morning refers to the Brood X cicadas that were noisily present in Princeton, New Jersey in June 1970 when Dylan received an honorary degree from Princeton University.

When Brood X re-emerged in 1987, President Ronald Reagan proclaimed in a radio address: "Like the cicadas, the big spenders are hatching out again and threatening to overrun Congress." He then asked his listeners to support a balanced budget amendment and the line item veto to "make the cicadas in Congress go back underground."

Brood X next emerged in 2004. During that year's presidential election campaign, the Republican National Committee placed on the web an advertisement that compared Democratic candidate John Kerry to a periodical cicada. The ad portrayed a cicada's face changing into a picture of a confused-looking Kerry while stating:

Every 17 years, cicadas emerge, morph out of their shell, and change their appearance. Like a cicada, Senator Kerry would like to shed his Senate career and morph into a fiscal conservative, a centrist Democrat opposed to taxes, strong on defense."

Nate Powell's 2008 graphic novel Swallow Me Whole thanks "brood X cicadae of 2004" on its acknowledgments page. His book's front cover and last page contain cartoons depicting cicada swarms.

In 2015, singer-songwriter Keith M. Lyndaker Schlabach recorded the song Cicadance at the Rolling Ridge Study Retreat Community (RRSRC) near Harpers Ferry, West Virginia. The song's background contains a field recording of the sound that Brood X produced at the RRSRC during its 2004 emergence. The song, which celebrates the brood, also references the brood's most recent prior emergence in 1987.

During the brood's 2021 emergence, country singer Toby T. Swift released the novelty song Cicada Love Call in Nashville, Tennessee. The song, which Swift first wrote during the brood's 2004 emergence, compares to a cicada a woman who is trying to re-join her reluctant ex-husband after leaving him for another man 17 years earlier.

Also during the brood's 2021 emergence, singer-songwriter Sue Fink released her Cicada Suite, which contains two songs entitled Don't Berate a Cicada and Hymn of the Cicada. The first song begins with a recording of the insect's sound. Fink issued Cicada Suite on cicada-shaped flash drives.

== See also ==
- Brood II
- Brood V
- Brood XIII
- Brood XIV
