= Sign on the Window =

Song by Bob Dylan

from the album New Morning
- Released: October 1970
- Recorded: June 5, 1970
- Studio: CBS Studio B (New York)
- Length: 3:45
- Label: Columbia
- Songwriter: Bob Dylan
- Producer: Bob Johnston

"Sign on the Window" is a song by American singer-songwriter Bob Dylan. It was released on his eleventh studio album New Morning (1970). It has received positive reviews, with critics considering it a highlight of its parent album and some declaring it one of Dylan's masterpieces.

== Background and recording ==
Writer Michael Gray opines that "Sign on the Window" portrays a conflicted look towards family life, a "marked expression of explicit doubt about the family-man-countryman role" which Dylan had developed over his previous two albums. Gray highlights the repetition of the line "That must be what it's all about" as a "patently unconfident remark" which emphasizes the unease of the narrator. Brian Hinton echoes this sentiment, stating the track "certainly catches a mood of come-down at the end of the 60s dream", accentuated by a vocal performance characterized by "pathos and uncertainty".

Some writers opt for a more optimistic interpretation of the song. Robert Shelton considers the song to be "the apotheosis of personal contentment in a love relationship". Shelton notes the song's mood as "wistful contentment, free of smugness". Howard Sounes states that Dylan's voice "almost crack[s] with emotion" as he "[sings] joyfully about raising a family".

Dylan recorded five takes of the song on May 1, 1970, during a session with George Harrison, while the album version was recorded on June 5, during a session which saw eight takes of the song performed. A string arrangement by Al Kooper was created for the song, though it was omitted from the final track, a decision which Heylin states may have possibly been made in response to the negative reaction afforded to the recently-released Self Portrait (1970), which contained similar arrangements.

== Reception ==
"Sign on the Window" has received critical acclaim. Heylin considers the song an "overlooked masterpiece", with some of Dylan's "finest piano playing on record". In the biography Dylan: Behind the Shades, Heylin deems the track one of Dylan's "best songs since his Woodstock heyday of 1967". In a review of New Morning for Rolling Stone, Ed Ward called the song "the undisputed masterpiece of the album", further stating that it "ranks with the best work [Dylan has] done" and is "one of the most involved (and involving) pieces he's ever recorded".
