= Day of the Locusts =

Song by Bob Dylan

from the album New Morning
- Released: October 21, 1970
- Recorded: August 12, 1970
- Studio: Studio B, CBS Studio Building (New York)
- Length: 3:58
- Label: Columbia
- Songwriter: Bob Dylan
- Producer: Bob Johnston

"Day of the Locusts" is a song by American singer-songwriter Bob Dylan. It appears on his eleventh studio album New Morning, released on October 21, 1970. The song is Dylan's account receiving an honorary degree from Princeton University in June 1970, which occurred during a Brood X emergence of cicadas.

== Background and recording ==
"Day of the Locusts" depicts Dylan's experience of receiving an honorary doctorate from Princeton University in June 1970. Dylan was uneasy about attending the ceremony and had to be persuaded by his then-wife Sara and musician David Crosby to attend. Jim Beviglia of American Songwriter highlights the influence of gospel music in the song's chorus, while also noting the juxtaposition of "easy going, upbeat music" against the conflicted tone of the lyrics.

The recording of "Day of the Locusts" took place at Studio B in the CBS Studio Building in New York, with Dylan performing seven takes of the song on August 12, 1970. This session occurred long after much of New Morning was recorded; however, biographer Clinton Heylin suggests that the recording of the song inspired Dylan to discard the covers he had recently recorded and instead re-record "If Not for You" and "Time Passes Slowly", both of which would also appear on New Morning.

== Reception ==
"Day of the Locusts" has received positive reviews from critics. Beviglia praises the song for its "wry humor" and "surreal" lyrics.
