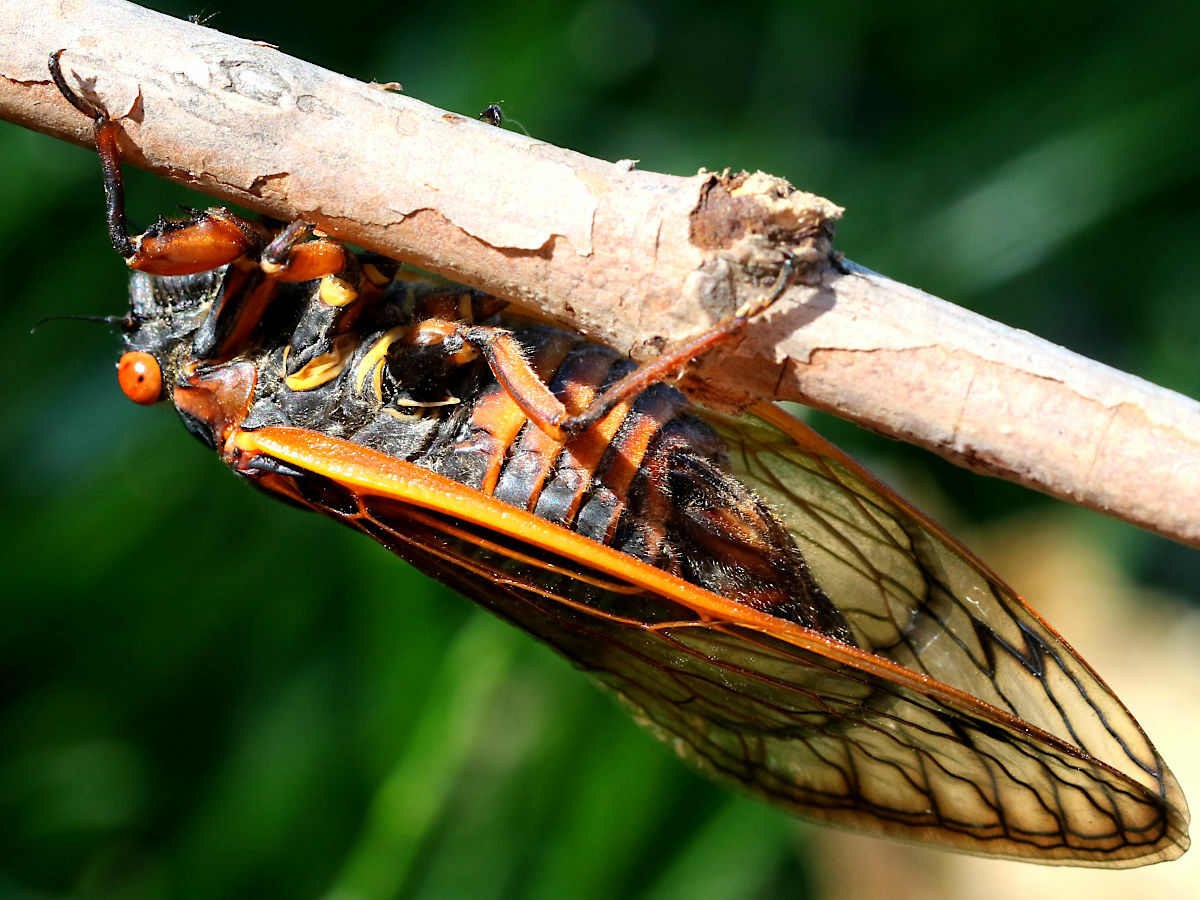
- Female
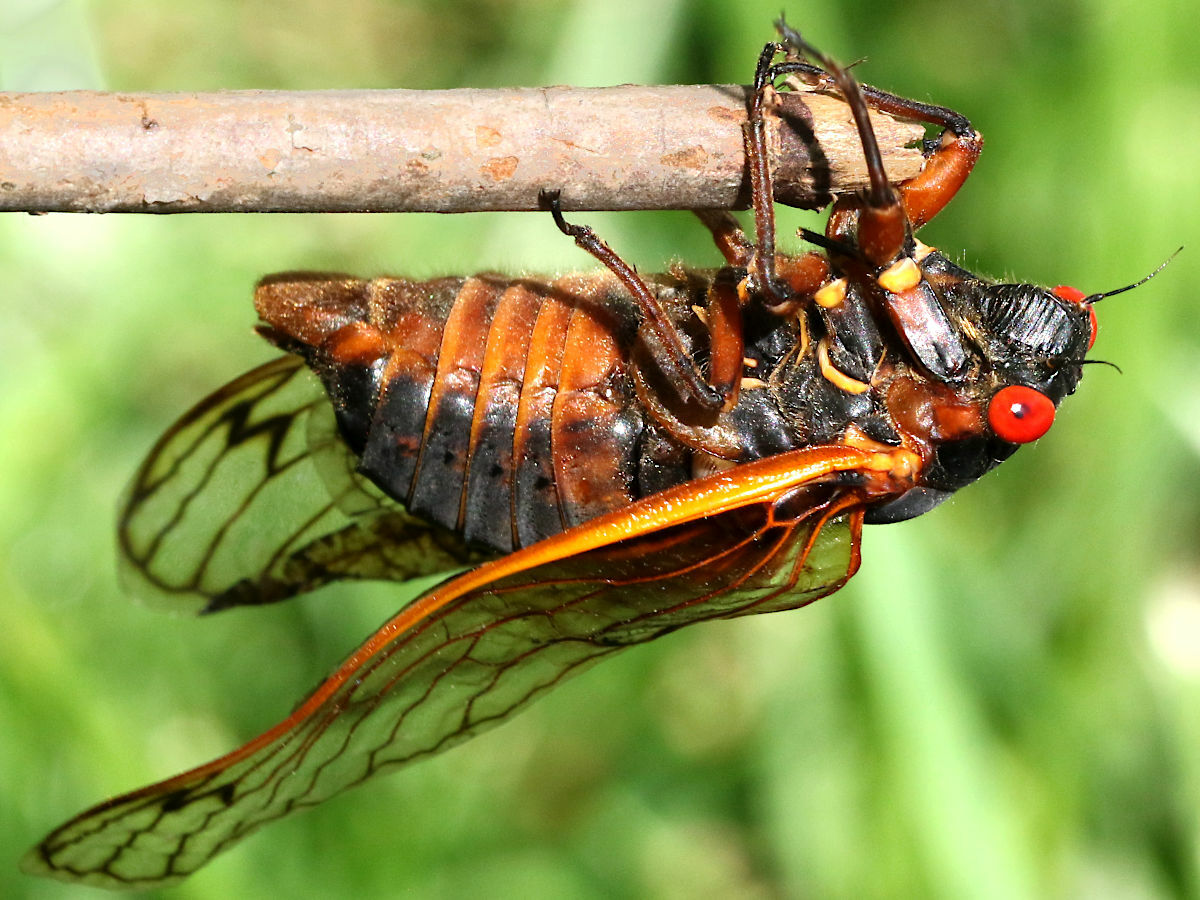
- Male

Conservation status
- Near Threatened (IUCN 3.1)

- Apparently Secure (NatureServe)

Scientific classification
- Kingdom: Animalia
- Phylum: Arthropoda
- Class: Insecta
- Order: Hemiptera
- Suborder: Auchenorrhyncha
- Family: Cicadidae
- Genus: Magicicada
- Species: M. septendecim

Binomial name
- Magicicada septendecim (Linnaeus, 1758)

= Magicicada septendecim =

Species of periodical cicada

Magicicada septendecim, sometimes called the Pharaoh cicada or the 17-year locust, is native to Canada and the United States and is the largest and most northern species of periodical cicada with a 17-year lifecycle.

== Description ==
Calling song

Distress call

Female ovipositing

Like other species included in Magicicada, the insect's eyes and wing veins are reddish and its dorsal thorax is black; it is distinguished by broad orange stripes on the underside of the abdomen and orange patches on the sides of the thorax between the eye and the forewings. Its mating call is a high-pitched song said to resemble someone calling "weeeee-whoa" or "Pharaoh", features it shares with the newly discovered 13-year species Magicicada neotredecim.

Because of similarities between M. septendecim and the two closely related 13-year species M. neotredecim and M. tredecim, the three species are often described together as "decim periodical cicadas."

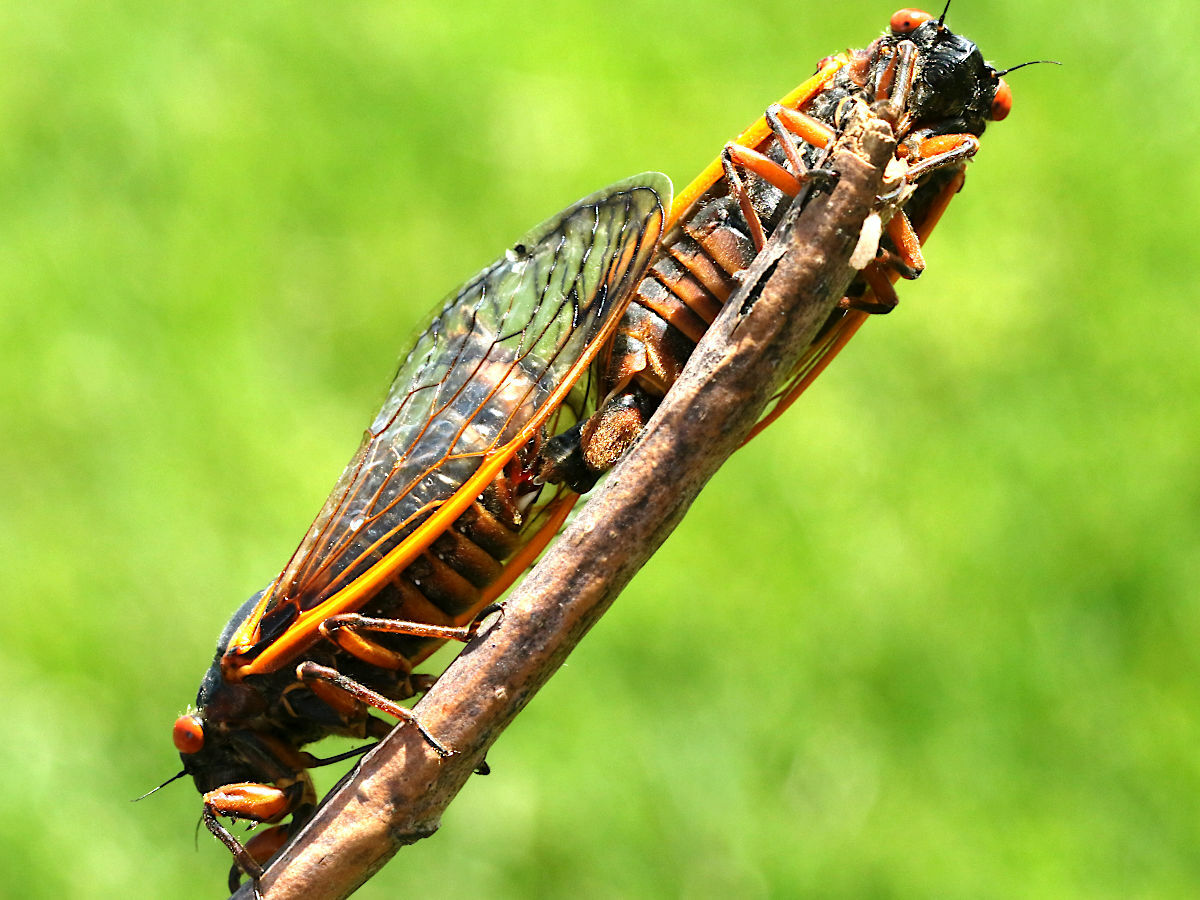
Mating pair

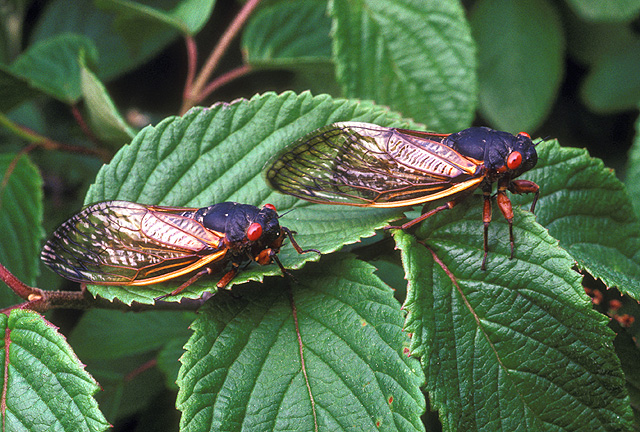
Two adults

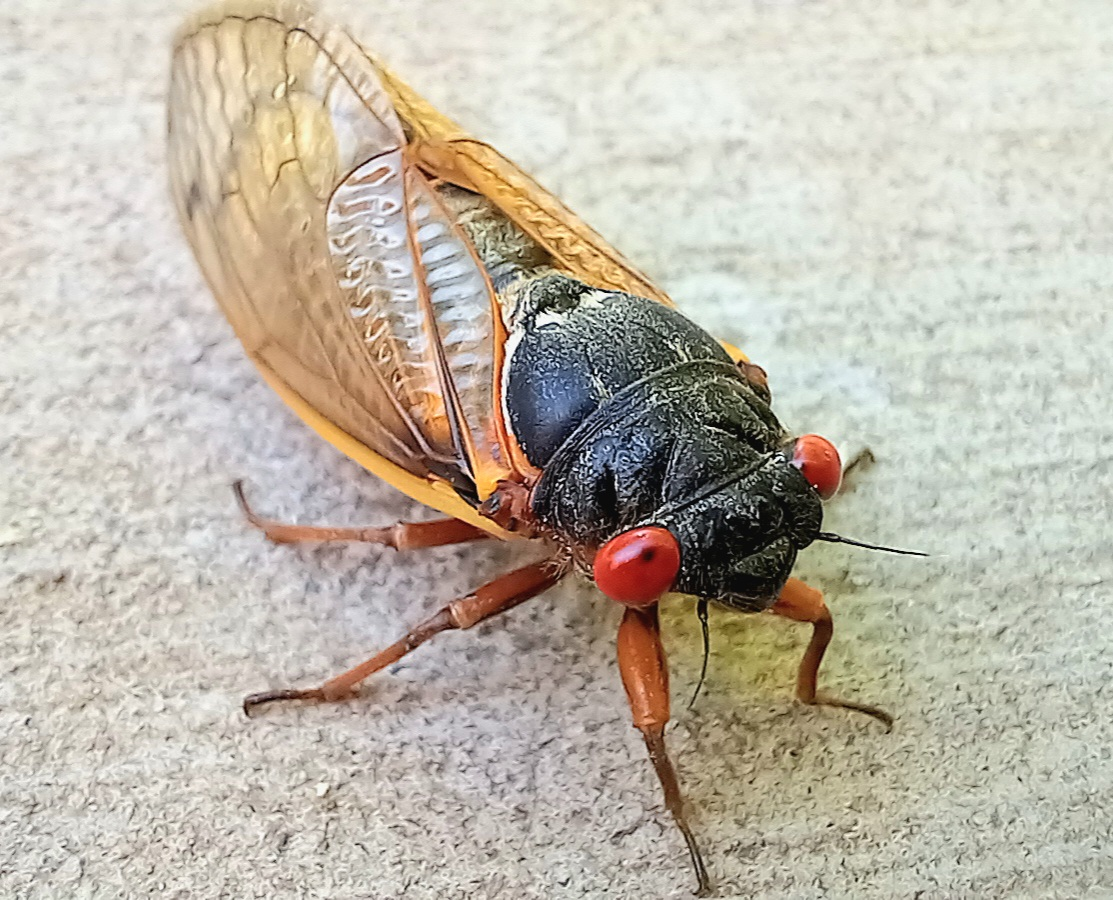
Close-up in South Carolina

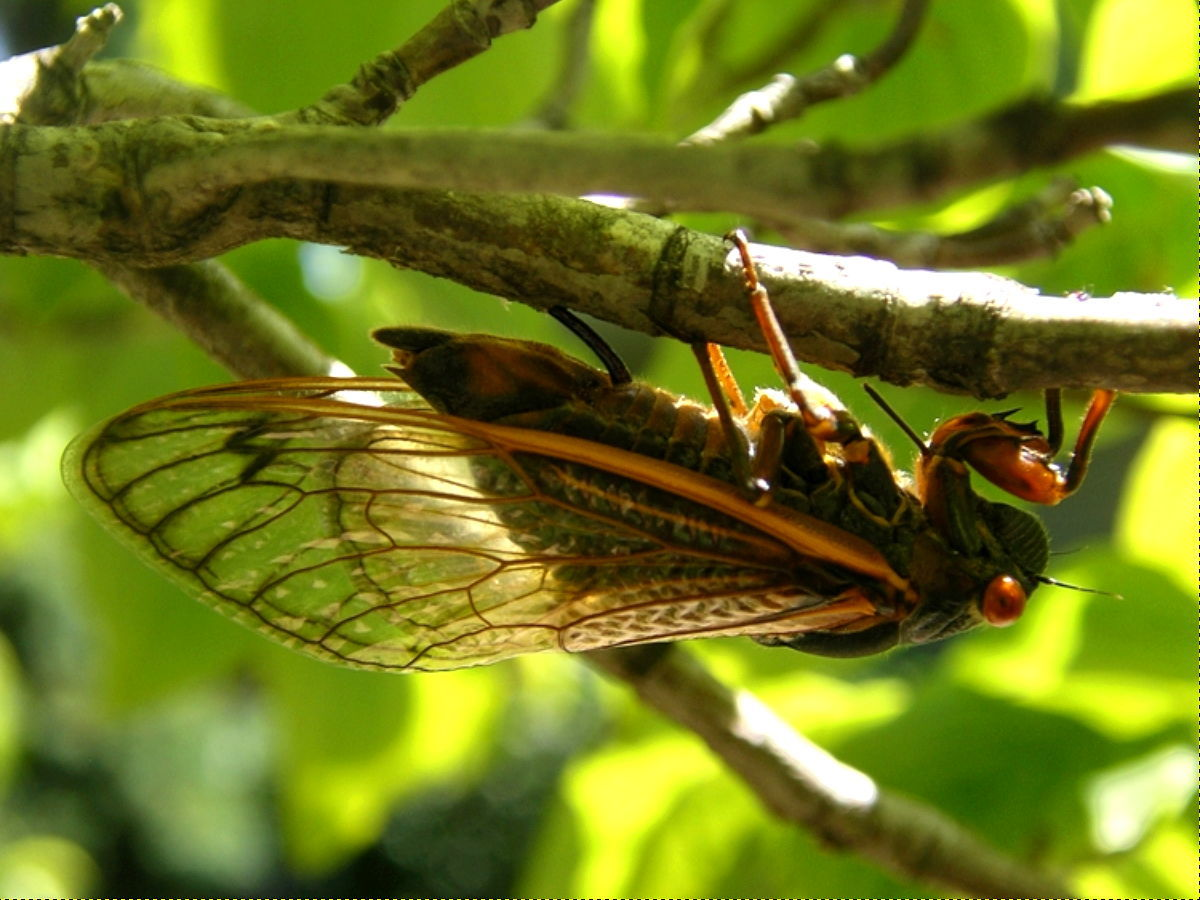
Female ovipositing

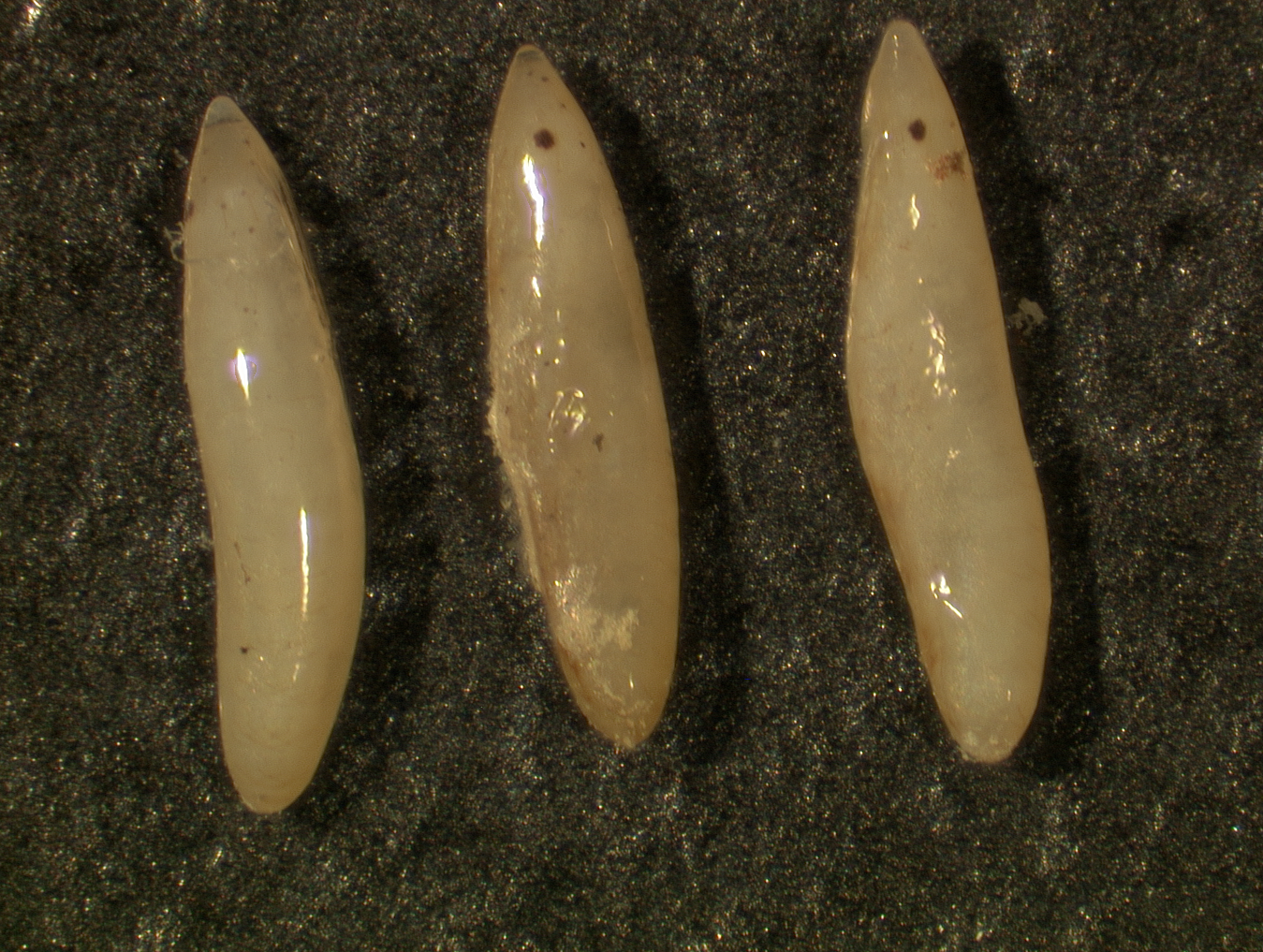
Three eggs

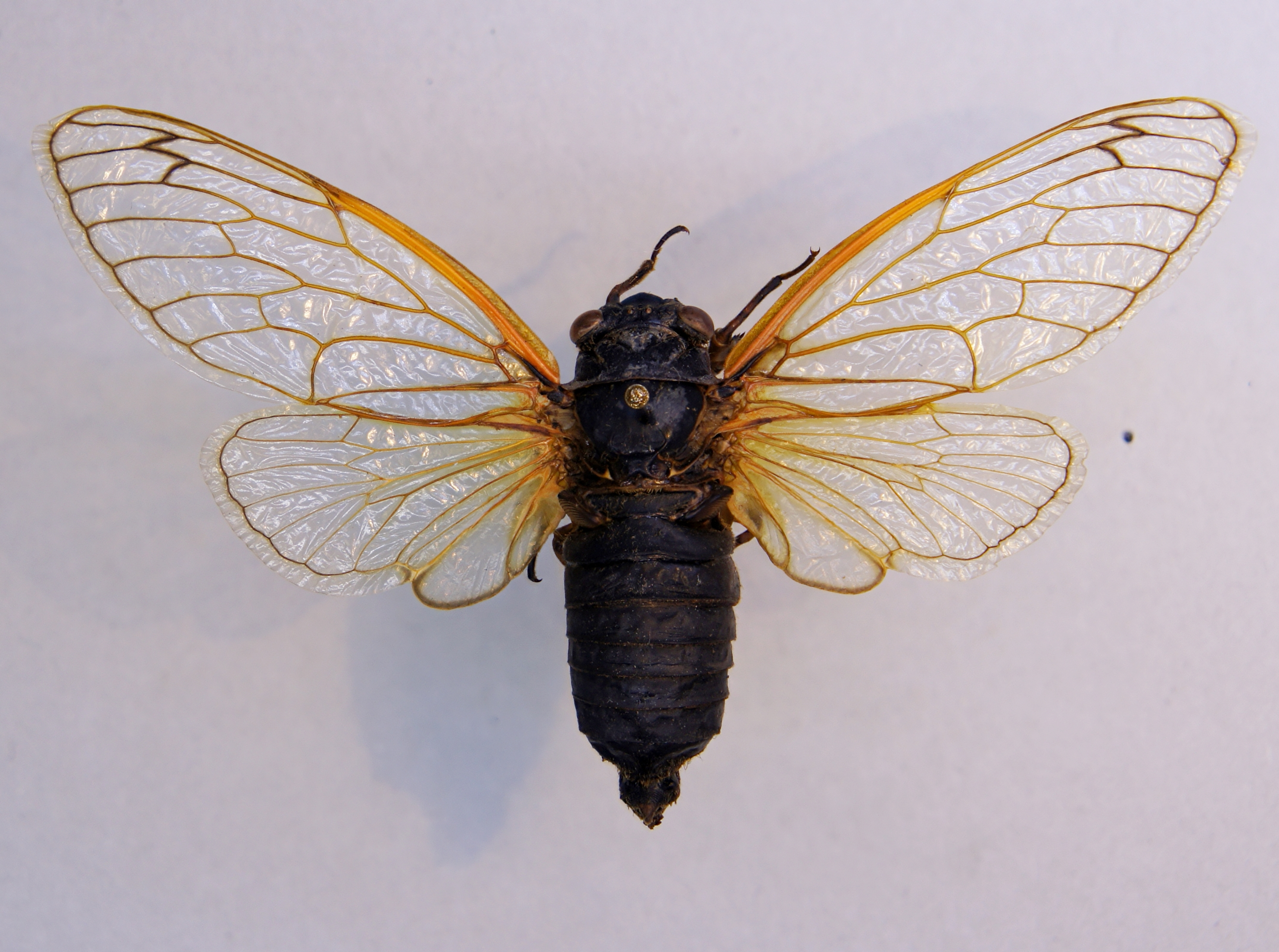
Specimen in the Bavarian State Collection of Zoology

== Life cycle ==
Their median life cycle from egg to natural adult death is around seventeen years. However, their life cycle can range between thirteen and twenty-one years.

== Historical accounts of periodicity ==
Historical accounts cite reports of 15- to 17-year recurrences of enormous numbers of noisy emergent cicadas ("locusts") written as early as 1733. John Bartram, a noted Philadelphia botanist and horticulturist, was among the early writers that described the insect's life cycle, appearance and characteristics.

On May 9, 1715, the Rev. Andreas Sandel, the pastor of Philadelphia's "Gloria Dei" Swedish Lutheran Church, described in his journal an emergence of Magicicada's Brood X. Pehr Kalm, a Finnish naturalist visiting Pennsylvania and New Jersey in 1749 on behalf of the Royal Swedish Academy of Sciences, observed in late May another emergence of that brood. When reporting the event in a paper that a Swedish academic journal published in 1756, Kalm wrote:

The general opinion is that these insects appear in these fantastic numbers in every seventeenth year. Meanwhile, except for an occasional one which may appear in the summer, they remain underground.
There is considerable evidence that these insects appear every seventeenth year in Pennsylvania.

Kalm then described Rev. Sandel's report and one that he had obtained from Benjamin Franklin that had recorded in Philadelphia the emergence from the ground of large numbers of cicadas during early May 1732. He noted that the people who had prepared these documents had made no such reports in other years.

Kalm further noted that others had informed him that they had seen cicadas only occasionally before the insects emerged from the ground in Pennsylvania in large swarms on May 22, 1749. He additionally stated that he had not heard any cicadas in Pennsylvania and New Jersey in 1750 in the same months and areas in which he had heard many in 1749. The 1715 and 1732 reports, when coupled with his own 1749 and 1750 observations, supported the previous "general opinion" that he had cited.

Kalm summarized his findings in a book translated into English and published in London in 1771, stating:

There are a kind of Locusts which about every seventeen years come hither in incredible numbers ... In the interval between the years when they are so numerous, they are only seen or heard single in the woods.

Based on Kalm's account and a specimen that Kalm had provided, in 1758 Carl Linnaeus named the insect Cicada septendecim in the tenth edition of his Systema Naturae.

In 1766, Moses Bartram described in his Observations on the cicada, or locust of America, which appears periodically once in 16 or 17 years the next appearance of the brood (Brood X) that Kalm had observed in 1749. Bartram noted that upon hatching from eggs deposited in the twigs of trees, the young insects ran down to the earth and "entered the first opening that they could find". He reported that he had been able to discover them 10 feet (3 m) below the surface, but that others had reportedly found them 30 feet (9 m) deep.

In 1775, Thomas Jefferson recorded in his "Garden Book" Brood II's 17-year periodicity, writing that an acquaintance remembered "great locust years" in 1724 and 1741, that he and others recalled another such year in 1758 and that the insects had again emerged from the ground at Monticello in 1775. He noted that the females lay their eggs in the small twigs of trees while above ground.

In April 1800, Benjamin Banneker, who lived near Ellicott's Mills, Maryland, wrote in his record book that he recalled a "great locust year" in 1749, a second in 1766 during which the insects appeared to be "full as numerous as the first", and a third in 1783 (Brood X). He predicted that the insects "may be expected again in the year 1800, which is seventeen years since their third appearance to me".
