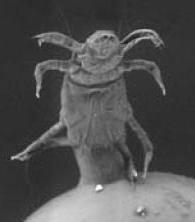

Scientific classification
- Kingdom: Animalia
- Phylum: Arthropoda
- Subphylum: Chelicerata
- Class: Arachnida
- Order: Trombidiformes
- Family: Pyemotidae
- Genus: Pyemotes
- Species: P. herfsi

Binomial name
- Pyemotes herfsi (Oudemans, 1936)

= Pyemotes herfsi =

Species of mite

Pyemotes herfsi, also known as the oak leaf gall mite or the oak leaf itch mite, is an ectoparasitic mite identified in Europe and subsequently found in India, Asia, and the United States. The mite parasitizes a variety of insect hosts and is able to bite humans, causing red, itchy, and painful wheals (welts). The mites are barely visible, measuring about 0.2–0.8 millimeters; their great reproductive potential, small size, and high capacity for dispersal by wind make them difficult to control or avoid.

== Life cycle ==
Newly emerged and mated females inject a neurotoxin-containing saliva into their hosts, which paralyzes the host and enables the gravid female mites to feed on the host's hemolymph. The posterior portion (opisthosoma) of the female enlarges as its progeny develops inside, and, within a few days, up to 250 adult mites emerge from the gravid female. Males emerge before the females, position themselves around the mother's genital opening, and mate with emerging females. Then, mated females disperse to find new hosts. These mites often are dispersed by wind, and when they land on vertebrate hosts, they attempt to feed, resulting in the bites. A life cycle can be completed within seven days, and progeny emergence can be extended to 15 days.

The mites' reported hosts have included Anobium punctatum, the pink bollworm, Grapholita molesta, Tineola bisselliella, Apis cerana (Asiatic honey bee), periodical cicadas, and various pests of stored grain, as well as humans and their pets. Their usual hosts in the United States are oak midge larvae. Cooler, more moist conditions favor its population growth. Outbreaks of attacks on humans in the United States have been attributed to fluctuations in the supply of both oak midge larvae and periodical cicada eggs.

== Distribution ==
P. herfsi has been recorded in Czechoslovakia, Egypt, Australia, northern India, and the United States. It is a regulated pest in Germany.

== Impact on humans ==
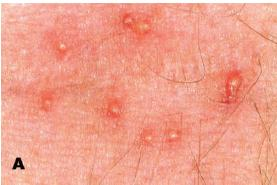
Itch mite bites

Rashes resulting from the bite of P. herfsi were first documented in Europe in 1936. The first documented outbreak in the US is thought to have occurred in 2004 in Kansas City, Kansas. The closely related straw itch mite (Pyemotes tritici) was initially suspected, but no specimens of this species were found. The reports indicated that the bites occurred on people after being outdoors in or near wooded areas. Based on this information, a search was initiated and resulted in the discovery of Pyemotes herfsi preying on midge larvae in leaf galls on pin oak trees.

The United States Centers for Disease Control estimated that during an outbreak in August 2004, 54% of the population of Crawford County, Kansas, or about 19,000 people, suffered from its bites. Other states in the U.S. where humans have been affected during the 2000s are Nebraska, Oklahoma, Missouri, Tennessee Shelby County, Texas, and Illinois. In August 2008 an outbreak was reported in the northern suburbs of Cincinnati, Ohio by the Hamilton County Public Health Department.

Many reports of itch mite bites on people's necks, shoulders and chests appeared in the Washington metropolitan area in July 2021 after an emergence of Brood X of the periodical cicada had ended. Experts attributed the bites to P. herfsi, as a report of an outbreak of bite rashes around Chicago, Illinois, during August and September 2007 had stated that the developing eggs of periodical cicadas were the only insects that the mites had parasitized in the field at the time. After emerging earlier in the year, the cicadas had laid large numbers of eggs in the terminal branches of many of the area's deciduous trees.

Humans typically report itching from mite bites within 10 to 16 hours after contact. The victims often do not recall being bitten. The rash that results from the bites is usually described as a red patch with a small blister in the center, most often found on the neck, face, arms, or upper torso. A secondary bacterial infection sometimes arises when the bite is scratched. The suggested treatments include the application of calamine lotion, an antihistamine cream such as diphenhydramine, or a topical steroid cream; a suggested preventive measure is the application of DEET before outdoor activity. Anecdotal reports from the Kansas outbreak, however, suggest that DEET might not provide complete protection against P. herfsi.

The bites are not life-threatening, but a few individuals suffering 100 or more bites have undergone brief hospitalizations.
