= Adolph B. Benson =

American scholar, educator and literary historian

Adolph B. Benson, born Adolph Berndt Bengtsson, (November 22, 1881 – November 10, 1962) was an American scholar, educator and literary historian. Adolph Benson's research focused primarily on the study of Swedish-American culture.

== Biography ==
Adolph Benson was born in Skåne, Sweden as the eldest of nine children. He emigrated to the United States during 1892 settling in Berlin, Connecticut. He graduated from Wesleyan University in Middletown, Connecticut (Bachelor's degree. 1907), (Master's degree. 1910). He taught at Columbia University, 1909–1911, at Dartmouth College 1911-1914 and at Sheffield Scientific School 1914–1920. In 1920, he became extraordinary professor of German and Scandinavian languages and literature at Yale University. He was chairman of Department of Germanic Languages at Yale University 1932–1944.

His autobiography Farm, Forge and Philosophy: Chapters of a Swedish Immigrant's Life was published by the Swedish American Historical Society in 1961.

The papers of Adolph Burnett Benson are available from Manuscripts and Archives at the Yale University Sterling Memorial Library in New Haven, Connecticut.

== Selected bibliography ==
=== Original works ===
- The Old Norse Element in Swedish Romanticism (1914)
- Sweden and The American Revolution (1926)
- An American poet-enemy of Gustavus III of Sweden (1928)
- Swedish Rarities in the Yale University Library (1935)
- Swedes in America, 1638-1938 with Naboth Hedin (1938)
- The will to succeed : stories of Swedish pioneers (1948)
- Americans from Sweden with Naboth Hedin and Carl Sandburg (1950)
- American Scandinavian studies (1952)
- Farm, Forge and Philosophy: Chapters of a Swedish Immigrant's Life (1961)

=== Translations ===
- Sara Videbeck and the Chapel, by Carl Jonas Love Almqvist; translation from the Swedish. (1919)
- America of the Fifties: Letters of Fredrika Bremer, by Fredrika Bremer; translation from the Swedish. (1924)
- Pehr Kalm's journey to North America by Pehr Kalm; translation from the Swedish. (1961)

== Other sources ==
- The Chronicle (American Swedish Historical Foundation, Spring & Summer 1956)
