= New Morning =

Studio album by Bob Dylan
- Released: October 21, 1970
- Recorded: June–August 1970
- Studio: Columbia 52nd Street (New York City)
- Genres: Country rock; folk rock
- Length: 35:21
- Label: Columbia
- Producer: Bob Johnston

Bob Dylan chronology
Self Portrait (1970)	New Morning (1970)	Bob Dylan's Greatest Hits Vol. II (1971)

Bob Dylan studio album chronology
Self Portrait (1970)	New Morning (1970)	Pat Garrett & Billy the Kid (1973)

Singles from New Morning
- 1. "If Not for You" Released: 1971

New Morning is the eleventh studio album by the American singer-songwriter Bob Dylan, released on October 21, 1970 by Columbia Records.

Coming only four months after the controversial Self Portrait, the more concise New Morning received a much warmer reception from fans and critics. Most welcome was the return of Dylan's familiar, nasal singing voice. While he has a slightly nasal tone to his voice on "Alberta #1" from Self Portrait, this was the first full album with his familiar voice since John Wesley Harding in 1967, after which he began singing with a country croon.

New Morning reached No. 7 in the United States, quickly going gold, and gave Dylan his sixth and last UK number 1 album until Together Through Life in 2009. The album's most commercially successful song is "If Not for You", which was also recorded by George Harrison, who played guitar on a version of the song released on 1991's The Bootleg Series Volumes 1–3, and was also an international hit for Olivia Newton-John in 1971.

== Details ==
Dylan discusses the recording of New Morning at length in one chapter of his autobiography, Chronicles, Vol. 1. Several alternate, preliminary forms of the album have been documented, including tracks which later appeared on the unauthorized 1973 album Dylan. He has played only four of the album's twelve songs in concert: "If Not for You", "If Dogs Run Free", the title track and "The Man in Me". "If Dogs Run Free" made its live debut on October 1, 2000, within weeks of the 30th anniversary of the album's original release.

== Recording sessions ==
New Morning was released just four months after Self Portrait and there was some speculation that it was recorded hastily and rushed out as an immediate response to the scathing criticism that surrounded Self Portrait. In fact, much of New Morning was already complete when Self Portrait was officially released.

"I didn't say, 'Oh my God, they don't like this, let me do another one,'" Dylan said in 1975. "It wasn't like that. It just happened coincidentally that one came out and then the other one did as soon as it did. The Self Portrait LP laid around for I think a year. We were working on New Morning when the Self Portrait album got put together."

During the March sessions that yielded most of Self Portrait, Dylan attempted three songs that he later rerecorded for New Morning: "Went to See the Gypsy", "Time Passes Slowly", and "If Not for You". A number of performances were recorded, but none to his satisfaction.

After work on Self Portrait was virtually completed, Dylan held more sessions at Columbia's recording studios in the Columbia Studio Building at 49 East 52nd Street in New York, beginning May 1, 1970. Held in Studio B, the first session was accompanied by George Harrison, bassist Charlie Daniels, and drummer Russ Kunkel. A large number of covers and old compositions were recorded in addition to several new compositions. The results were rejected, although "Working on a Guru" and alternate versions of "Time Passes Slowly" and "If Not for You" have since been released.

Sometime in the spring of 1970, Dylan became involved with a new play by poet Archibald MacLeish. A musical version of The Devil and Daniel Webster was titled Scratch. "New Morning", "Father of Night" and others were all written for the production. Though Dylan enjoyed talking with MacLeish, he was never confident about writing songs for the play. "Archie's play was so heavy, so full of midnight murder, there was no way I could make its purpose mine," he would later write.

Eventually, a conflict with the producer over "Father of Night" prompted Dylan to leave the production, withdrawing his songs in the process. Al Kooper, who is credited as co-producer of New Morning, would later say that these three songs were "pretty much the fulcrum for [New Morning]... That got him writing a little more."

The next session for New Morning would not be held until June 1. By this time, Dylan had written several new songs, including "Three Angels", "If Dogs Run Free", "Winterlude", and "The Man in Me".

Dylan vacated Studio B and moved into Studio E, both of which were in the Columbia Studio Building, where he stayed for the remaining sessions. For five straight days, ending on June 5, Dylan recorded most of New Morning; he even recorded a number of covers with the intention of including a few on New Morning. The June 1 session was devoted entirely to covers, but Peter La Farge's "Ballad of Ira Hayes" was the only one given any serious consideration for inclusion. The June 2 session produced a solo piano rendition of "Spanish Is the Loving Tongue"; Al Kooper felt it was a strong candidate for New Morning, but it was ultimately set aside. Jerry Jeff Walker's "Mr. Bojangles" and the traditional "Mary Ann" were also recorded on June 2, with "Mr. Bojangles" receiving serious consideration for inclusion.

On June 9, several days after those initial June sessions, Dylan accepted an honorary doctorate in music from Princeton University. Dylan did not enjoy the experience, and it inspired him to write a new song, "Day of the Locusts".

Weeks later, a session held on June 30 was dedicated to recording new versions of "Blowin' in the Wind", but those recordings were left on the shelf.

Bob Johnston was still credited with production, but by July he was absent and would not return. Instead, Dylan and Kooper created the preliminary sequence for New Morning. The process was wrought with frustration, possibly the result of the negative criticism over Self Portrait. The first sequence of New Morning included a few covers as well as a new version of "Tomorrow Is a Long Time", an original composition dating back to 1962.

Meanwhile, Kooper convinced Dylan to record orchestral overdubs for "Sign on the Window" and "New Morning". An overdub session was held on July 13, but Dylan left those overdubs out of the final mix. These alternate mixes would later appear on Volume 10 of The Bootleg Series. Kooper then convinced Dylan to record overdubs for versions of "Spanish Is the Loving Tongue", "If Not for You" and "Went to See the Gypsy". That overdub session was held on July 23, but Dylan would ultimately reject these recordings.

"When I finished that album I never wanted to speak to him again," Kooper said. "I was cheesed off at how difficult [the whole thing was]...He just changed his mind every three seconds so I just ended up doing the work of three albums...We'd get a side order and we'd go in and master it and he'd say, 'No, no, no. I want to do this.' And then, 'No, let's go in and cut this.'... There was another version of 'Went to See the Gypsy' that was really good... It was the first time I went in and had an arrangement idea for it and I said, 'Let me go in and cut this track and then you can sing over it.' So I cut this track and it was really good... and he came in and pretended like he didn't understand where to sing on it."

Dylan ultimately decided to re-record "If Not for You" and "Time Passes Slowly", holding one final session on August 12. During that session, he also recorded "Day of the Locusts", which by now had been finished. For the album's final sequencing, these three recordings were placed at the beginning of New Morning, while covers of "Ballad of Ira Hayes" and "Mr. Bojangles" were dropped.

While New Morning neared completion, Dylan and his manager, Albert Grossman, formally dissolved their business relationship on July 17, 1970. Grossman retained certain rights from previous agreements, including royalties on work produced under his management, but their publishing company, Big Sky Music, would be replaced by Ram's Horn Music before the end of 1971, putting an end to any joint ownership in publishing. Dylan would gain complete control over his personal management and his own music publishing.

== Songs ==
=== "If Not for You" ===
The album opens with "If Not for You", which was also recorded for George Harrison's album All Things Must Pass released a few months after this album. A sincere, sentimental love song with modest ambitions, it was Dylan's only single from New Morning. The song was later covered by Olivia Newton-John and was also the title song of her first album in 1971.

=== "Day of the Locusts" ===
"Day of the Locusts" is Dylan's account of receiving an honorary degree from Princeton University in June 1970. David Crosby was present, and later commented: "Sara was trying to get Bob to go to Princeton University, where he was being presented with an honorary doctorate. Bob did not want to go. I said, 'C'mon, Bob it's an honor!' Sara and I both worked on him for a long time. Finally, he agreed. I had a car outside, a big limousine. That was the first thing he didn't like. We smoked another joint on the way and I noticed Dylan getting really quite paranoid about it. When we arrived at Princeton, they took us to a little room and Bob was asked to wear a cap and gown. He refused outright. They said, 'We won't give you the degree if you don't wear this.' Dylan said, 'Fine. I didn't ask for it in the first place.'...Finally we convinced him to wear the cap and gown."

The song's lyrics refer to Brood X of the 17-year periodical cicada (often misidentified as "locusts"), whose sounds blanketed Princeton at the time of his visit:

"Sure was glad to get out of there alive.
And the locusts sang such a sweet melody.
and the locusts sang with a high whinin' trill,
Yeah, the locusts sang and they was singing for me..."

In a 2008 interview with the Aspen Institute, Crosby revealed that a line in the song, "The man next to me, his head was exploding", was in reference to Crosby's presence during the event.

=== "Time Passes Slowly" ===
This is another deceptively simple song where Dylan appears to sing the praises of stability and stasis. There is some sense with lyrics like "ain't no reason to go anywhere" and "time passes slowly and fades away" that maybe Dylan is not as satisfied with inaction as he appears on the surface. "Time Passes Slowly" is one of a few songs on New Morning originally written for Archibald MacLeish's play Scratch. An alternate version of the song featuring George Harrison's guitar playing and harmony vocal appears on The Bootleg Series Vol. 10: Another Self Portrait (1969–1971).

=== "Went to See the Gypsy" ===
It is often assumed that Dylan wrote "Went to See the Gypsy" after meeting Elvis Presley, as the song mentions visiting with a mysterious and important man in a hotel. The song also contains the line, "A pretty dancing girl was there, and she began to shout... 'He did it in Las Vegas, and he can do it here.' This lyric was seen by some as a reference to Presley's record-breaking run of performances in Las Vegas (his series of concerts at the International Hotel commenced on July 31, 1969). The meeting described in the song may have been purely imaginary, however, as Dylan clarified in a 2009 interview with Rolling Stone's Douglas Brinkley: "I never met Elvis, because I didn't want to meet Elvis... I know The Beatles went to see him, and he just played with their heads." In the same interview, Dylan expanded upon his imagined mythical image of the singer: "Elvis was truly some sort of American king. Two or three times we were up in Hollywood, and he had sent some of the Memphis Mafia down to where we were to bring us up to see Elvis. But none of us went... I don't know if I would have wanted to see Elvis like that. I wanted to see the powerful mystical Elvis that had crash-landed from a burning star onto American soil." In the final lines of the song, Dylan makes mention of a "little Minnesota town", a rare reference to his own childhood in Hibbing.

=== "Winterlude" ===
"Winterlude" verges on satirical, a humorous love song directed at a girl named Winterlude, and includes the chorus, "Winterlude, this dude thinks you're fine". The song was featured in The Comic Strip's 1998 special "Four Men in a Car".

=== "If Dogs Run Free" ===
"Winterlude" is followed by "If Dogs Run Free", a beat jazz paean, featuring scat-singing Maeretha Stewart as a guest vocalist and Al Kooper on piano.

=== "New Morning" ===
The title track of New Morning is another one of the lighter tracks, a wry take on country life. "New Morning" is another song initially written with the idea for use in Archibald MacLeish's play Scratch, though none of Dylan's songs were ultimately used in the play.

=== "Sign on the Window" ===
"Sign on the Window" expands on the joyous sentiments found in "New Morning", applying it to domestic bliss. "Beginning hesitantly, the last verse of 'Sign on the Window' builds towards its repeated last line not as a forced projection of false hope but as simple, matter-of-fact acceptance of middle-age sentiment," writes music critic Tim Riley. "[These words] offer a way of redefining one's values that doesn't mean copping out or giving up. The antithesis of the family man, at thirty a father of four, begins broaching homeliness without irony—and still convinces you not to hear it as strict autobiography."

Guitarist Ron Cornelius recalls, "Dylan had a pretty bad cold that week. You can hear it on ['Sign on the Window'], y'know, that bit about 'Brighton girls are like the moon,' where his voice really cracks up. But it sure suits the song. His piano playing's weird...because his hands start at opposite ends of the keyboard and then sorta collide in the middle—he does that all the time—but the way he plays just knocks me out."

=== "One More Weekend" ===
A blues-influenced song in the key of A major. "One More Weekend" is ostensibly a simple paean to the idea of a loving couple taking a weekend getaway. Some observers see more complex undertones however - the references to 'weasel on the run' and 'coming and going like a rabbit in the wood' give some sense that all is not as it seems.

=== "The Man in Me" ===
In "The Man in Me", "Dylan surrenders to the person he sees when his lover looks through him," writes Riley. "He's not trying to impress this lover, so the title hook resonates enough to carry things... 'Take a woman like you to get through/To the man in me' is so direct in its expression of the unflinching cues of intimacy, you forgive him the occasional forced rhyme." The song was later featured during several scenes in the 1998 Coen Brothers film The Big Lebowski.

=== "Three Angels" ===
"Three Angels" is gospel-tinged track limning sights on an urban street, including "a man with a badge", a "U-Haul trailer", and "three fellas crawling their way back to work". A reference to the 'Tenth Avenue bus going west' gives an indication that the song is likely set in New York City. The atmosphere of the song is reminiscent of the recitations recorded by Hank Williams as Luke the Drifter.

=== "Father of Night" ===
The final song, "Father of Night", is Dylan's interpretation of the Jewish prayer Amidah. In 1973, the song was covered by Manfred Mann's Earth Band for the album Solar Fire. At 1 minute 32 seconds, "Father of Night" is Dylan's shortest song from a studio-released album.

== Reception ==
Professional ratings
Review scores
Source	Rating
AllMusic	4.5/5 stars
Chicago Tribune	3/4 stars
Christgau's Record Guide	A−
Encyclopedia of Popular Music	3/5 stars
Entertainment Weekly	B
MusicHound Rock	2.5/5
PopMatters	6/10
The Rolling Stone Album Guide	4/5 stars
Tom Hull	B+

Several critics were quick to praise New Morning as a return to form after Self Portrait. Ralph J. Gleason of Rolling Stone heralded the release with a headline declaring "WE'VE GOT DYLAN BACK AGAIN!" and described the album as "beautiful". Reviewing for the same publication, Ed Ward echoed this sentiment and deemed it a "superb album". Ward lauded "Went to See the Gypsy" and "Sign on the Window" as "masterpieces"; he said that the former was "the hardest rocker from Dylan in a 'coon's age", with the singer's voice "back in its raspy, rowdy glory", while the latter "ranks with the best work he's done", including "Sad-Eyed Lady of the Lowlands", "Just Like Tom Thumb's Blues" and "Like a Rolling Stone". He also praised Dylan's piano playing and concluded by calling New Morning "one of Dylan's best albums, perhaps his best".

Stereo Review's Noel Coppage said it was not only Dylan's best LP but "the best album I've heard in years" and "for all practical purposes, an album without a flaw". He called the musical arrangements "exemplary" and agreed with those who recognized "Time Passes Slowly" as "the best song Dylan ever wrote", saying that it was "the new anthem for Dylan's people ... It points toward open country and toward family instead of community." Geoffrey Cannon of The Guardian found New Morning a departure from all of the artist's previous albums and commented on the range of styles and influences while highlighting Dylan's "dynamite piano". He described the title track as "a marvellous song, pointing to all our best hopes" in its celebration of the simple pleasures of nature and the senses.

Other commentators disagreed that the album marked Dylan's full artistic return. According to biographer Howard Sounes, these more dispassionate listeners found it "a little self-satisfied" and, further to Nashville Skyline and Self Portrait, evidence of the singer's descent into commercialism and conservative values. The NME's Richard Green said the record fell short of the high expectations created in the build-up to its release and by the high quality of his past work; he wrote that "much of it is standard pop that would be totally neglected if any other artist had done it." Green admired the rock-oriented tracks and predicted that, while the LP would be a big seller, it would "not go down as one of Bob Dylan's best efforts". Morgan Ames of High Fidelity wrote that Dylan remained an intermittently interesting songwriter, but he was no longer "a Force in the way he once was and everyone knows it". Conceding that he had never liked Dylan's singing, Ames said New Morning was not an album he would revisit and that, but for the legend surrounding Dylan, it would have been received as merely "a competent, if not inspired, offering from a country-oriented folksinger-writer".

Village Voice critic Robert Christgau named New Morning the seventh best album of 1970. In comparing the record to Self Portrait, he later wrote: "this time he's writing the pop (and folk) genre experiments himself, and thus saying more about true romance than is the pop (or folk) norm." Christgau highlighted "Winterlude" and "If Dogs Run Free", but panned "Three Angels" and "Father of Night", saying they "make religion seem dumber than it already is".

In his contemporaneous review for The Times, Richard Williams wrote that New Morning showed Dylan left behind by recent trends and "a newer generation finds it hard to understand what the fuss is about". Writing for Rough Guides, Nigel Williamson says that music historian Sean Egan "astutely" summarized the issue when he commented: "[Dylan's] music was no longer an elemental thing ... his world view was limited to the end of the driveway of the home that his wife baked in and his children caroused through." Williamson calls New Morning a "fine album" but, despite the excitement of Dylan's supporters at Rolling Stone, "more of a false dawn".

== Track listing ==
All tracks are written by Bob Dylan.

Side one
No.	Title	Recorded	Length
1.	"If Not for You"	August 12, 1970	2:39
2.	"Day of the Locusts"	August 12, 1970	3:57
3.	"Time Passes Slowly"	August 12, 1970	2:33
4.	"Went to See the Gypsy"	June 5, 1970	2:49
5.	"Winterlude"	June 5, 1970	2:21
6.	"If Dogs Run Free"	June 5, 1970	3:37
Total length:			17:56

Side two
No.	Title	Recorded	Length
1.	"New Morning"	June 4, 1970	3:56
2.	"Sign on the Window"	June 5, 1970	3:39
3.	"One More Weekend"	June 3, 1970	3:09
4.	"The Man in Me"	June 5, 1970	3:07
5.	"Three Angels"	June 4, 1970	2:07
6.	"Father of Night"	June 5, 1970	1:27
Total length:			17:25

== Personnel ==
- Bob Dylan – vocals, piano (on "Day of the Locusts", "Time Passes Slowly", "Went to See the Gypsy", "Winterlude", "Sign on the Window", "The Man in Me" and "Father of Night"), acoustic guitar, electric guitar, organ, harmonica
- David Bromberg – electric guitar, Dobro
- Harvey Brooks, Charlie Daniels – bass guitar
- Ron Cornelius, Buzz Feiten – electric guitar
- Al Kooper – organ, piano, electric guitar, French horn
- Russ Kunkel, Billy Mundi – drums
- Hilda Harris – backing vocals
- Albertine Robinson – backing vocals
- Maeretha Stewart – backing vocals on "If Dogs Run Free"

Technical

- Bob Johnston – production
- Len Siegler – photographer

== Charts ==
=== Weekly charts ===
Weekly chart performance for New Morning
Chart (1970–1971)	Peak position
Australian Albums (Kent Music Report)	4
Dutch Albums (Album Top 100)	3
Norwegian Albums (VG-lista)	8
Spanish Albums Chart	9
Swedish Albums (Kvällstoppen)	4
UK Albums (Official Charts)	1
US Billboard 200	7

=== Year-end charts ===
Year-end chart performance for New Morning
Chart (1971)	Position
Dutch Albums (Album Top 100)	58

== Certifications ==
Region	Certification	Certified units/sales
United States (RIAA)	Gold	500,000^{^}
^{^} Shipments figures based on certification alone.
