= Pyemotes =

Pyemotes Temporal range: Palaeogene–present

Scientific classification
- Kingdom: Animalia
- Phylum: Arthropoda
- Subphylum: Chelicerata
- Class: Arachnida
- Order: Trombidiformes
- Family: Pyemotidae
- Genus: Pyemotes; Amerling, 1861

Synonyms
- Heteropus Newport, 1850; Pediculoides Targioni Tozzeti, 1878

Genus of mites

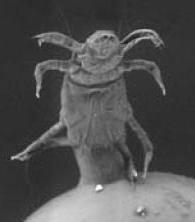
Pyemotes herfsi

Pyemotes is a genus of mites.

It is divided into scolyti and ventricosus groups.

It includes the species:

- Pyemotes dryas
- Pyemotes herfsi
- Pyemotes scolyti
- Pyemotes tritici
- Pyemotes ventricosus
