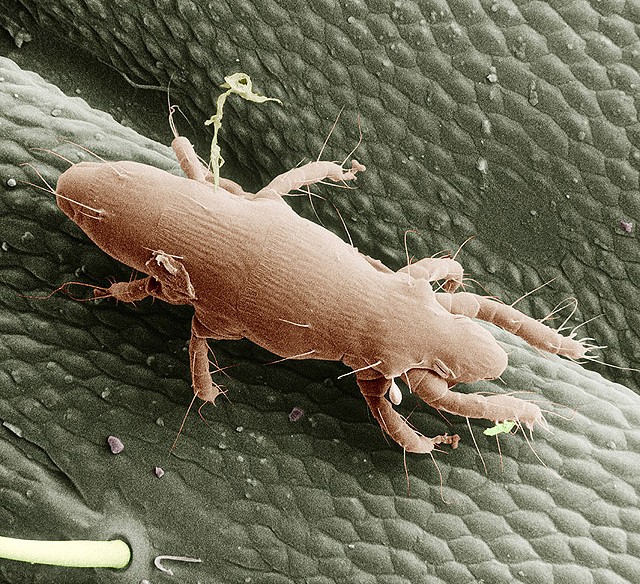
- Pyemotes tritici

Scientific classification
- Kingdom: Animalia
- Phylum: Arthropoda
- Subphylum: Chelicerata
- Class: Arachnida
- Order: Trombidiformes
- Superfamily: Pyemotoidea
- Family: Pyemotidae; Oudemans, 1937 (1897)

= Pyemotidae =

Family of mites

Pyemotidae is a family of mostly parasitic mites that feed on the larvae and other developmental stages of various insects but some species are herbivorous or fungivorous.

== Characteristics ==
Members of this family are elongated, cylindrical mites with a large gap between the front two pairs of legs and the hind two pairs. The chelicerae (mouthparts) are needle-like. In females the body behind the posterior limbs becomes much enlarged when eggs are being carried.

== Distribution ==
Members of this family have a widespread distribution and are found in most parts of the world.

== Ecology ==
The adult female mites are mostly parasitic on insects. Their host range includes many holometabolous insects such as honeybees, bark-boring beetles, moths and stored product pests. They parasitise various development stages of their host species but mostly it is the larvae which are attacked. They pierce the host with their chelicerae and suck out the haemolymph.

The female starts to breed after feeding on haemolymph. The eggs are retained inside the opisthosoma (body) behind the two rear pairs of legs, and this part of the body becomes grossly swollen while the larvae complete their development inside. The males emerge first and feed by puncturing their mother's opisthosoma. They copulate with the new-borne females when they emerge; this stimulates the females to crawl away and find new hosts to parasitise.

The genus Pyemotes includes species that attack bee and bark beetle larvae; some of them are venomous, paralysing the larvae being attacked with their saliva. One species Pyemotes tritici attacks the larvae of grain moths and stored grain pests and is known as the "straw itch mite" because when humans come into contact with it, it attempts to feed on their skin, injecting venomous saliva and causing an itchy red rash.

Some members of the family are not parasitic, with other feeding methods being herbivory and fungivory. Some species are the vectors of pathogenic fungi.
