= Pehr Kalm =

Swedish scientist and priest (1716-1779)

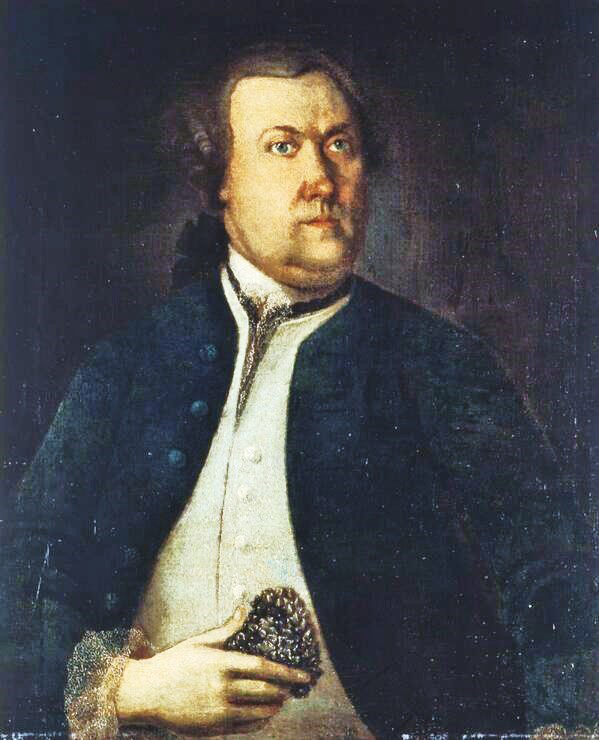
- A picture commonly believed to portray Kalm, although some modern-day historians have suggested it may be of Kalm's colleague Pehr Gadd. Painted by Johan Georg Geitel, 1764.
- Born: 6 March 1716; Ångermanland, Sweden
- Died: 16 November 1779 (aged 63); Åbo, Sweden
- Education: Royal Academy of Åbo, University of Uppsala
- Known for: Life cycle of the 17-year periodical cicada; Peter Kalm's Travels in North America: The English Version of 1770
- Scientific career
- Fields: Explorer, botanist, naturalist, agricultural economist.
- Institutions: Royal Academy of Åbo
- Academic advisors: Carl Linnaeus
- Notable students: Anders Chydenius
- Author abbrev. (botany): Kalm

Pehr Kalm (6 March 1716 – 16 November 1779), also known as Peter Kalm, was a Swedish-Finnish explorer, botanist, naturalist, and agricultural economist. He was one of the most important apostles of Carl Linnaeus.

In 1747, he was commissioned by the Royal Swedish Academy of Sciences to travel to the North American colonies in order to bring back seeds and plants that might be useful to agriculture. Among his many scientific accomplishments, Kalm can be credited with the first description of Niagara Falls written by a trained scientist. In addition, he published the first scientific paper on the North American 17-year periodical cicada, Magicicada septendecim.

Kalm wrote an account of his travels that was translated into numerous European languages; a 20th-century translation remains in print in English as Peter Kalm's Travels in North America: The English Version of 1770, translated by Swedish-American scholar Adolph B. Benson.

== Biography ==
Kalm was born to Gabriel Kalm and Katarina Ross in Ångermanland, Sweden, where his parents had taken refuge from Finland during the Great Northern War. His father was a Finnish clergyman and his mother was of Scottish ancestry. His father died six weeks after his birth. When the hostilities were over, his widowed mother returned with him to Närpes in Ostrobothnia, where Kalm's father had been a Lutheran minister.

Kalm studied at the Royal Academy of Åbo from 1735. In 1740, he entered the University of Uppsala, where he became one of the first students of the renowned naturalist Carl Linnaeus. In Uppsala, Kalm became the superintendent of an experimental plantation owned by his patron, Baron Sten Karl Bielke.

Kalm did field research in Sweden, Russia, and Ukraine from 1742 to 1746, when he was appointed docent of natural history and economics at the Royal Academy of Åbo. In 1747, the academy elevated him to professor of economics. That same year, he was also appointed by Linnaeus and the Royal Swedish Academy of Sciences (of which he had been a member since 1745) to travel to North America to find seeds and plants that might prove useful for agriculture or industry. In particular, they wanted him to bring back the red mulberry in the hope of starting a silk industry in Finland (which was then an integral part of Sweden).

On his journey from Sweden to Philadelphia, Pennsylvania, Kalm spent six months in England, where he met many of the important botanists of the day. Kalm arrived in Pennsylvania in 1748; there he was befriended by Benjamin Franklin and naturalist John Bartram. Kalm based his explorations at the Swedish-Finnish community of Raccoon, which is now Swedesboro, New Jersey in South Jersey. This town had been founded as part of the former Swedish colony of New Sweden. There, he also served as the substitute pastor of Trinity Church, the local Swedish Lutheran church. Kalm subsequently married Anna Margaretha Sjöman, the widow of Johan Sandin, the former pastor. He remained in Raccoon until 19 May 1749.

Kalm made trips as far west as Niagara Falls and as far north as Montreal and Quebec before returning to Finland in 1751. He took a post as professor at the Royal Academy of Åbo. In addition to teaching and directing students, he established botanical gardens in Åbo. He taught at the academy until his death in Åbo in 1779.

Anders Chydenius, another noted scientist, was a student of Pehr Kalm's.

== Legacy ==
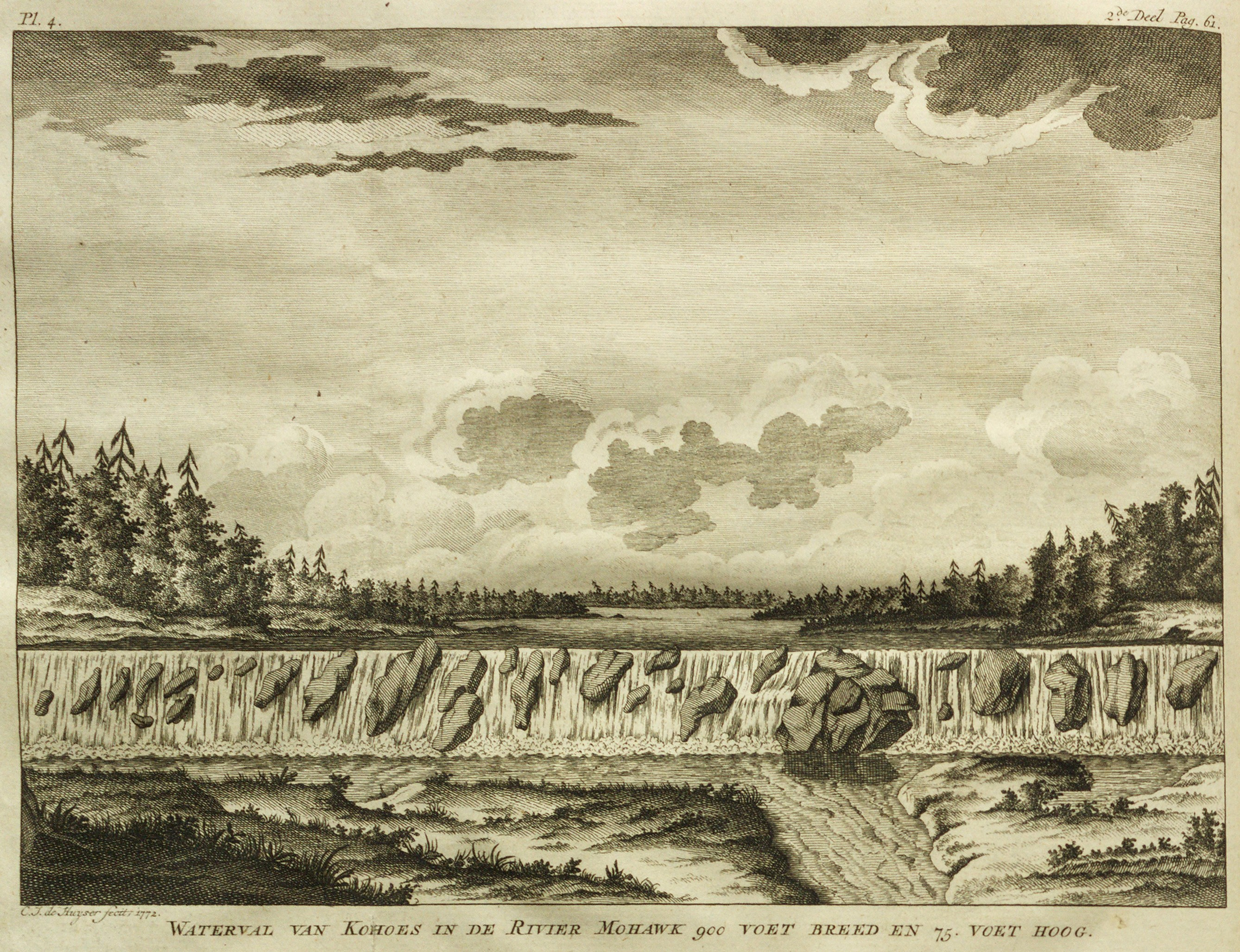
Illustration of Cohoes Falls, from the book En Resa til Norra America by Pehr Kalm

- Kalm's journal of his travels was published as En Resa til Norra America (Stockholm, 1753–1761). It was translated into German, Dutch, and French. Kalm described not only the flora and fauna of the New World, but also the lives of the Native Americans and the British and French colonists whom he met. A United States edition was later translated and edited by Swedish-American scholar and literary historian Adolph B. Benson (1881–1961). It was published as Peter Kalm's Travels in North America: The English Version of 1770 (Wilson-Erickson Inc., 1937). This version has become an important standard reference regarding life in colonial North America and has been in continuous print in several updated editions.
- Kalm's paper on the lifecycle of the North American 17-year periodical cicada, Magicicada septendecim, was the first published scientific description of the species and its recurrent appearances.
- In his Species Plantarum, Linnaeus cites Kalm for 90 species, 60 of them new, including the genus Kalmia, which Linnaeus named after Kalm. Kalmia latifolia (Mountain-laurel) is the state flower of Pennsylvania and Connecticut.
- The Mint of Finland issued a coin in Kalm's honor. He is regarded as one of the most notable Finnish explorers. In Finland he is also known as Pietari Kalm.
