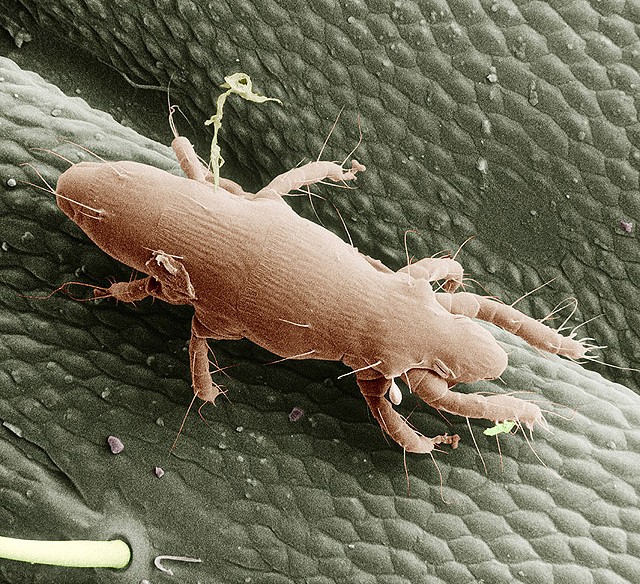

Scientific classification
- Kingdom: Animalia
- Phylum: Arthropoda
- Subphylum: Chelicerata
- Class: Arachnida
- Order: Trombidiformes
- Family: Pyemotidae
- Genus: Pyemotes
- Species: P. tritici

Binomial name
- Pyemotes tritici (LaGrèze-Fossat & Montagné, 1851)

Synonyms
- Acarus tritici LaGrèze-Fossat & Montagné, 1851

= Pyemotes tritici =

Species of mite

Pyemotes tritici is a species of mite known as the grain itch mite or straw itch mite. It is a cosmopolitan species that is found on straw, hay and stored grain. It is a parasite of small arthropods and is being investigated as a possible biological control of stored product pests. It is associated with dermatitis in humans, and it causes an itchy rash.

== Life cycle ==
Pyemotes tritici is ovoviviparous, this means that the embryos fully develop inside the female, emerging from the birth canal as adults. Males are born after a gestation period that is two days less than that of the females, the males help the females to emerge and copulation takes place as soon as the females are born. In fact any unmated female is unable to copulate later in life. Fewer than 10% of the offspring are male, although the proportion rises under conditions of gross overcrowding. On average, each female produces about 250 offspring, but after mating with about fifteen females, male fertility rates decline.

== Ecology ==
Pyemotes tritici is a parasite of arthropods. The females puncture the host with her stylet, injecting a toxic venom that paralyses the host, which eventually dies. The Angoumois grain moth (Sitotroga cerealella) is a pest of stored grain, laying its eggs on the seedheads in the field or on the grain in the silo. Until 1882, it was thought that Pyemotes tritici, which is sometimes found swarming over stored straw or hay, was feeding on the crop, however it turned out that the mites are carnivorous and are feeding on the larvae of the moth and other insect pests. When the mites come into contact with human skin, they attempt to feed there, causing an intense itchiness, often over the whole body surface. After about sixteen hours, blister-like vesicles erupt on the skin surface and other symptoms can include headache, joint pain, fever and nausea.

== Use in biological pest control ==
The mite is being investigated as a potential biological pest control agent for stored product pests; its high rate of population growth is likely to exceed that of its host arthropod, and it has been found possible to mass rear it in the laboratory.
