= Brood II =

Periodical cicada brood

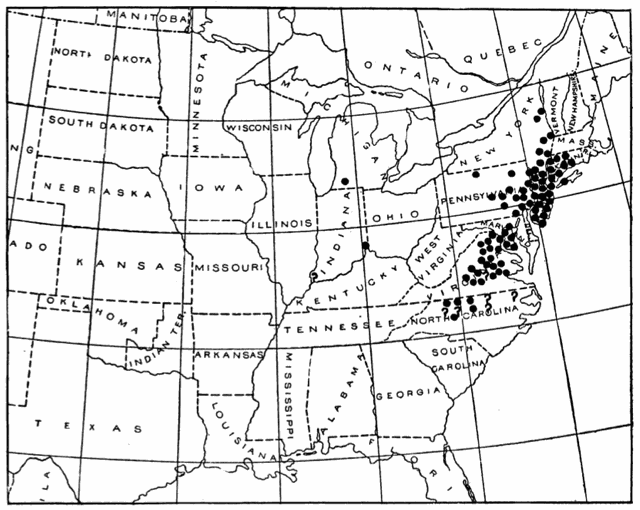
Geographic range of Brood II

Brood II is one of 15 separate broods of Magicicada (periodical cicadas) that appear regularly throughout the northeastern United States. Every 17 years, Brood II tunnels en masse to the surface of the ground, mates, lays eggs, and then dies off over the span of several weeks.

Although entomologist C. L. Marlatt published an account in 1907 in which he argued for the existence of 30 broods, over the years a number have been consolidated and only 15 are recognized today as being distinct. Brood II is among the 12 different broods with 17-year cycles.

== History ==
In 1775, Thomas Jefferson recorded in his "Garden Book" Brood II's 17-year periodicity, writing that an acquaintance remembered "great locust years" in 1724 and 1741, that he and others recalled another such year in 1758 and that the insects had again emerged from the ground at Monticello in 1775. He noted that the females lay their eggs in the small twigs of trees while above ground.

Brood II last appeared in the late spring and summer of 2013, and will emerge again in 2030 and 2047.

The four-centimeter-long (1.6 in) black insects do not sting or bite. Once they emerge, they spend their short, two-week adult lives climbing trees, shedding their crunchy skins and reproducing. They can number up to a million per hectare (2.5 acres).

== 2013 emergence ==
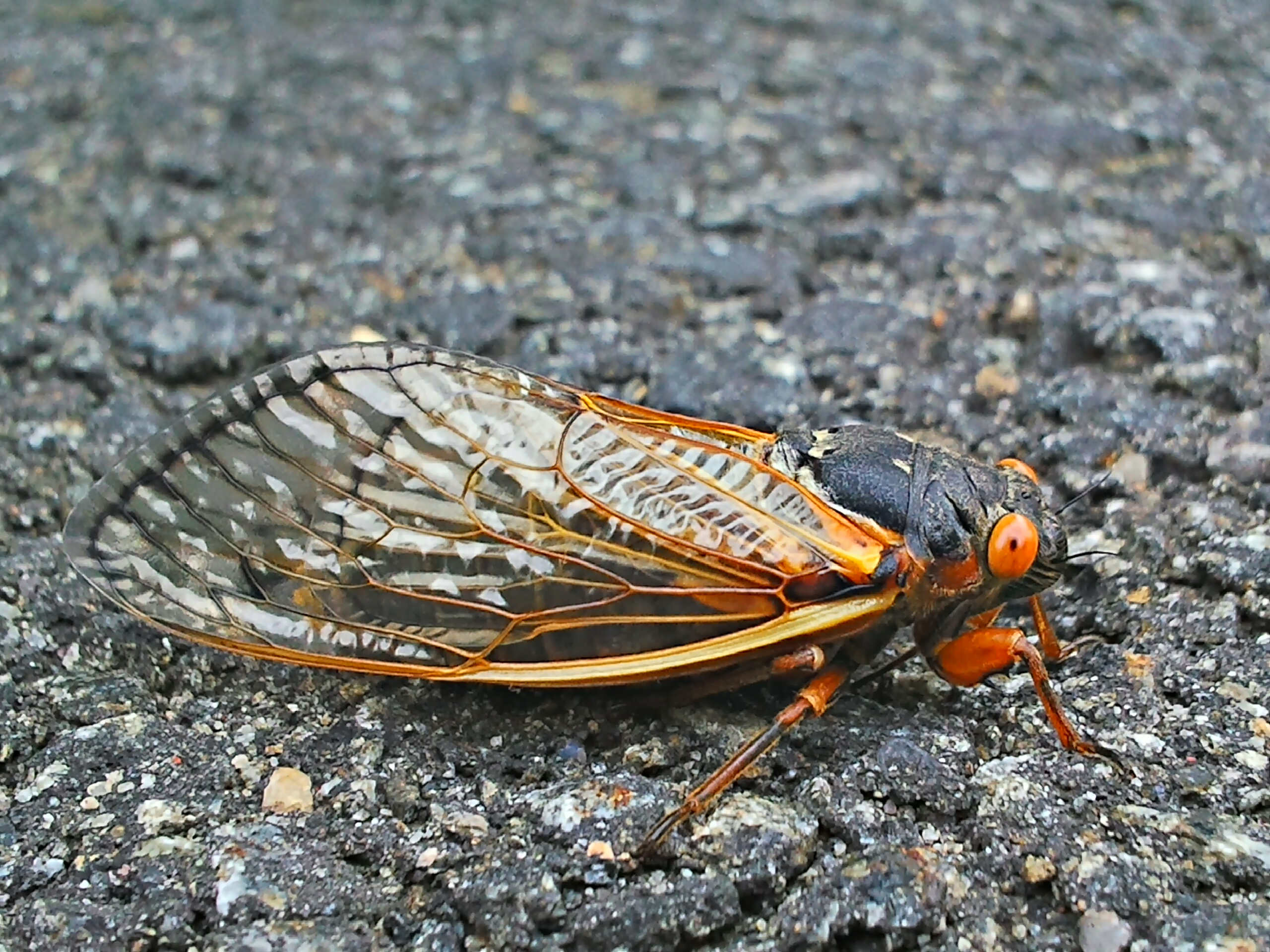
A cicada from the 2013 Brood II emergence rests on an elementary school parking lot.

In 2013, to aid in accurately mapping the geographic range of Brood II, National Public Radio's science show Radiolab created the Cicada Tracker project. It encouraged listeners to use a mix of Arduino-based tools to report the underground soil temperature so as to predict when the cicadas would appear. The National Geographic Society sponsored a citizen science project, the Magicicada Mapping Project, to track actual emergence. Clarinetist David Rothenberg performed with these cicadas, and has also performed with Brood XIX.
