= CBS Studio Building =

Office building in Manhattan, New York

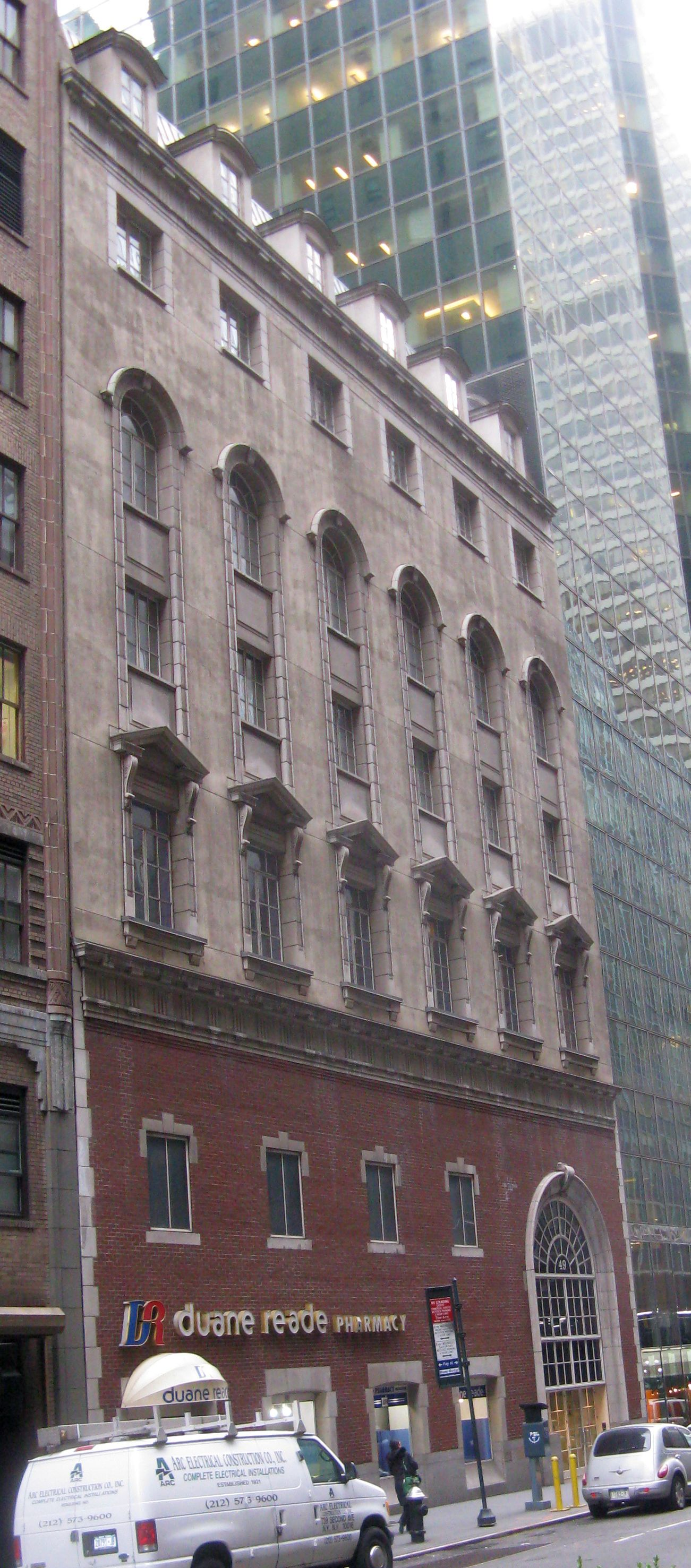
- Interactive map of the CBS Studio Building area

General information
- Type: Office
- Location: 49 East 52nd Street, Midtown Manhattan, New York, US
- Coordinates: 40.759164°N 73.974123°W
- Completed: 1908

Technical details
- Floor count: 7

Design and construction
- Architect: Warren & Wetmore

The CBS Studio Building is a seven-story office building at 49 East 52nd Street in Midtown Manhattan, New York City. It has had various uses at different times, including serving as a Vanderbilt family guest house, the first graduate school of the Juilliard School, CBS Radio studios, and Columbia Records studio.

It is currently owned by the Fisher Brothers, who converted it to an office building in conjunction with construction of the 45-story Park Avenue Plaza to its east.

== Vanderbilts ==
It was built in 1908 as a guest house for the Vanderbilts who had a home a block away at Fifth Avenue and 52nd. It was designed by Warren and Wetmore.

== Juilliard ==
In 1924 the Vanderbilts sold it to the Juilliard Musical Foundation where it became Juilliard's first graduate school.

== CBS Radio ==
In 1939, CBS, which had its corporate headquarters around the corner at 485 Madison Avenue, bought the building at 49 East 52nd Street to move its radio operations, except for the main network newsroom.

Architects Fellheimer & Wagner extensively renovated the building—including eliminating the earlier Vanderbilt ornate external features and eliminating windows for soundproofing—and carved up the building into seven studios, including one which could accommodate audiences of 300 as well as symphony orchestras that could broadcast. Arthur Godfrey broadcast from Studio 21 in the building and had his main office there.

== Columbia Records ==
With the advent of television, large radio studios that could accommodate audiences were no longer needed. Radio operations moved to the CBS Broadcast Center at 524 West 57th Street. By 1966 the facility had become recording studios for Columbia Records. Frank Sinatra, Barbra Streisand, Leonard Cohen, Laura Nyro, Bob Dylan (in spring 1970 for part of his New Morning album), Paul Simon, Asha Puthli with Ornette Coleman (Science Fiction), Miles Davis, Paul McCartney and Mahavishnu Orchestra (Birds of Fire) recorded music there.

The facility contained Columbia's "Studio B" on the second floor and "Studio E" on the sixth floor. From 1974 until 1982, CBS Radio Mystery Theatre was recorded in Studio 27, renamed Studio G in honor of Arthur Godfrey.

== Fisher Brothers ==
In 1979 the Fisher Brothers acquired the land under the building in conjunction with construction of the Park Avenue Plaza building to its east. However, CBS retained ownership of the building itself. In 1988 the building was leased to Sony, which had purchased CBS Records, and a Duane Reade store opened on the ground level and second floor. For several years CBS used studio space as offices. CBS eventually sold the building to Fisher Brothers in 1993, and in 1996 Fisher Brothers undid the 1930s Art Moderne style, replacing the windows and replicating the original Vanderbilt appearance.

== See also ==
- CBS 30th Street Studio
