= The Bootleg Series Vol. 18: Through the Open Window 1956–1963 =

Compilation album by Bob Dylan
- Released: October 31, 2025
- Recorded: c. 1956–October 26, 1963
- Genre: Folk
- Length: 154:08 (standard); 538:47 (deluxe)
- Labels: Columbia; Legacy
- Producers: Sean Wilentz; Steve Berkowitz

Bob Dylan chronology
The 1974 Live Recordings (2024)	The Bootleg Series Vol. 18: Through the Open Window 1956–1963 (2025)	The Rolling Thunder Revue: The 1976 Live Recordings (2026)

Bob Dylan Bootleg Series chronology
Vol. 17: Fragments – Time Out of Mind Sessions 1996–1997 (2023)	Vol. 18: Through the Open Window 1956-1963 (2025)

Singles from The Bootleg Series Vol. 18: Through the Open Window 1956–1963
- 1. "Rocks and Gravel (Solid Road)" Released: September 17, 2025

The Bootleg Series Vol. 18: Through the Open Window 1956–1963 is an archival compilation album by the American folk musician Bob Dylan, released on October 31, 2025. The Bootleg Series Vol. 18: Through the Open Window 1956–1963 includes the earliest recordings by Dylan, spanning from 1956 to 1963.

== Content ==
The Bootleg Series Vol. 18: Through the Open Window 1956–1963 consists of 165 tracks, spanning from a recording in the Terlinde Music Shop, St. Paul, Minnesota, on Christmas Eve 1956 (when Bob Zimmerman was 15 years old) to an October 26, 1963, Dylan performance at the Carnegie Hall. The album is produced by Steve Berkowitz and Sean Wilentz; Wilentz also wrote the liner notes for the box set booklet.

The single "Rocks and Gravel (Solid Road)" was originally recorded for The Freewheelin' Bob Dylan album, but did not make the final tracklist, for reasons unknown.

== Release and reception ==
=== Release ===
The Bootleg Series Vol. 18: Through the Open Window 1956–1963 was released on October 31, 2025, through Columbia Records and Legacy Recordings. It was issued as 8CD and 4LP sets, with a 2CD highlights compilation also released on the same day as the compilation. The first online single from the compilation was "Rocks and Gravel (Solid Road)", released on September 17, 2025.

=== Reception ===
Professional ratings
Aggregate scores
Source	Rating
Metacritic	96/100
Review scores
Source	Rating
AllMusic	4/5 stars
Classic Rock	5/5 stars
Exclaim!	9/10
Mojo	5/5 stars
Pitchfork	8.1/10
PopMatters	8/10
Record Collector	4/5 stars
Rolling Stone	4/5 stars
Uncut	5/5 stars

On Metacritic, which assigns a normalized scale from 0 to 100 based on reviews from critics, Through the Open Window has a rating of 96.

Paste magazine critic Matt Melis gave it a positive review, concluding that "In many ways, Through the Open Window serves as Dylan's own roaming, rambling account of how he quite literally made it to that historic venue after only a few short years on the folk scene." Writing for Ultimate Classic Rock, critic Michael Galluchi summarized it "tells the story of how Robert Zimmerman from Duluth, Minnesota, became Bob Dylan, the voice of a generation. It's told through home recordings, club performances, outtakes from his first three albums, radio appearances and the complete 1963 Carnegie Hall concert". Sean Hinman concluded in a review for the music website SuperDeluxeEdition that the compilation is an "essential set for diehard Dylan fans".

== Track listing ==
=== Standard edition ===
All tracks are written by Bob Dylan, except where noted.

Disc one
No.	Title	Writer(s)	Note	Length
1.	"Let the Good Times Roll"	Shirley Goodman; Leonard Lee	Terlinde Music Shop, St. Paul, MN, 1956	0:36
2.	"I Got a New Girl"		Informal Recording, Hibbing, MN, 1959	2:03
3.	"Jesus Christ"	Woody Guthrie	Informal Recording, Minneapolis, MN, 1960	2:21
4.	"K.C. Moan"	Traditional	Informal Recording, Madison, WI, 1960, with Danny Kalb	2:19
5.	"Remember Me"	Traditional	Informal Recording, East Orange, NJ, 1961	2:40
6.	"Railroading on the Great Divide"	Traditional	Gerde's Folk City, NYC, 1961, with Jim Kweskin	2:44
7.	"Man of Constant Sorrow"	Traditional	Bob Dylan Rehearsal, NYC, 1961	4:10
8.	"He Was a Friend of Mine"	Traditional	Bob Dylan Outtake, NYC, 1961 (Note: previously released on The Bootleg Series, Volumes. 1-3.)	4:05
9.	"Ramblin' Round"	Traditional	Bob Dylan Outtake, NYC, 1961	3:23
10.	"Story: East Orange, New Jersey"		Party, Minneapolis, MN, 1961	1:29
11.	"Po' Lazarus"	Traditional	Party, Minneapolis, MN, 1961	4:21
12.	"Dink's Song"	Traditional	Party, Minneapolis, MN, 1961	4:49
13.	"I Was Young When I Left Home"	Traditional	Party, Minneapolis, MN, 1961	5:42
14.	"Cocaine"	Traditional	Party, Minneapolis, MN, 1961	2:16
15.	"Talkin' New York"		Gerde's Folk City, NYC, 1962	4:16
16.	"Corrina, Corrina"	Traditional	Gerde's Folk City, NYC, 1962	3:50
17.	"(I Heard That) Lonesome Whistle"	Hank Williams; Willie Davis	The Freewheelin' Bob Dylan Outtake, NYC, 1962	2:05
18.	"Rocks and Gravel"		The Freewheelin' Bob Dylan Outtake, NYC, 1962	2:57
19.	"Let Me Die in My Footsteps"		The Finjan, Montreal, 1962	4:50
20.	"Tomorrow Is a Long Time"		Party, Minneapolis, MN, 1962	2:46
21.	"Don't Think Twice, It's All Right"		The Gaslight Cafe, NYC, 1962 (Note: previously released on Live at The Gaslight 1962.)	3:12
22.	"The Cuckoo"	Traditional	The Gaslight Cafe, NYC, 1962	2:19
23.	"The Ballad of the Gliding Swan"		BBC-TV, London, 1963	1:03
24.	"John Brown"		Broadside Ballads, NYC, 1963 (Note: previously released on Broadside Ballads, Vol. 1.)	4:24
25.	"Dusty Old Fairgrounds"		Town Hall, NYC, 1963	5:16
Total length:				79:56

Disc two
No.	Title	Writer(s)	Note	Length
1.	"The House of the Rising Sun"	Traditional	Informal Recording, NYC, 1963	3:17
2.	"Seven Curses"		The Times They Are A-Changin' Outtake, NYC, 1963	3:49
3.	"Masters of War"		The Freewheelin' Bob Dylan Alternate Take, NYC	4:23
4.	"Girl from the North Country"		The Freewheelin' Bob Dylan Alternate Take, NYC	3:43
5.	"Liverpool Gal"		Party, Minneapolis, MN, 1963	5:46
6.	"Boots of Spanish Leather"		The Times They Are A-Changin' Alternate Take, NYC, 1963	5:09
7.	"Moonshiner"	Traditional	The Times They Are A-Changin' Outtake, NYC, 1963	5:06
8.	"The Lonesome Death of Hattie Carroll"		Party, Los Angeles, 1963	4:31
9.	"The Times They Are a-Changin'"		Informal Recording, Los Angeles, 1963	2:40
10.	"Who Killed Davey Moore?"		Carnegie Hall, NYC, 1963	3:14
11.	"Lay Down Your Weary Tune"		Carnegie Hall, NYC, 1963 (Note: previously released on Live at Carnegie Hall 1963.)	4:52
12.	"Blowin' in the Wind"		Carnegie Hall, NYC, 1963	3:25
13.	"North Country Blues"		Carnegie Hall, NYC, 1963	4:08
14.	"A Hard Rain's a-Gonna Fall"		Carnegie Hall, NYC, 1963	8:03
15.	"Talkin' World War III Blues"		Carnegie Hall, NYC, 1963	4:58
16.	"Only a Pawn in Their Game"		Carnegie Hall, NYC, 1963	3:37
17.	"When the Ship Comes In"		Carnegie Hall, NYC, 1963	3:31
Total length:				74:12

=== Deluxe edition ===
Disc one
No.	Title	Writer(s)	Note	Length
1.	"Let the Good Times Roll"		Terlinde Music Shop, St. Paul, MN, 1956
2.	"I Got a New Girl"		Informal Recording, Hibbing, MN, 1959
3.	"San Francisco Bay Blues"		Informal Recording, Minneapolis, MN, 1960
4.	"Jesus Christ"	Woody Guthrie	Informal Recording, Minneapolis, MN, 1960
5.	"East Virginia Blues"		Informal Recording, Madison, WI, 1960
6.	"K.C. Moan"		Informal Recording, Madison, WI, 1960
7.	"Hard Travelin'"	Guthrie	Informal Recording, Madison, WI, 1960
8.	"Pastures of Plenty"		Informal Recording, East Orange, NJ, 1961
9.	"Remember Me"		Informal Recording, East Orange, NJ, 1961
10.	"Song to Woody" (live)	Bob Dylan	The Gaslight Cafe, NYC, 1961
11.	"Talkin' Bear Mountain Picnic Massacre Blues" (live)	Dylan	The Gaslight Cafe, NYC, 1961
12.	"Ain't No Grave"		Informal Recording, NYC, 1961
13.	"I Ain't Got No Home"	Guthrie	University of Minnesota, Minneapolis, MN, 1961
14.	"Death Don't Have No Mercy"		Party, Minneapolis, MN, 1961
15.	"Devilish Mary"		Party, Minneapolis, MN, 1961
16.	"Introduction: Riverside Church"		Riverside Church, NYC, 1961
17.	"Handsome Molly"		Riverside Church, NYC, 1961
18.	"Introduction: See That My Grave Is Kept Clean" (live)		Gerdes Folk City, NYC, 1961
19.	"See That My Grave Is Kept Clean" (live)		Gerdes Folk City, NYC, 1961
20.	"The Girl I Left Behind" (live)		Gerdes Folk City, NYC, 1961
21.	"Introduction: Pretty Boy Floyd" (live)		Gerdes Folk City, NYC, 1961
22.	"Pretty Boy Floyd" (live)		Gerdes Folk City, NYC, 1961
23.	"Railroading on the Great Divide" (live)		Gerdes Folk City, NYC, 1961
24.	"Introduction: Fixin' to Die" (live)		Folklore Center, NYC, 1961
25.	"Fixin' to Die" (live)		Folklore Center, NYC, 1961
26.	"I'll Fly Away" (Carolyn Hester)		Alternate Take, NYC, 1961

Disc two
No.	Title	Note	Length
1.	"Introduction: In the Pines" (live)	Carnegie Chapter Hall, NYC, 1961
2.	"In the Pines" (live)	Carnegie Chapter Hall, NYC, 1961
3.	"Gospel Plow" (live)	Carnegie Chapter Hall, NYC, 1961
4.	"Introduction: Young But Daily Growing" (live)	Carnegie Chapter Hall, NYC, 1961
5.	"Young But Daily Growing" (live)	Carnegie Chapter Hall, NYC, 1961
6.	"Man on the Street" (live)	Carnegie Chapter Hall, NYC, 1961
7.	"This Land Is Your Land (Note: previously released on The Bootleg Series Vol. 7: No Direction Home: The Soundtrack.)" (live)	Carnegie Chapter Hall, NYC, 1961
8.	"Pretty Polly" (live)	Carnegie Chapter Hall, NYC, 1961
9.	"Man of Constant Sorrow"	Bob Dylan Rehearsal, NYC, 1961
10.	"House Carpenter"	Bob Dylan Outtake, NYC, 1961
11.	"You're No Good"	Bob Dylan Alternate Take, NYC, 1961
12.	"He Was a Friend of Mine"	Bob Dylan Outtake, NYC, 1961
13.	"Ramblin' Round"	Bob Dylan Outtake, NYC, 1961
14.	"Story: East Orange, New Jersey"	Party, Minneapolis, MN, 1961
15.	"Stealin'"	Party, Minneapolis, MN, 1961
16.	"Po' Lazarus"	Party, Minneapolis, MN, 1961
17.	"Dink's Song"	Party, Minneapolis, MN, 1961
18.	"I Was Young When I Left Home"	Party, Minneapolis, MN, 1961
19.	"In the Evening"	Party, Minneapolis, MN, 1961
20.	"Baby, Let Me Follow You Down"	Party, Minneapolis, MN, 1961
21.	"Cocaine"	Party, Minneapolis, MN, 1961

Disc three
No.	Title	Writer(s)	Note	Length
1.	"The Death of Emmett Till"	Dylan	WBAI-FM, NYC, 1962
2.	"Conversation: Folksinger's Choice, 1"		WBAI-FM, NYC, 1962
3.	"Roll On, John"		WBAI-FM, NYC, 1962
4.	"Conversation: Folksinger's Choice, 2"		WBAI-FM, NYC, 1962
5.	"Hard Times in New York Town"	Dylan	WBAI-FM, NYC, 1962
6.	"Talkin' John Birch Paranoid Blues"	Dylan	Informal Recording, NYC, 1962
7.	"Ballad of Donald White"	Dylan	Informal Recording, NYC, 1962
8.	"Midnight Special" (Harry Belafonte with Bob Dylan)		The Midnight Special Rehearsals, NYC, 1962
9.	"Midnight Special" (Harry Belafonte with Bob Dylan)		The Midnight Special Alternate Take, NYC, 1962
10.	"Wichita" (Big Joe Williams with Bob Dylan)		Three Kings and the Queen Album Version, NYC, 1962
11.	"It's Dangerous" (Victoria Spivey with Bob Dylan and Big Joe Williams)		Three Kings and the Queen, Volume Two Album Version, NYC, 1962
12.	"Honey, Just Allow Me One More Chance (Note: previously released on The 50th Anniversary Collection.)" (live)		Gerdes Folk City, NYC, 1962
13.	"Talkin' New York" (live)	Dylan	Gerdes Folk City, NYC, 1962
14.	"Corrina, Corrina" (live)		Gerdes Folk City, NYC, 1962
15.	"Deep Ellum Blues" (live)		Gerdes Folk City, NYC, 1962
16.	"Introduction: Blowin' in the Wind" (live)		Gerdes Folk City, NYC, 1962
17.	"Blowin' in the Wind" (live)	Dylan	Gerdes Folk City, NYC, 1962
18.	"Rambling, Gambling Willie"	Dylan	The Freewheelin' Bob Dylan Outtake, NYC, 1962
19.	"(I Heard That) Lonesome Whistle"		The Freewheelin' Bob Dylan Outtake, NYC, 1962
20.	"Rocks and Gravel (Solid Road)"	Dylan	The Freewheelin' Bob Dylan Outtake, NYC, 1962
21.	"Paths of Victory"		Broadside Office, NYC, 1962
22.	"Train A-Travelin'"		Broadside Reunion Album Version, NYC, 1962
23.	"Hiram Hubbard" (live)		The Finjan, Montreal, 1962
24.	"Quit Your Low Down Ways" (live)	Dylan	The Finjan, Montreal, 1962
25.	"Let Me Die in My Footsteps" (live)	Dylan	The Finjan, Montreal, 1962
26.	"Ramblin' on My Mind" (live)		The Finjan, Montreal, 1962
27.	"Blue Yodel No. 8 (Mule Skinner Blues)" (live)		The Finjan, Montreal, 1962

Disc four
No.	Title	Writer(s)	Note	Length
1.	"Baby, Please Don't Go"		The Freewheelin' Bob Dylan Outtake, NYC, 1962
2.	"Worried Blues"		The Freewheelin' Bob Dylan Outtake, NYC, 1962
3.	"Baby, I'm in the Mood for You"		The Freewheelin' Bob Dylan Outtake, NYC, 1962
4.	"Bob Dylan's Blues"	Dylan	The Freewheelin' Bob Dylan Alternate Take, NYC, 1962
5.	"Introduction: Tomorrow Is a Long Time"		Party, Minneapolis, MN, 1962
6.	"Tomorrow Is a Long Time"	Dylan	Party, Minneapolis, MN, 1962
7.	"This Land Is Your Land"		Party, Minneapolis, MN, 1962
8.	"Long Time Gone"	Dylan	Party, Minneapolis, MN, 1962
9.	"A Hard Rain's A-Gonna Fall" (live)	Dylan	The Gaslight Cafe, NYC (October 15, 1962)
10.	"Don't Think Twice, It's All Right" (live)	Dylan	The Gaslight Cafe, NYC (October 15, 1962)
11.	"Barbara Allen" (live)		The Gaslight Cafe, NYC (October 15, 1962)
12.	"The Cuckoo" (live)		The Gaslight Cafe, NYC (October 15, 1962)
13.	"That's All Right"		The Freewheelin' Bob Dylan Outtake, NYC, 1962
14.	"Mixed-Up Confusion"	Dylan	Single Alternate Take, NYC, 1962
15.	"Ballad of Hollis Brown"	Dylan	The Freewheelin' Bob Dylan Outtake, NYC, 1962
16.	"Kingsport Town"		The Freewheelin' Bob Dylan Outtake, NYC, 1962
17.	"Whatcha Gonna Do?"		The Freewheelin' Bob Dylan Outtake, NYC, 1962
18.	"Hero Blues"	Dylan	The Freewheelin' Bob Dylan Outtake, NYC, 1962
19.	"I Shall Be Free"	Dylan	The Freewheelin' Bob Dylan Alternate Take, NYC, 1962

Disc five
No.	Title	Writer(s)	Note	Length
1.	"The Ballad of the Gliding Swan"		BBC-TV, London, 1963
2.	"Only a Hobo" (Bob Dylan with Happy Traum and Gil Turner)	Dylan	Broadside Ballads Album Version, NYC, 1963
3.	"John Brown"	Dylan	Broadside Ballads Album Version, NYC, 1963
4.	"All Over You"		Informal Recording, NYC, 1963
5.	"Oxford Town (Note: previously released on The Bootleg Series Vol. 9: The Witmark Demos: 1962–1964.)"	Dylan	Witmark Demo, NYC, 1963
6.	"Bob Dylan's Dream" (live)	Dylan	Town Hall, NYC (April 12, 1963)
7.	"Introduction: Walls of Red Wing" (live)		Town Hall, NYC (April 12, 1963)
8.	"Walls of Red Wing" (live)	Dylan	Town Hall, NYC (April 12, 1963)
9.	"Introduction: Tomorrow Is a Long Time" (live)		Town Hall, NYC (April 12, 1963)
10.	"Tomorrow Is a Long Time (Note: previously released on Bob Dylan's Greatest Hits Vol. II.)" (live)	Dylan	Town Hall, NYC (April 12, 1963)
11.	"Dusty Old Fairgrounds" (live)	Dylan	Town Hall, NYC (April 12, 1963)
12.	"Introduction: Pretty Peggy-O" (live)		Town Hall, NYC (April 12, 1963)
13.	"Pretty Peggy-O" (live)		Town Hall, NYC (April 12, 1963)
14.	"Who Killed Davey Moore?" (live)	Dylan	Town Hall, NYC (April 12, 1963)
15.	"Last Thoughts on Woody Guthrie" (live)	Dylan	Town Hall, NYC, 1963
16.	"James Alley Blues"		Informal Recording, NYC, 1963
17.	"I Rode Out One Morning"		Informal Recording, NYC, 1963
18.	"House of the Rising Sun"		Informal Recording, NYC, 1963
19.	"Talkin' World War III Blues" (live)	Dylan	Club 47, Cambridge, MA, 1963
20.	"Masters of War"	Dylan	The Freewheelin' Bob Dylan Alternate Take, NYC, 1963
21.	"Girl from the North Country"	Dylan	The Freewheelin' Bob Dylan Alternate Take, NYC, 1963

Disc six
No.	Title	Writer(s)	Note	Length
1.	"Introduction by Cordell Reagon"		SNCC Rally, Greenwood, MS, 1963
2.	"Only a Pawn in Their Game" (live)	Dylan	SNCC Rally, Greenwood, MS, 1963
3.	"Blowin' in the Wind" (live)	Dylan	SNCC Rally, Greenwood, MS, 1963
4.	"Eternal Circle"	Dylan	Party, Minneapolis, MN, 1963
5.	"Liverpool Gal"	Dylan	Party, Minneapolis, MN, 1963
6.	"West Memphis" (Bob Dylan with Tony Glover)		Party, Minneapolis, MN, 1963
7.	"North Country Blues" (live)	Dylan	Newport Folk Festival, RI, 1963
8.	"With God on Our Side" (Bob Dylan with Joan Baez, live)	Dylan	Newport Folk Festival, RI, 1963
9.	"Playboys and Playgirls" (live)		Newport Folk Festival, RI, 1963
10.	"Blowin' in the Wind" (Bob Dylan with Joan Baez, Peter, Paul and Mary, The Freedom Singers & Pete Seeger, live)	Dylan	Newport Folk Festival, RI, 1963
11.	"Slate: Boots of Spanish Leather"	Dylan	The Times They Are A-Changin' Sessions, NYC, 1963
12.	"Boots of Spanish Leather"	Dylan	The Times They Are A-Changin' Alternate Take, NYC, 1963
13.	"Seven Curses"	Dylan	The Times They Are A-Changin' Outtake, NYC, 1963
14.	"Farewell"	Dylan	The Times They Are A-Changin' Outtake, NYC, 1963
15.	"Bob Dylan's New Orleans Rag"	Dylan	The Times They Are A-Changin' Outtake, NYC, 1963
16.	"Moonshiner"	Dylan	The Times They Are A-Changin' Outtake, NYC, 1963
17.	"Introduction by Joan Baez" (live)		Forest Hills Tennis Stadium, NYC, 1963
18.	"Troubled and I Don't Know Why" (Bob Dylan with Joan Baez, live)		Forest Hills Tennis Stadium, NYC, 1963
19.	"Introduction by Ossie Davis"		March on Washington, Washington, D.C., 1963
20.	"When the Ship Comes In" (Bob Dylan with Joan Baez, live)	Dylan	March on Washington, Washington, D.C., 1963
21.	"The Lonesome Death of Hattie Carroll"	Dylan	Party, Los Angeles, 1963
22.	"The Times They Are A-Changin'"	Dylan	Informal Recording, Los Angeles, 1963
23.	"One Too Many Mornings"	Dylan	The Times They Are A-Changin' Alternate Take, NYC, 1963
24.	"Key to the Highway"	Dylan	The Times They Are A-Changin' Outtake, NYC, 1963

Disc seven
No.	Title	Writer(s)	Note	Length
1.	"The Times They Are A-Changin'"	Dylan	Carnegie Hall, NYC (October 26, 1963)
2.	"Ballad of Hollis Brown"	Dylan	Carnegie Hall, NYC (October 26, 1963)
3.	"Introduction: Who Killed Davey Moore?"	Dylan	Carnegie Hall, NYC (October 26, 1963)
4.	"Who Killed Davey Moore?"	Dylan	Carnegie Hall, NYC (October 26, 1963)
5.	"Boots of Spanish Leather"	Dylan	Carnegie Hall, NYC (October 26, 1963)
6.	"Talkin' John Birch Paranoid Blues"	Dylan	Carnegie Hall, NYC (October 26, 1963)
7.	"Lay Down Your Weary Tune"	Dylan	Carnegie Hall, NYC (October 26, 1963)
8.	"Introduction: Blowin' in the Wind"		Carnegie Hall, NYC (October 26, 1963)
9.	"Blowin' in the Wind"	Dylan	Carnegie Hall, NYC (October 26, 1963)
10.	"Introduction: Percy's Song"		Carnegie Hall, NYC (October 26, 1963)
11.	"Percy's Song"	Dylan	Carnegie Hall, NYC (October 26, 1963)
12.	"Seven Curses"	Dylan	Carnegie Hall, NYC (October 26, 1963)
13.	"Walls of Red Wing"	Dylan	Carnegie Hall, NYC (October 26, 1963)
14.	"Introduction: North Country Blues"		Carnegie Hall, NYC (October 26, 1963)
15.	"North Country Blues"	Dylan	Carnegie Hall, NYC (October 26, 1963)
16.	"A Hard Rain's A-Gonna Fall"	Dylan	Carnegie Hall, NYC (October 26, 1963)

Disc eight
No.	Title	Writer(s)	Note	Length
1.	"Talkin' World War III Blues"	Dylan	Carnegie Hall, NYC (October 26, 1963)
2.	"Don't Think Twice, It's All Right"	Dylan	Carnegie Hall, NYC (October 26, 1963)
3.	"Story: Hootenanny Hoot"		Carnegie Hall, NYC (October 26, 1963)
4.	"With God on Our Side"	Dylan	Carnegie Hall, NYC (October 26, 1963)
5.	"Only a Pawn in Their Game"	Dylan	Carnegie Hall, NYC (October 26, 1963)
6.	"Introduction: Masters of War"		Carnegie Hall, NYC (October 26, 1963)
7.	"Masters of War"	Dylan	Carnegie Hall, NYC (October 26, 1963)
8.	"Introduction: The Lonesome Death of Hattie Carroll"		Carnegie Hall, NYC (October 26, 1963)
9.	"The Lonesome Death of Hattie Carroll"	Dylan	Carnegie Hall, NYC (October 26, 1963)
10.	"Introduction: When the Ship Comes In"		Carnegie Hall, NYC (October 26, 1963)
11.	"When the Ship Comes In"	Dylan	Carnegie Hall, NYC (October 26, 1963)

== Charts ==
Chart performance for The Bootleg Series Vol. 18: Through the Open Window 1956–1963
Chart (2025)	Peak position
Australian Albums (ARIA)	32
Austrian Albums (Ö3 Austria)	8
Belgian Albums (Ultratop Flanders)	11
Belgian Albums (Ultratop Wallonia)	53
Dutch Albums (Album Top 100)	28
French Albums (SNEP)	104
German Albums (Offizielle Top 100)	9
German Rock & Metal Albums (Offizielle Top 100)	3
Irish Albums (IRMA)	79
Japanese Rock Albums (Oricon)	12
Japanese Western Albums (Oricon)	17
Japanese Top Albums Sales (Billboard Japan)	45
Norwegian Albums (IFPI Norge)	66
Scottish Albums (Official Charts)	10
Swedish Albums (Sverigetopplistan)	21
Swiss Albums (Schweizer Hitparade)	10
UK Albums (Official Charts)	28
UK Americana Albums (Official Charts)	1
US Billboard 200	163
US Americana/Folk Albums (Billboard)	10
US Top Rock & Alternative Albums (Billboard)	38
