= Talkin' John Birch Paranoid Blues =

Bob Dylan song

Song by Bob Dylan

from the album The Bootleg Series Volumes 1–3 (Rare & Unreleased) 1961–1991
- Released: March 26, 1991
- Recorded: April 24, 1962
- Genre: Protest song; talking blues
- Length: 4:25
- Label: Columbia
- Songwriter: Bob Dylan
- Producer: John H. Hammond

"Talkin' John Birch Paranoid Blues", also known as "Talkin' John Birch Society Blues" and "Talkin' John Birch Blues", is a protest song and talking blues song written by singer-songwriter Bob Dylan in 1962. It is a satirical song, in which a paranoid narrator is convinced that communists, or "Reds" as he calls them, are infiltrating the country. He joins the John Birch Society, an anti-communist group, and begins searching for Reds everywhere. The narrator decries Betsy Ross as a communist and four U.S. Presidents as Russian spies, while lauding Adolf Hitler and George Lincoln Rockwell. After exhausting the possibilities of new places to find communists, he begins to investigate himself.

Dylan was given the opportunity to perform on The Ed Sullivan Show and wanted to sing "Talkin' John Birch Paranoid Blues" on the program. CBS worried that including the song on the show could result in a defamation suit from members of the John Birch Society, though Ed Sullivan was supportive of the song. Dylan refused to perform a different song on the show, and he walked off its set; the incident garnered publicity. The controversy surrounding the song caused Columbia Records to remove "Talkin' John Birch Paranoid Blues" from subsequent copies of The Freewheelin' Bob Dylan (1963), though it was released on later Dylan albums. The song has been praised for its humor and deemed politically relevant decades after its release by both progressive and conservative publications.

== Composition and analysis ==
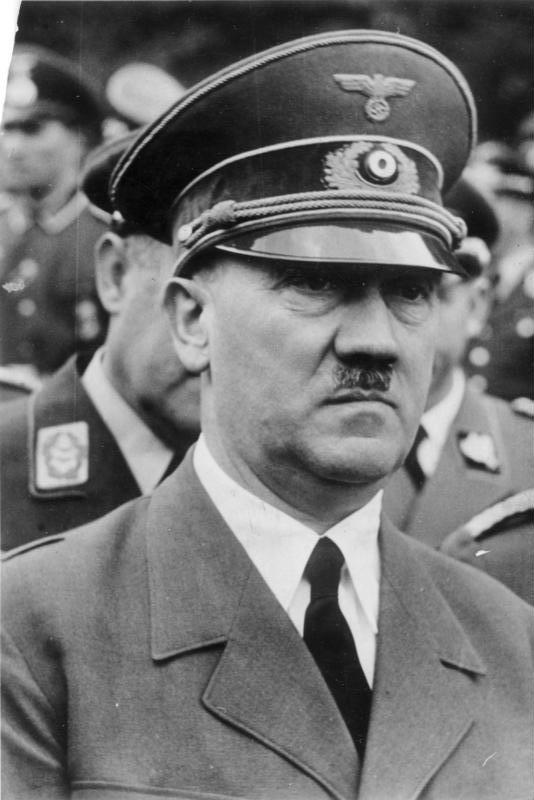
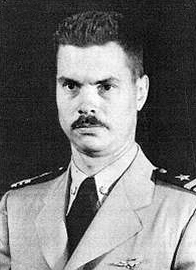
The song's narrator lauds Adolf Hitler (left) and George Lincoln Rockwell (right).

Bob Dylan wrote "Talkin' John Birch Paranoid Blues", a protest song and talking blues song, in 1962. The song was inspired by an incident where George Lincoln Rockwell, the founder of the American Nazi Party and an anti-communist, arrived in a Nazi uniform outside a theater showing Exodus (1960), a film about the founding of Israel. It is a satirical song, in which a paranoid narrator is convinced that communists, or "Reds" as he calls them, are infiltrating the country. He joins the John Birch Society, an anti-communist group which asserted that President Dwight D. Eisenhower was a "dedicated, conscious agent of the communist conspiracy."

The song's protagonist begins searching for Reds everywhere: under his bed, up his chimney, down his toilet and in his glove compartment. The narrator says he and other members of the Society agree with Adolf Hitler's views despite the fact that he was responsible for the deaths of six million Jews, concluding that Hitler's fascism was irrelevant since at least he was not a communist. The narrator believes Betsy Ross was a communist because she designed the American flag with red stripes and accuses U.S. Presidents Dwight D. Eisenhower, Abraham Lincoln, Thomas Jefferson and "that Roosevelt guy" of being Russian spies. He also says that "To my knowledge there's just one man/ That's really a true American: George Lincoln Rockwell/ I know that he hates Commies cus [sic] he picketed the movie Exodus". After exhausting the possibilities of new places to find communists, the narrator begins to investigate himself.

In Bob Dylan: Prophet, Mystic, Poet, Seth Rogovoy wonders why "picketing Exodus would indicate anti-Communist tendencies". Rogovoy theorizes that Dylan could be referencing the alleged association between Jews and communism or the fact that Exodus was scripted by Dalton Trumbo, one of the Hollywood Ten who were blacklisted for being communists. Rogovoy also notes that the song's reference to Exodus illustrates Dylan's love of that film; the singer would later introduce performances of "All Along the Watchtower" with a snippet of the "Theme from Exodus" by Ernest Gold. A writer for PBS interpreted the song as being about the importance of freedom of speech. David E. Kaufman says in Jewhooing the Sixties: American Celebrity and Jewish Identity that "Talkin' John Birch Society Blues" includes some of Dylan's few explicit references to his own Jewishness, though none of its lines are "exactly a ringing endorsement of his identity as a Jew."

== Critical reception ==
Joe Lynch of Billboard said that while Dylan is "not exactly "Weird Al" Yankovic or Tom Lehrer, [he] has given us many wry, witty and hilariously outlandish lyrics over the years" and listed the song's line about Betsy Ross as one of the funniest in Dylan's discography. Amanda Petrusich of Pitchfork wrote that the "infamous" song exemplified that "Dylan's comedic timing was at its apex in '64, growling perfect punchlines ('I heard some footsteps by the front porch door/ So I grabbed my shotgun from the floor/ I snuck around the house with a huff and a hiss, saying hands up, you communist!/ It was the mailman/ He punched me out') every single time." PBS called the song a "prime example" of how "Dylan's early '60s songs often have a whimsical touch—a sort of audio camouflage for the radical content of the lyrics." The Houston Chronicle's Chris Gray felt that "Talkin' John Birch Society Blues" prefigures later satirical songs like Green Day's "Holiday," St. Vincent's "Los Ageless" and Kendrick Lamar's "Humble".

Tim Murphy of the progressive publication Mother Jones wrote in 2010 that "Talkin' John Birch Paranoid Blues" seemed especially relevant as the John Birch Society was allowed to participate in that year's Conservative Political Action Conference and had been embraced by Ron Paul. Murphy said that, given the Society's newfound relevance, perhaps Dylan should have played the song when he performed at the White House earlier that year. In a 2017 article for The American Conservative, Scott Beauchamp writes that the track is a "great example" of Dylan "skewering the diffuse paranoia of the time by lending articulation to the logic of a situation." Beauchamp also opined that "Half a century later, the humor of this muddy, paranoid thinking persists, albeit in reverse political polarity," wherein people will use the term "fascist" to refer to conservatives, President Donald Trump, or anything they dislike; he added that "the definition [of 'fascism'] should be deeply grounded in historical and political specificity, lest we come to believe that what made the Nazis fascist was their rude demeanor or failure to vote for Hillary Clinton."

== The Ed Sullivan Show controversy ==
"Talkin' John Birch Paranoid Blues" was at the center of a controversy that brought national attention to Dylan and played a significant part in shaping his second album, The Freewheelin' Bob Dylan. On May 12, 1963, with the album about to be released, Dylan was scheduled to appear on The Ed Sullivan Show on CBS. The Sunday evening variety show, among the most popular shows on American television, had earlier introduced Elvis Presley to national audiences and in 1964 would do the same for The Beatles.

Dylan had auditioned for the show in early 1962, before the release of his first album. He played a few songs from the recording, but the network executives who sat in on the set were not exactly sure what to make of him. Unhappy with the experience, Dylan thought he would not hear from the network again. More than a year passed when the call came inviting him to make a guest appearance on the show.

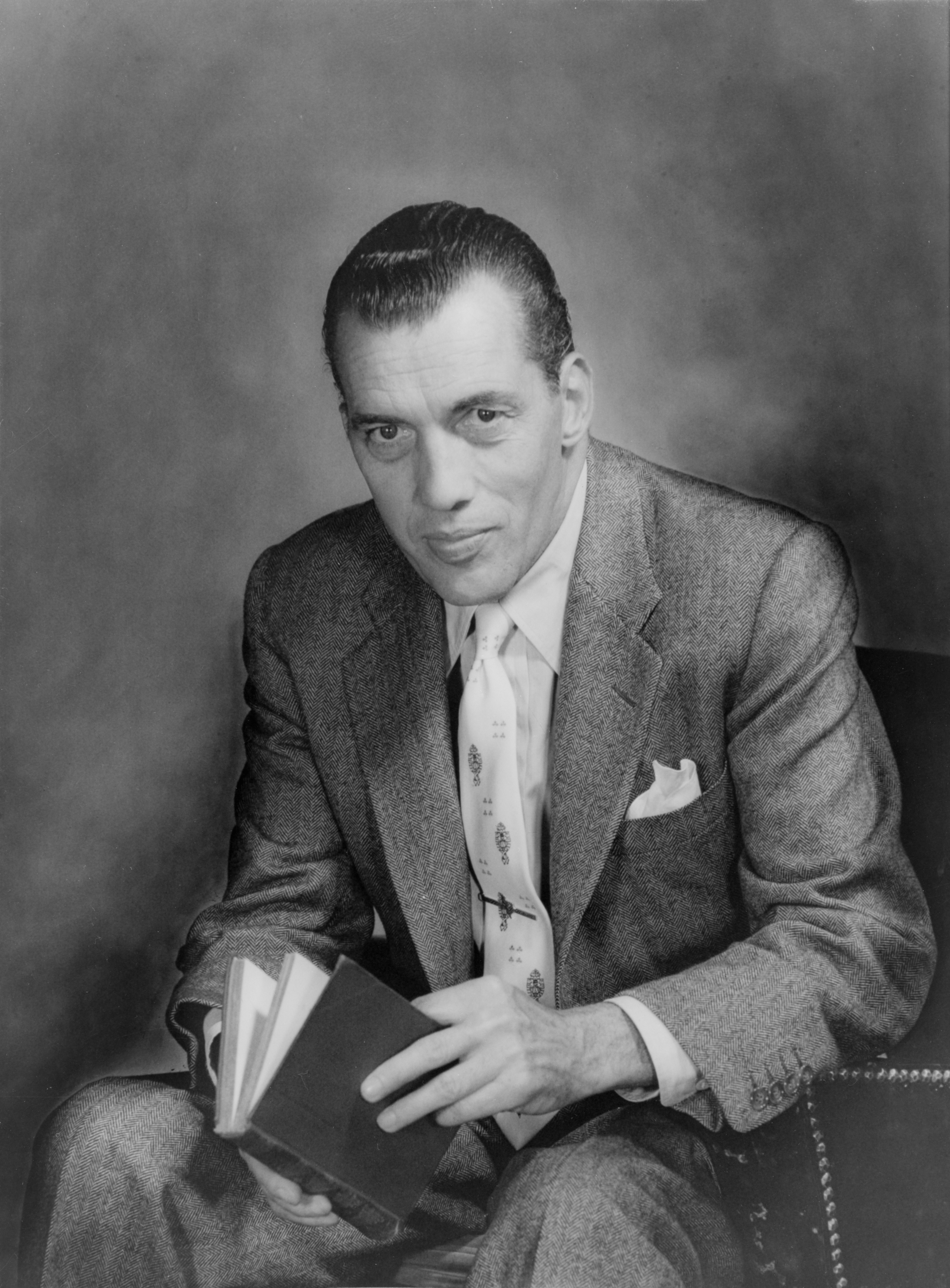
Ed Sullivan felt Dylan should be allowed to perform the song on his show.

For his one selection, Dylan chose "Talkin' John Birch Society Blues" (as it was then titled). Ed Sullivan and his producer heard him play it at the Saturday rehearsal on May 11 and were delighted with the song. However, when Dylan showed up for the dress rehearsal the next afternoon, the day of the show, a CBS program practices executive told him the song would have to be replaced because of possible defamation against John Birch Society members. Refusing to do a different song, Dylan walked off the set. The incident drew national attention with reports running in The New York Times, Billboard and The Village Voice. Sullivan, meanwhile, backed Dylan, arguing that if network programs could poke fun at President John F. Kennedy, the John Birch Society should not be immune from similar treatment. Concerned about possible reprisals from the John Birch group, the network held to its decision. Then the controversy spilled over into Columbia, CBS's records division. When the company's lawyers learned that "Talkin' John Birch" was slated for the album, they ordered the song removed.

Dylan was in a delicate situation. His first album had sold poorly, and he did not have the power at this point to fight his record company. Though upset by the order, he relented. The initial shipments of Freewheelin, which had already been sent out, were recalled, and the album was re-issued without "Talkin' John Birch Society Blues". Per a 2012 report, early copies of the record that feature "Talkin' John Birch Paranoid Blues" are worth as much as $20,000. Dylan ultimately profited from the affair. Besides the favorable publicity from The Ed Sullivan Show walk-out, it gave him a chance to re-consider his selections for Freewheelin, which he felt had too many "old fashioned" selections, songs closer in style to his earlier material. In addition to "Talkin' John Birch Society", he dropped three of his other older songs, including "Let Me Die In My Footsteps", "Ramblin' Gamblin' Willie" and "Rocks and Gravel". In their place, he substituted four tunes recorded during the last of the Freewheelin' sessions: "Masters of War", "Girl from the North Country", "Bob Dylan's Dream" and "Talkin' World War III Blues".

== Recordings and performance ==
Dylan recorded "Talkin' John Birch Society Blues" during the first Freewheelin' Bob Dylan session at Columbia's Studio A on April 24, 1962. He wrote the song in February 1962, and its lyrics and music appeared in the premiere issue of Broadside later that month, becoming the first of Dylan's songs to be published. In March 1963, nearly a year after recording the album version, he taped a demo for his music publisher, M. Witmark & Sons. This recording was released on The Bootleg Series Vol. 9: The Witmark Demos: 1962–1964 in October 2010.

Dylan's first concert performance of the song was on September 22, 1962 at folk musician Pete Seeger's annual hootenanny at Carnegie Hall in New York. After The Ed Sullivan Show incident, he played the song at his solo appearances through the end of 1964, often making fun of CBS's decision in the introduction. A performance from his Carnegie Hall concert on October 26, 1963 was included on The Bootleg Series Volumes 1–3 (Rare & Unreleased) 1961–1991. The last of Dylan's live recordings of the song was during his 1964 Halloween concert at New York's Philharmonic Hall, which appeared on The Bootleg Series Vol. 6: Bob Dylan Live 1964, Concert at Philharmonic Hall in March 2004.

== Covers ==
Steve Buscemi covered "Talkin' John Birch Paranoid Blues" at a Dylan tribute concert in honor of the singer's 77th birthday. The tribute concert included the same setlist as Dylan's 1963 concert at The Town Hall. Buscemi reinterpreted the song as a spoken word track. During his performance of the song, Buscemi told the deceased Ed Sullivan "With all due respect, you blew it, man!"
