= I Shall Be Free =

1963 song by Bob Dylan

Song by Bob Dylan

from the album The Freewheelin' Bob Dylan
- Released: May 27, 1963
- Recorded: December 6, 1962
- Length: 4:48
- Label: Columbia Records
- Songwriter: Bob Dylan
- Producer: John Hammond

"I Shall Be Free" is a song by American singer-songwriter Bob Dylan. It was recorded on 6 December 1962 at Studio A, Columbia Recording Studios, New York, produced by John Hammond. The song was released as the closing track on The Freewheelin' Bob Dylan on 27 May 1963, and has been viewed as a comedic counterpoint to the album's more serious material. Dylan has never performed the song in concert.

== Background and recording ==
"I Shall Be Free" reworks "We Shall Be Free," performed by Lead Belly, Woody Guthrie, Cisco Houston and Sonny Terry during the 1940s, and released in 1944 on the album Leadbelly Sings Folk Songs (accompanied by Guthrie and Terry). That song, credited to Lead Belly, was itself likely an adaptation of a 19th-century spiritual.

Five takes were recorded on 6 December 1962 at Studio A, Columbia Recording Studios, New York, produced by John Hammond, during the last day of recordings for Dylan's second album, The Freewheelin' Bob Dylan, which was released on 27 May 1963. In the following months, Dylan also recorded versions of the song for Broadside and for the music publishers M. Witmark & Sons, the latter released in 2010 on The Bootleg Series Vol. 9: The Witmark Demos: 1962–1964. A mono version of the album track was issued in 2010 on The Original Mono Recordings.

The song is a talking blues, a type of song that Dylan often wrote and performed as he grew on the music scene. Clinton Heylin has speculated that the decision to make it the closing track of The Freewheelin' Bob Dylan was to show that Dylan's music came from an established tradition. It includes lines that seem to be inspired by "Take a Whiff on Me", a song that Heylin says "gave Dylan the necessary licence to get more wacky." There are also similarities between "I Shall Be Free" and Chris Bouchillon's "Talkin' Blues."

"Talkin' Blues" includes the verse:

"Ain't no use me workin' so hard
I got a gal in the rich folks' yard.
They kill a chicken, she sends me the head.
She thinks I'm workin', I'm a-layin' up in bed,
Just dreamin' about her. Havin' a good time,
Two other women"

The original manuscript for "I Shall Be Free" has the following verse, which Heylin says probably also draws from "My Bucket's Got a Hole in It" performed by Hank Williams:

"There ain't no use in me workin' so hard,
I got me a woman who works in the yard.
Rakes the leaves up to her neck,
Every week she sends me a check.
She's a humdinger"

In the album version on The Freewheelin' Bob Dylan, the verse is:

"Oh, there ain't no use in me workin' all the time,
I got a woman who works herself blind.
Works up to her breeches, up to her neck
Writes me letters and sends me checks
(She's a humdinger,
Folk singer)"

On Bob Dylan's official website, the full lyrics to the verse are listed as:

"Oh, there ain't no use in me workin' so heavy
I got a woman who works on the levee
Pumping that water up to her neck
Every week she sends me a monthly check
(She's a humdinger
Folk singer
Dead ringer
For a thing-a-muh jigger)"

The song mentions racism, John F. Kennedy, Mr. Clean, "Little Bo-Peep", Yul Brynner, Elizabeth Taylor, Willie Mays and other popular culture references, and has a verse that is a satirical description of a political candidate seeking election. Paul Williams describes "I Shall Be Free" and "Bob Dylan's Blues" as "entirely frivolous," and suggests that they may have been included for "comic relief" as a contrast to the album's more substantial content. Oliver Trager says that "I Shall Be Free" provides "anticlimatic levity to an otherwise serious album," a point also made by Todd Harvey. A similar sentiment was expressed by Robert Shelton, who dismissed the song as "a decided anticlimax. Although the album has at least a half dozen blockbusters, two of the weakest songs are tucked in at the end, like shirttails."

Dylan has never performed "I Shall Be Free" in concert. He later released "I Shall Be Free No. 10" on Another Side of Bob Dylan in 1964, a track title that Michael Gray says shows Dylan acknowledging the historical lineage of both of his similarly titled songs.

== Personnel ==
The personnel involved in the December 1962 recording session at Studio A, Columbia Recording Studios, New York, are:

Musician

- Bob Dylan – vocals, rhythm guitar, harmonica

Technical

- John Hammond – production
- George Knuerr, Pete Daurier – engineering

== Official releases ==
- The Freewheelin' Bob Dylan (released 1963)
- The Original Mono Recordings (released 2010)
- The Bootleg Series Vol. 9: The Witmark Demos: 1962–1964 (released 2010)
