= Down the Highway =

Down the Highway may refer to:

- Down the Highway (album), a 1980 compilation album by Jim Croce
- "Down the Highway" (song) by Bob Dylan, from his 1963 album The Freewheelin' Bob Dylan
  - Down the Highway: The Life of Bob Dylan, a 2001 biography of Dylan written by Howard Sounes
