= The 50th Anniversary Collection =

50th Anniversary Collection

Compilation album by Bob Dylan
- Released: December 27, 2012
- Recorded: January 29 – December 6, 1962
- Studio: New York City
- Genre: Folk rock
- Length: 275:21
- Label: Sony
- Producers: John H. Hammond; Tom Wilson

Bob Dylan chronology
Tempest (2012)	50th Anniversary Collection (2012)	The Bootleg Series Vol. 10 (2013)

The 50th Anniversary Collection: The Copyright Extension Collection, Volume 1 is the first collection by Bob Dylan that Sony Music released to prevent the recordings from legally entering the public domain in Europe. The album features studio and live recordings from 1962 that have not previously been commercially released. Sony reportedly released only 100 copies each of the four-CD-R "1962" set. The set was released only in Europe.

== Track listing ==
Disc one
No.	Title	Length
1.	"Going Down to New Orleans" (Take 1)	3:24
2.	"Going Down to New Orleans" (Take 2)	3:11
3.	"Sally Gal" (Take 2)	2:45
4.	"Sally Gal" (Take 3)	2:32
5.	"Rambling Gambling Willie" (Take 1)	4:32
6.	"Rambling Gambling Willie" (Take 3)	4:37
7.	"Corrina, Corrina" (Take 1)	3:21
8.	"Corrina, Corrina" (Take 2)	3:14
9.	"The Death of Emmett Till" (Take 1)	4:25
10.	"(I Heard That) Lonesome Whistle" (Take 2)	2:07
11.	"Rocks and Gravel (Solid Road)" (Take 3)	2:58
12.	"Sally Gal" (Take 4)	3:12
13.	"Sally Gal" (Take 5)	1:56
14.	"Baby, Please Don't Go" (Take 1)	2:08
15.	"Baby, Please Don't Go" (Take 3)	1:58
16.	"Milk Cow (Calf's) Blues (Good Morning Blues)" (Take 1)	2:03
17.	"Milk Cow (Calf's) Blues (Good Morning Blues)" (Take 3)	2:33
18.	"Wichita Blues (Going to Louisiana)" (Take 2)	3:06
19.	"Talkin' Bear Mountain Picnic Massacre Blues" (Take 2 (Note: This track is a duplicate of track #21 by mistake. It was supposed to be the same take of the song as on The Bootleg Series Volumes 1–3 (Rare & Unreleased) 1961–1991.))	2:59
20.	"Milk Cow (Calf's) Blues (Good Morning Blues)" (Take 4)	2:48
21.	"Wichita Blues (Going to Louisiana)" (Take 2)	2:59
22.	"Baby, I'm in the Mood for You" (Take 2)	2:58
23.	"Blowin' in the Wind" (Take 1)	2:37
24.	"Blowin' in the Wind" (Take 2)	2:48
25.	"Worried Blues" (Take 1)	2:38
26.	"Baby, I'm in the Mood for You" (Take 4)	2:50
Total length:		76:39

- Tracks 1–10 recorded 24 April 1962 at 1st The Freewheelin' Bob Dylan session
- Tracks 11–21 recorded 25 April 1962 at 2nd The Freewheelin' Bob Dylan session
- Tracks 22–26 recorded 9 July 1962 at 3rd The Freewheelin' Bob Dylan session

Disc two
No.	Title	Length
1.	"Bob Dylan's Blues" (Take 2)	3:26
2.	"Bob Dylan's Blues" (Take 3)	2:19
3.	"Corrina, Corrina" (Take 2)	2:17
4.	"Corrina, Corrina" (Take 3)	2:46
5.	"That's All Right, Mama" (Take 1)	3:23
6.	"That's All Right, Mama" (Take 3)	2:54
7.	"That's All Right, Mama" (Take 5)	2:54
8.	"Mixed Up Confusion" (Take 3)	2:36
9.	"Mixed Up Confusion" (Take 5)	2:41
10.	"Mixed Up Confusion" (Take 6)	2:34
11.	"Mixed Up Confusion" (Take 7)	2:30
12.	"Mixed Up Confusion" (Take 9)	2:22
13.	"Mixed Up Confusion" (Take 10)	2:15
14.	"Mixed Up Confusion" (Take 11)	2:17
15.	"That's All Right, Mama" (Take 3)	2:53
16.	"Rocks And Gravel (Solid Road)" (Take 2)	2:29
17.	"Ballad of Hollis Brown" (Take 2)	5:17
18.	"Kingsport Town" (Take 1)	1:42
19.	"When Death Comes Creepin' (Whatcha Gonna Do?)" (Take 1)	3:06
20.	"Hero Blues" (Take 1)	2:53
21.	"When Death Comes Creepin' (Whatcha Gonna Do?)" (Take 1)	2:01
22.	"I Shall Be Free" (Take 3)	2:44
23.	"I Shall Be Free" (Take 5)	4:29
24.	"Hero Blues" (Take 2)	3:02
25.	"Hero Blues" (Take 4)	2:43
Total length:		70:33

- Tracks 1–2 recorded 9 July 1962 at 3rd The Freewheelin' Bob Dylan session
- Tracks 3–9 recorded 26 October 1962 at 4th The Freewheelin' Bob Dylan session
- Tracks 10–16 recorded 1 November 1962 at 5th The Freewheelin' Bob Dylan session
- Tracks 17–19 recorded 14 November 1962 at 6th The Freewheelin' Bob Dylan session
- tracks 20–25 recorded 6 December 1962 at 7th The Freewheelin' Bob Dylan session

Disc three
No.	Title	Length
1.	"Hard Times in New York Town"	1:56
2.	"The Death of Emmett Till"	4:24
3.	"I Rode Out One Morning"	2:51
4.	"House of the Rising Sun"	3:16
5.	"See That My Grave Is Kept Clean"	0:55
6.	"Ballad of Donald White"	4:36
7.	"Honey, Just Allow Me One More Chance"	2:27
8.	"Talkin' New York"	4:25
9.	"Corrina, Corrina"	3:53
10.	"Deep Ellum Blues"	3:29
11.	"Blowin' in the Wind"	3:06
12.	"The Death of Emmett Till"	4:39
13.	"Stealin'"	2:18
14.	"Hiram Hubbard"	5:12
15.	"Blowin' in the Wind"	3:59
16.	"Rocks and Gravel"	4:48
17.	"Quit Your Low Down Ways"	3:10
18.	"He Was a Friend of Mine"	4:02
19.	"Let Me Die in My Footsteps"	4:58
20.	"Two Trains Runnin'"	4:00
21.	"Ramblin' on My Mind"	2:50
22.	"Muleskinner Blues"	1:11
23.	"Muleskinner Blues (Part 2)"	1:31
Total length:		77:56

- Tracks 1–2 from the Mackenzie Home Tapes, recorded 29 January 1962
- Tracks 3–6 from the Mackenzie Home Tapes, recorded Fall 1962
- Tracks 7–11 recorded 16 April 1962 at Gerde's Folk City
- Tracks 12–23 recorded 2 July 1962 at Finjan Club, Montreal

Disc four
No.	Title	Length
1.	"Sally Gal"	2:59
2.	"Highway 51"	4:02
3.	"Talking John Birch Paranoid Blues"	4:50
4.	"Ballad of Hollis Brown"	5:48
5.	"A Hard Rain's A-Gonna Fall"	7:06
6.	"See That My Grave Is Kept Clean"	3:25
7.	"No More Auction Block"	2:54
8.	"Motherless Children"	3:09
9.	"Kind Hearted Woman Blues"	2:29
10.	"Black Cross"	3:59
11.	"Ballad of Hollis Brown"	5:41
12.	"Ain't No More Cane"	1:58
Total length:		48:20

- Tracks 1–5 recorded 22 September 1962 at the Carnegie Hall Hootenanny
- Tracks 6–12 recorded 15 October 1962 at the Gaslight Cafe

== See also ==
- The Beatles Bootleg Recordings 1963, 2013 compilation of recordings by The Beatles also released to prevent recordings from entering the public domain
- Ashcan copy, comic book industry term for a work published solely for copyright purposes
