= The 1974 Live Recordings =

Compilation album by Bob Dylan and the Band

Live album by Bob Dylan and The Band
- Released: September 20, 2024
- Recorded: January 3, 1974 – February 14, 1974
- Genres: Folk rock; country rock
- Length: 1736:25
- Label: Columbia
- Producer: Steve Berkowitz

Bob Dylan chronology
The Complete Budokan 1978 (2023)	The 1974 Live Recordings (2024)	The Bootleg Series Vol. 18: Through the Open Window 1956–1963 (2025)

The Band chronology
And Then There Were Four: FM Broadcast, Chicago 1983 (2015)	The 1974 Live Recordings (2024)

The 1974 Live Recordings is a 27-CD boxset of live recordings from Bob Dylan and the Band's 1974 tour of the US and Canada, released in September 2024 by Legacy Records. The compilation includes every known soundboard recording of the tour, the majority of which were previously unreleased. The compilation includes the full concerts from which songs were selected for the 1974 Before the Flood live album. The compilation omits recordings of the Band's songs, also performed at these shows without Dylan.

== Background ==
The compilation was released on the 50th anniversary of the tour to prevent the recordings from entering the European public domain, in the same manner as Dylan's earlier The 1966 Live Recordings (2016) compilation.

== Promotion ==
The compilation was announced on July 9, 2024, with a live performance of "Forever Young" (recorded at the Seattle Center Coliseum on February 9, 1974) being released as the first single. Further singles included performances of "It's All Over Now, Baby Blue" (recorded on February 14 at the LA Forum), and of "Just Like Tom Thumb's Blues" (recorded on January 30 at Madison Square Garden).

Also announced was an abridged compilation released by Third Man Records. Titled The 1974 Live Recordings – The Missing Songs From Before the Flood, it was a 3-LP set that included recordings of Dylan's songs that were omitted from the original 1974 Before the Flood album.

== Reception ==
Professional ratings
Review scores
Source	Rating
AllMusic	4/5 stars
Mojo Magazine	4/5 stars
Rolling Stone	3.5/5 stars
Uncut	4/5 stars

The 1974 Live Recordings currently maintains an 80% positive ("Generally favorable") rating at Metacritic.
