= Honey, Just Allow Me One More Chance =

"Honey, Won't You Allow Me One More Chance"

Single by Henry Thomas
- B-side: "Run, Mollie, Run"
- Released: 1927
- Recorded: Chicago, October 7, 1927
- Genre: Texas blues
- Length: 2:53
- Label: Vocalion
- Songwriter: Unknown

"Honey, Just Allow Me One More Chance" is a song recorded by blues musician Henry "Ragtime Texas" Thomas in 1927, under the title "Honey, Won't You Allow Me One More Chance". It was covered by Bob Dylan on his album The Freewheelin' Bob Dylan, which came out on May 27, 1963.

In 1962, Origin Jazz Library released the album Henry Thomas Sings the Texas Blues. It included his "Honey, Won't You Allow Me One More Chance", which was presumably the source of Dylan's version.

Todd Harvey, in his book The Formative Dylan: Transmission and Stylistic Influences, 1961–1963, analyzes how Dylan dropped Thomas's verses, and adapted his choruses, utilizing Thomas's AAAC rhyming structure and four 4-bar phrases in 2/4 time. Harvey writes: "The text of Thomas's chorus remained constant throughout the song. Dylan wrote, for the most part, new text resulting in a four bar phrase verse with the fourth phrase acting as a refrain. He increased Thomas's tempo and added his own guitar accompaniment, placing harmonica solos between verses."

== Recordings ==
- 1927 – Henry Thomas, 78 rpm Vocalion 1141
- 1963 – Bob Dylan, on the album The Freewheelin' Bob Dylan
- 1970 – Flatt and Scruggs, on the album Final Fling
- 2000 – Fernando Goin, on the album Mystery Train
- 2011 - Rory Mcleod, on BCC Radio 2's album The Freewheelin' Bob Dylan: A Folk Tribute
