= The Bootleg Series Vol. 9: The Witmark Demos: 1962–1964 =

Compilation album by Bob Dylan
- Released: October 19, 2010
- Recorded: 1962–1964
- Genre: Folk
- Length: 138:28
- Label: Columbia
- Producers: Stan Berkowitz; Jeff Rosen

Bob Dylan chronology
Christmas in the Heart (2009)	The Bootleg Series Vol. 9: The Witmark Demos: 1962–1964 (2010)	The Original Mono Recordings (2010)

Bob Dylan Bootleg Series chronology
Vol. 8: Tell Tale Signs: Rare and Unreleased 1989–2006 (2008)	Vol. 9: The Witmark Demos: 1962–1964 (2010)	Vol. 10: Another Self Portrait (1969–1971) (2013)

The Bootleg Series Vol. 9: The Witmark Demos: 1962–1964 is a compilation album by American singer-songwriter Bob Dylan, containing demo recordings he made for his first two publishing companies, Leeds Music and M. Witmark & Sons, from 1962 to 1964. The seventh installment of the ongoing Bob Dylan Bootleg Series, it was released on October 19, 2010, on Legacy Records.

It features 47 tracks with Dylan accompanying himself on acoustic guitar, harmonica and occasionally piano. The recordings were only available on pirate recordings until 1991; three of these recordings appeared on the first volume of the series. A fourth demo of "Don't Think Twice, It's All Right" was included on The Bootleg Series Vol. 7: No Direction Home: The Soundtrack. While Dylan recorded subsequent versions of most of the songs, the album features 15 that were produced exclusively as demos and had never been heard before except as bootlegs.

The Witmark Demos was released in two formats: the standard two-disc set common to the rest of the series; and a four album set. Both releases featured a booklet with an account on the album's significance by historian Colin Escott, along with photos of Dylan from the period when the demos were recorded. The album peaked at number 12 on the Billboard 200 albums chart in its first week, becoming Dylan's 20th album to debut in the top 20.

== Background ==
=== Leeds Music demos ===
Dylan recorded his debut album, Bob Dylan, for Columbia Records in November 1961, when he was 20. The album included two original tracks, "Song to Woody" and "Talkin' New York", the first songs he had written after arriving in New York City's Greenwich Village in January 1961. In addition, Dylan recorded one other original during the Columbia sessions, "Man on the Street", which did not appear on the album.

Based on the songs Dylan was writing, his producer at Columbia, John Hammond, arranged for the young artist to meet with Lou Levy at Leeds Music Publishing. Dylan was offered a $100 advance ($1,077 in 2025) and signed with a Leeds subsidiary, Duchess Music, on January 5, 1962. In addition to agreeing to publish Dylan's songs and pay royalties on sales by other artists, Levy suggested the possibility of producing a songbook once they had enough material, a prospect that excited Dylan as much as anything else. Dylan returned to Leeds the next week and recorded five songs in one demo session: "Poor Boy Blues", "Ballad for a Friend", "Rambling, Gambling Willie", "Talking Bear Mountain Picnic Massacre Blues", and "Standing on the Highway". To this he added the two songs from the Columbia sessions that were not used on his album. After signing with Leeds, Dylan pursued songwriting with a new vigor. As he reflected later, "I wrote wherever I happened to be. Sometimes I'd spend a whole day sitting at a corner table in a coffeehouse, just writing whatever came into my head."

=== M. Witmark & Sons demos ===
In the spring of 1962, folk music manager Albert Grossman began to take an active interest in Dylan. One of the organizers of the first Newport Folk Festival in 1959 and manager of a small stable of folksingers, Grossman had recently launched a new act composed of three musicians he had handpicked, Peter, Paul & Mary. Grossman had been watching Dylan from the sidelines for nearly a year and played a peripheral part in some of the events leading up to his contract with Columbia. While Grossman was negotiating Peter, Paul & Mary's contract with Warner Bros. Records, he closed a unique arrangement with Music Publishers' Holding Company (MPHC), a Warner-owned operation that was the industry's leading publisher. The deal, finalized that spring, gave Grossman half of MPHC's royalties share for any artist he could sign to a publishing contract. Dylan became his first prospect.

Grossman proposed that Dylan sign with the prestigious publisher M. Witmark & Sons, one of MPHC's eight subsidiaries. After playing some songs for Witmark executive Artie Mogull, Dylan mentioned a complication: he was already under contract with Leeds/Duchess. Dylan was given $1,000 in early July 1962 ($10,768.27 in 2025) and approached Leeds about buying out his contract. Since the folksinger had yet to produce any sales, Leeds accepted the money and released Dylan from the agreement. Dylan signed a new contract with Witmark on July 12 and immediately recorded a demo of what would become his breakthrough song, "Blowin' in the Wind". Four months passed before Dylan returned to record another song, "Ye Playboys and Playgirls", but the next month, in December, he showed up with seven new compositions, including three that would become classics: "A Hard Rain's a-Gonna Fall", "Ballad of Hollis Brown", and "Tomorrow Is a Long Time".

In all, Dylan visited Witmark about a dozen times, registering his last demos in mid-1964. He recorded a total of 39 songs for Witmark, all of which are included on The Bootleg Series Vol. 9: The Witmark Demos, along with the eight recordings originally registered with Leeds. Besides early versions of many of his classics, as well as rarities that have appeared on other editions of The Bootleg Series, the set includes 15 songs, an album's worth of material, that had never been officially released in any form.

== Production ==
The recordings for the Leeds and Witmark demos were never intended for public consumption, but were made to sell Dylan's songs to other artists. The demo sessions took place in a tiny 6-by-8-foot studio at Witmark's offices in the Look Building at 51st Street and Madison Avenue, where an engineer would capture the performances on a reel-to-reel. To save tape, the demos were recorded at 7.5 inches per second, half the speed used in professional studios. A Witmark copyist would then transcribe the lyrics and music from the tape, and song sheets would be printed and mailed to recording companies. When a company's artist expressed an interest in a song, Witmark would cut an acetate, a recording on inexpensive plastic, that would be sent to the artist for preview purposes. If acceptable, the song would be recorded.

== Royalties ==
Royalties from sales of the songs were paid to Witmark, which gave Dylan two cents per record and split its two-cent share with Grossman. In addition, Grossman received 25% of Dylan's payments under the terms of their management contract, which was signed on August 20, 1962, six weeks after the Witmark agreement. Dylan and Grossman subsequently set up their own publishing company, Dwarf Music, in a contract signed in mid-1965 but back-dated to January of that year By late 1965, more than a year after the last of the Witmark demos, Music Publishers' Holding Company reported in Billboard that at least 237 recordings had been made of Dylan's songs under the copyrights it held.

== Demo session dates ==
While the recording dates of the Leeds and Witmark Demos had previously been published, they were not included in the information distributed with the CD or LP. On disc 1, tracks 1–8 are from the demos recorded at Leeds Music on February 2, 1962. Track 9, a demo of "Blowin' in the Wind" and the first song recorded for Witmark is from July 1962. Track 10 was recorded on November 1, 1962, followed by tracks 11–17, which were recorded in December 1962. Tracks 18–22 were registered as recorded in winter 1963, probably February. Tracks 23–25 of disc 1 and tracks 1–2 of disc 2 were recorded in March 1963. Tracks 3–6 date from April 1963, 7–9 from May 1963, and 10–15 were all recorded in August 1963. Track 16, "The Times They Are a-Changin'", was recorded in October 1963, and Track 17 is from December 1963. Tracks 18–19 were the last demos recorded at the Witmark studio, in January 1964. Tracks 20–22 were registered to Witmark in June 1964, though they had been recorded elsewhere.

== Critical reception ==
Professional ratings
Aggregate scores
Source	Rating
Metacritic	88/100
Review scores
Source	Rating
AllMusic	4.5/5 stars
The Austin Chronicle	5/5 stars
The A.V. Club	A
Classic Rock	4.5/5 stars
The Guardian	4/5 stars
Mojo	4/5 stars
Pitchfork	9.1/10
PopMatters	8/10
Tiny Mix Tapes	4/5 stars
Uncut	4/5 stars

Witmark Demos received positive responses from critics. It achieved an 88% positive ("Universal acclaim") at Metacritic based on reviews by 13 critics. AllMusic critic Stephen Thomas Erlewine said about the songs on Witmark Demos: "they’ve never been presented as completely and in as great fidelity as they are on this two-disc set."

== Track listing ==
All tracks are written by Bob Dylan, except "Baby, Let Me Follow You Down", written by Eric Von Schmidt, Reverend Gary Davis, and Dave Van Ronk.

Disc one
No.	Title	Length
1.	"Man on the Street" (fragment)	1:07
2.	"Hard Times in New York Town"	1:57
3.	"Poor Boy Blues"	3:01
4.	"Ballad for a Friend"	2:23
5.	"Rambling, Gambling Willie"	3:38
6.	"Talking Bear Mountain Picnic Massacre Blues"	3:42
7.	"Standing on the Highway"	2:32
8.	"Man on the Street"	1:30
9.	"Blowin' in the Wind"	2:38
10.	"Long Ago, Far Away"	2:29
11.	"A Hard Rain's a-Gonna Fall"	6:49
12.	"Tomorrow Is a Long Time"	3:46
13.	"The Death of Emmett Till"	4:32
14.	"Let Me Die in My Footsteps"	1:37
15.	"Ballad of Hollis Brown"	4:08
16.	"Quit Your Low Down Ways"	2:50
17.	"Baby, I'm in the Mood for You"	1:36
18.	"Bound to Lose, Bound to Win"	1:19
19.	"All Over You"	3:52
20.	"I'd Hate to Be You on That Dreadful Day"	2:00
21.	"Long Time Gone"	3:46
22.	"Talkin' John Birch Paranoid Blues"	3:17
23.	"Masters of War"	4:23
24.	"Oxford Town"	2:33
25.	"Farewell"	3:58
Total length:		75:23

Disc two
No.	Title	Length
1.	"Don't Think Twice, It's All Right"	3:38
2.	"Walkin' Down the Line"	3:23
3.	"I Shall Be Free"	4:30
4.	"Bob Dylan's Blues"	1:58
5.	"Bob Dylan's Dream"	3:53
6.	"Boots of Spanish Leather"	5:49
7.	"Girl from the North Country"	3:09
8.	"Seven Curses"	3:13
9.	"Hero Blues"	1:36
10.	"Whatcha Gonna Do?"	3:36
11.	"Gypsy Lou"	3:45
12.	"Ain't Gonna Grieve"	1:28
13.	"John Brown"	4:19
14.	"Only a Hobo"	2:25
15.	"When the Ship Comes In"	2:56
16.	"The Times They Are a-Changin'"	3:03
17.	"Paths of Victory"	4:11
18.	"Guess I'm Doing Fine"	4:08
19.	"Baby, Let Me Follow You Down"	1:56
20.	"Mama, You Been on My Mind"	2:14
21.	"Mr. Tambourine Man"	5:55
22.	"I'll Keep It with Mine"	3:34
Total length:		74:39

Notes:

- "Don't Think Twice It's All Right" was previously included on The Bootleg Series Vol. 7: No Direction Home: The Soundtrack
- "Walkin' Down the Line", "When the Ship Comes In", and "The Times They Are A-Changin'" were previously included on The Bootleg Series Volumes 1-3 (Rare & Unreleased) 1961-1991

=== Limited Edition bonus disc: In Concert – Brandeis University 1963 ===
The In Concert – Brandeis University 1963 disc was given as a limited edition bonus with purchases of Bootleg Series Vol. 9 or Original Mono Recordings at a variety of retailers.

== Charts ==
Chart performance for The Bootleg Series Vol. 9: The Witmark Demos: 1962–1964
Chart (2010)	Peak position
Australian Albums (ARIA)	36
Austrian Albums (Ö3 Austria)	46
Belgian Albums (Ultratop Flanders)	24
Belgian Albums (Ultratop Wallonia)	64
Danish Albums (Hitlisten)	22
Dutch Albums (Album Top 100)	19
European Albums (Billboard)	13
French Albums (SNEP)	56
German Albums (Offizielle Top 100)	24
Italian Albums (FIMI)	26
New Zealand Albums (RMNZ)	23
Norwegian Albums (VG-lista)	5
Spanish Albums (Promusicae)	32
Swedish Albums (Sverigetopplistan)	5
Swiss Albums (Schweizer Hitparade)	21
UK Albums (OCC)	18
US Billboard 200	12
