= Talkin' World War III Blues =

Song by Bob Dylan

from the album The Freewheelin' Bob Dylan
- Released: May 27, 1963
- Recorded: April 24, 1963
- Genre: Talking blues
- Length: 6:28
- Label: Columbia Records
- Songwriter: Bob Dylan
- Producers: John H. Hammond; Tom Wilson

"Talkin' World War III Blues" is a song written and performed by the American singer-songwriter Bob Dylan that was first released as the tenth track (or the fourth song on Side 2 of the vinyl) of his 1963 album The Freewheelin' Bob Dylan. Like nearly every song on the album, it is performed by Dylan solo, accompanying himself on acoustic guitar and harmonica played in a rack.

== Background and recording ==
"Talkin' World War III Blues" belongs to the comical "talking blues" genre that was popularized by Dylan's idol Woody Guthrie. It was one of the last songs recorded for The Freewheelin' Bob Dylan and was a replacement for "Talkin' John Birch Paranoid Blues", which had been rejected by Columbia Records. The song is a satire of the Cold War and then-pervasive fears and anxieties held by many Americans about the possibility of a third World War. In their book Bob Dylan All the Songs: The Story Behind Every Track, authors Philippe Margotin and Jean-Michel Guesdon note that Dylan "denounces the weaknesses" of and ridicules everyone in the song: psychiatrists, conservatives and even the narrator himself.

== Live performances ==
Dylan played the song no fewer than 31 times in concert between 1963 and 1965 (the exact number is not known because not all of his set lists from this era are extant). A live version from 1963 was officially released on the album In Concert – Brandeis University 1963. A partial version of a live performance from 1965, with altered lyrics that reference T. S. Eliot and Donovan, can be seen in D. A. Pennebaker's 1967 documentary Don't Look Back.

Dylan frequently altered the song's topical and literary references in live performance. The "Rock-A-Day Johnny" passage in the studio recording was rewritten in different performances to refer to Fabian, Martha and the Vandellas, and Donovan. Dylan similarly varied the attribution of the saying near the song's conclusion: Abraham Lincoln in the recorded version was replaced in different performances by Carl Sandburg, Robert Frost, and T. S. Eliot.

== References in popular culture ==
Beyoncé Knowles quoted a lyric from the song ("I'll let you be in my dream if I can be in yours") on Instagram when she was preparing her self-titled 2013 album Beyoncé.

Actress/singer Rita Wilson references the same line in the lyrics of her 2020 single "I Wanna Kiss Bob Dylan" ("Would it hurt so good when he says goodbye / Sayin' I'll be in your dreams if you'll be in mine").
