= Don't Think Twice, It's All Right =

1963 single by Bob Dylan

Single by Bob Dylan

from the album The Freewheelin' Bob Dylan
- A-side: "Blowin' in the Wind"
- Released: August 1963
- Genre: Country folk
- Length: 3:40
- Label: Columbia
- Songwriter: Bob Dylan
- Producer: John Hammond

"Don't Think Twice, It's All Right" is a song written by Bob Dylan in 1962 and released the following year on his second studio album The Freewheelin' Bob Dylan and as the B-side of the single "Blowin' in the Wind". The song has been covered by many other artists, most notably by Peter, Paul and Mary who released it as a single reaching the Top 10 of the Billboard Hot 100.

== Writing ==
In the liner notes to the original release, Nat Hentoff quotes Dylan as saying the song is "a statement that maybe you can say to make yourself feel better ... as if you were talking to yourself". It was written around the time that Suze Rotolo, Dylan's girlfriend at the time, indefinitely prolonged her stay in Italy. The beginning of the melody is based on the public domain traditional song "Who's Gonna Buy Your Chickens When I'm Gone", which was taught to Dylan by folksinger Paul Clayton, who had used it in his song "Who's Gonna Buy You Ribbons When I'm Gone?"

== Lyrics ==
The lyrics of the song are written in four stanzas of eight verses each. Each of the stanzas ends with a one verse repetition of the title sung as a closing verse to each stanza. As well as the beginning of the melody, a couple of lines of lyrics were taken from Clayton's "Who's Gonna Buy You Ribbons When I'm Gone?", which was recorded in 1960, two years before Dylan wrote "Don't Think Twice". Lines taken word-for-word or slightly altered from the Clayton song are, "T'ain't no use to sit and wonder why, darlin'" and "So I'm walkin' down that long, lonesome road." On the first release of the song, instead of "So I'm walkin' down that long, lonesome road babe, where I'm bound, I can't tell" Dylan sings "So long, honey babe, where I'm bound, I can't tell". The lyrics were changed when Dylan performed live versions of the song and on cover versions recorded by other artists.

Jay McDowell writing for American Songwriter recalls that "The album cover of The Freewheelin’ Bob Dylan features the singer and his girlfriend Suze Rotolo walking down a New York City street. Rotolo went to Italy to study at the University of Perugia, leaving Dylan. He wrote the song as if he had left her." In response, McDowell quotes Rotolo responding about the lyrics that: “It is one of those cultural markers that influenced the look of album covers precisely because of its casual, down-home spontaneity and sensibility. Most album covers were carefully staged and controlled, to terrific effect on the Blue Note jazz album covers … and to not-so-great effect on the perfectly posed and clean-cut pop and folk albums. Whoever was responsible for choosing that particular photograph for The Freewheelin’ Bob Dylan really had an eye for a new look." McDowell cautions that the song is best not listened to as a love song so much as the timing of its writing corresponds more to Dylan's break-up with Rotolo.

== Releases ==
In addition to its original release, the song has appeared on several of Dylan's greatest hits compilations, including Bob Dylan's Greatest Hits Vol. II (1971), The Best of Bob Dylan (1997), and The Essential Bob Dylan (2000). Another version of the song, recorded as a demo for Dylan's music publisher M. Witmark & Sons in 1963, was included on two releases in Columbia's Bootleg Series: Vol. 7: No Direction Home: The Soundtrack (2005) and Vol. 9 – The Witmark Demos: 1962–1964 (2010). In addition, live versions have been released on Before the Flood (1974; recorded February 14, 1974), as a reggae rock version on Bob Dylan at Budokan (1978; recorded February 28, 1978), The Bootleg Series Vol. 6: Bob Dylan Live 1964, Concert at Philharmonic Hall (2004; recorded October 31, 1964), Live at The Gaslight 1962 (2005; recorded October 15, 1962), and Live 1962-1966: Rare Performances from the Copyright Collections (2018; recorded April 12, 1963).

== Certifications ==
Region	Certification	Certified units/sales
New Zealand (RMNZ)	Gold	15,000^{‡}
United Kingdom (BPI)	Silver	200,000^{‡}
United States (RIAA)	Platinum	1,000,000^{‡}
^{‡} Sales+streaming figures based on certification alone.

== Cover versions ==
"Don't Think Twice, It's All Right"

Single by Peter, Paul and Mary

from the album In the Wind
- B-side: "Autumn to May"
- Released: 1963
- Recorded: 1963
- Genre: Folk rock
- Length: 3:16
- Label: Warner Bros.
- Songwriter: Bob Dylan
- Producer: Albert Grossman

Peter, Paul and Mary singles chronology
"Blowin' in the Wind" (1963)	"Don't Think Twice, It's All Right" (1963)	"Stewball" (1963)

In 1963, the popular folk trio Peter, Paul and Mary recorded the song. Dylan's manager Albert Grossman also managed Peter, Paul and Mary and started offering Dylan's songs to other artists to record. "Don't Think Twice, It's Alright" was one of three Dylan songs Peter, Paul and Mary picked up that way for their third album In the Wind, "Blowin' in the Wind" and "Quit Your Lowdown Ways" being the others. Released as a single, it reached number nine on the Billboard Hot 100 and number two on its Easy Listening charts. It was this version that popularized the song. Cash Box described it as "an infectious medium-paced country-styled folk item with a haunting, extremely pretty melody" that seemed destined to replicate the success the trio had with "Blowin' in the Wind". AllMusic critic William Ruhlman described the Peter, Paul and Mary version as an "understated rendition" of the song. Radio personality Bob Leszczak describes this version as being done "in typical fashion".

The Four Seasons released a cover of the song as a single in 1965 (with the title "Don't Think Twice") under the pseudonym the Wonder Who? Their "joke" version reached number 12 on the Hot 100, and eventually sold one million copies.

In 1968, Burl Ives covered the song on his album The Times They Are a-Changin'. Show creator and director Rian Johnson chose the Ives version for the final episode ("The Hook") of season one of Poker Face.

Before he became famous, Post Malone uploaded a cover version to YouTube in 2013 under his birth name, performed in an earnest folk style unlike his later work. The video was widely viewed in 2015 after his "White Iverson" video went viral on SoundCloud. Lana Del Rey performed the song on her Norman Fucking Rockwell! tour in 2019, joined by Walkmen singer Hamilton Leithauser in Nashville, Tennessee.

== In popular culture ==
The song was used on the television series Mad Men and Friday Night Lights.

== See also ==
- List of Bob Dylan songs based on earlier tunes
