= Down the Highway (song) =

1963 song by Bob Dylan

Song by Bob Dylan

from the album The Freewheelin' Bob Dylan
- Released: May 27, 1963
- Recorded: July 9, 1962
- Genre: Twelve-bar blues
- Length: 3:23
- Label: Columbia
- Songwriter(s): Bob Dylan
- Producer(s): John Hammond

"Down the Highway" is a song by American singer-songwriter Bob Dylan. It was recorded on July 9, 1962 at Studio A, Columbia Recording Studios, New York, produced by John Hammond. The song was released on The Freewheelin' Bob Dylan on May 27, 1963. It is a twelve-bar blues love song, which Dylan told his girlfriend Suze Rotolo he had written about her.

== Background and recording ==
Dylan wrote to his girlfriend Suze Rotolo in July 1962, mentioning that "Down the Highway" was one of two songs in a recent recording session that referred to her. Rotolo was studying in Perugia, Italy, having left in June, and the song contains the lines "My baby took my heart from me / She packed it all up in a suitcase / Lord, she took it away to Italy, Italy." The song is a Twelve-bar blues, which may have been inspired by the work of Robert Johnson and Big Joe Williams; Dylan's delivery of some of the lines recalls Williams, according to Philippe Margotin and Jean-Michel Guesdon.

"Down the Highway" was recorded in one take on July 9, 1962 at Studio A, Columbia Recording Studios, New York, produced by John Hammond, during the third recording session for Dylan's second album, The Freewheelin' Bob Dylan, which was released on May 27, 1963. At some time between October 1962 and January 1963, Dylan recorded a version of the song for Broadside. A mono version of the album track was issued in 2010 on The Original Mono Recordings.

Paul Williams says that of six "love songs of one sort or another" recorded by Dylan in July 1962, all of which show a blues influence, "Down the Highway," a song about loneliness, is the only one of them that "expresses real distress." Oliver Trager praised the "cathartic" vocals and "Dylan's astounding guitar pattern" on the track. Chick Ober, reviewing The Freewheelin' Bob Dylan for the Tampa Bay Times, selected the track as one of the best three on the album.

In the sleeve notes of The Freewheelin' Bob Dylan, concerning "Down the Highway," Dylan explained to Nat Hentoff: "What made the real blues singers so great is that they were able to state all the problems they had; but at the same time, they were standing outside of them and could look at them. And in that way, they had them beat." Dylan has never performed the song live. (Note: Trager claims that Dylan performed the song at one show in the United Kingdom in 1964, but this is not corroborated by other sources.) Howard Sounes titled his biography of Dylan Down the Highway: the Life of Bob Dylan.

== Personnel ==
The personnel for the July 9, 1962 recordings at Studio A, Columbia Recording Studios, New York, are listed below. The album track duration is 3:23.

Musician

- Bob Dylan – vocals, rhythm guitar

Technical

- John Hammond – production
- George Knuerr, Pete Daurier – engineering

== Official releases ==
- The Freewheelin' Bob Dylan (released 1963)
- The Original Mono Recordings (released 2010)
