= Bob Dylan's Blues =

Song by Bob Dylan

from the album The Freewheelin' Bob Dylan
- Released: May 27, 1963
- Recorded: July 9, 1962
- Genre: Folk
- Length: 2:23
- Label: Columbia Records
- Songwriter: Bob Dylan
- Producers: John H. Hammond; Tom Wilson

"Bob Dylan's Blues" is a song written and performed by the American singer-songwriter Bob Dylan, that was first released as the fifth track on his 1963 album, The Freewheelin' Bob Dylan.

== Recording sessions ==
"Bob Dylan's Blues" was recorded on July 9, 1962, during the third Freewheelin' session. Dylan recorded several new compositions that day, including "Blowin' in the Wind", a song he had already performed live but had yet to record in the studio. Other tracks recorded during the session included "Down the Highway," and "Honey, Just Allow Me One More Chance". Master takes of the four songs were selected and set aside for the final album.

Dylan later recorded the song as a demo for his music publisher, M. Witmark & Sons. This version, taped in April 1963 at Witmark's studio, was officially released in October 2010 on The Bootleg Series Vol. 9 – The Witmark Demos: 1962–1964.
