= The Bootleg Series Vol. 7: No Direction Home: The Soundtrack =

Compilation album and soundtrack by Bob Dylan
- Released: August 30, 2005
- Recorded: 1959–1966
- Genres: Folk rock; rock and roll
- Length: 144:31
- Label: Columbia
- Producers: Steve Berkowitz; Bruce Dickinson; Jeff Rosen; Martin Scorsese

Bob Dylan chronology
The Bootleg Series Vol. 6: Bob Dylan Live 1964, Concert at Philharmonic Hall (2004)	The Bootleg Series Vol. 7: No Direction Home: The Soundtrack (2005)	Live at The Gaslight 1962 (2005)

Bob Dylan Bootleg Series chronology
Vol. 6: Bob Dylan Live 1964, Concert at Philharmonic Hall (2004)	Vol. 7: No Direction Home: The Soundtrack (2005)	Vol. 8: Tell Tale Signs: Rare and Unreleased 1989–2006 (2008)

Professional ratings
Review scores
Source	Rating
Allmusic	4/5 stars
Drowned in Sound	9/10
The Encyclopedia of Popular Music	4/5 stars
Music Box	5/5 stars
Static and Feedback	(not rated)
Pitchfork Media	9.3/10
Tiny Mix Tapes	4.5/5 stars

The Bootleg Series Vol. 7: No Direction Home: The Soundtrack is a compilation album by Bob Dylan. The fifth installment in the ongoing Bob Dylan Bootleg Series, it was released in 2005 in conjunction with the Martin Scorsese PBS television documentary on Dylan, No Direction Home, and was compiled with Scorsese's input. It features mostly previously unreleased material from Dylan's formative years to his rise as an international figure, from 1959 to his 1966 world tour.

The Bootleg Series Vol. 7: No Direction Home: The Soundtrack fared well commercially, debuting on the Billboard 200 album chart on September 17, 2005 at number 16, with sales of 50,987 copies. It remained on the chart for 11 weeks. It was certified a gold record on October 21, 2005 by the RIAA. It also reached number 21 in the UK.

== Preparation ==
The project eventually titled as No Direction Home began to take form in 1995 when Dylan's manager, Jeff Rosen, began scheduling interviews with Dylan's friends and associates. Among those interviewed were poet Allen Ginsberg and folk musician Dave Van Ronk, both of whom died before the film was ever completed. Dylan's old girlfriend Suze Rotolo also granted a rare interview, and she later told Rolling Stone that she was very pleased with the project's results. Dylan himself also sat for ten hours in a relaxed and open conversation with Rosen in 2000.

According to Rolling Stone, an unnamed source close to the project claimed that Dylan himself had no involvement with the project apart from the interview, saying that "[Dylan] has no interest in this … Bob truly does not look back." However, work on the first installment of Dylan's autobiography, Chronicles, Vol. 1, did overlap production of the project, though it is unclear how much, if any, influence Chronicles may have had on No Direction Home.

Though raw material was being gathered for the project, Rosen needed someone to edit and shape it into a quality picture, and celebrated filmmaker Martin Scorsese was approached to "direct" the documentary planned from the project. Scorsese eventually agreed and came aboard in 2001.

In the meantime, Dylan's office gathered hundreds of hours of historical film footage dating from the time covered in No Direction Home. These included a scratchy recording of Dylan's high school rock band, his 1965 screen test for Andy Warhol, and newly discovered footage of the famous Manchester, England concert from May 17, 1966, when an angry fan called out "Judas!" just before Dylan and the Hawks performed "Like a Rolling Stone". Shot by D. A. Pennebaker, the onstage, color footage was found in 2004 in a pile of water-damaged film recovered from Dylan's vaults.

At the same time, musical recordings from Dylan's archives were also being explored for an accompanying soundtrack. As originally planned, the soundtrack included live performances featured in the film, such as Dylan's first live electric performance—"Maggie's Farm", backed by the Paul Butterfield Blues Band—at the 1965 Newport Folk Festival. Producer Steve Berkowitz helped create the first multitrack mix of this performance which was ultimately used for the soundtrack, saying "it's raw, it's punk rock...There was nothing overdubbed, nothing changed. Everything in the soundtrack was mixed and mastered to sound like it sounded then." Many performances could not be remixed, including a 1966 performance of "Ballad of a Thin Man" which was taken from a mono recording, the only one ever made. "It's totally distorto, but I love it," says Berkowitz. "Talk about verite—it's [absolutely] perfect." Despite the praise, the recording appears in "fake" stereo on the compilation.

However, as the soundtrack was compiled, it was eventually decided to include material that was not featured in the documentary, including many previously unreleased studio outtakes.

== Track listing ==
All tracks are written by Bob Dylan, except where noted.

Disc one
No.	Title	Writer(s)	Note	Length
1.	"When I Got Troubles" (1959)		Recorded by Dylan's high school friend Ric Kangas	1:31
2.	"Rambler, Gambler" (Home recording)	Traditional, arranged Bob Dylan	Recorded in late 1960 by Cleve Petterson	2:28
3.	"This Land Is Your Land" (Live version)	Woody Guthrie	Recorded live in New York City on November 4, 1961	5:58
4.	"Song to Woody"		Originally released in March 1962 on Bob Dylan	2:42
5.	"Dink's Song" (Minnesota Hotel Tape)	Traditional, arranged Bob Dylan		4:38
6.	"I Was Young When I Left Home" (Minnesota Hotel Tape)		Above two recorded on December 22, 1961 in Minneapolis	5:25
7.	"Sally Gal"		Outtake from The Freewheelin' Bob Dylan, recorded on April 24, 1962	2:38
8.	"Don't Think Twice, It's All Right" (Witmark demo)		Recorded in New York City in March 1963	3:36
9.	"Man of Constant Sorrow"	Traditional, arranged Bob Dylan	Recorded in March 1963 for the TV broadcast Folk Songs and More Folk Songs	3:24
10.	"Blowin' in the Wind" (live)			4:24
11.	"Masters of War" (live)		Above two recorded at Town Hall in New York City on April 12, 1963	4:43
12.	"A Hard Rain's A-Gonna Fall" (live)			8:22
13.	"When the Ship Comes In" (live)		Above two recorded at Carnegie Hall in New York City on October 26, 1963	3:37
14.	"Mr. Tambourine Man"		Outtake from the Another Side of Bob Dylan sessions on June 9, 1964, performed with Ramblin' Jack Elliott	6:43
15.	"Chimes of Freedom" (live)		Recorded at the Newport Folk Festival on July 26, 1964	8:04
16.	"It's All Over Now, Baby Blue" (Recorded at the Bringing It All Back Home sessions on January 13, 1965)			3:34
Total length:				72:12

Disc two
No.	Title	Note	Length
1.	"She Belongs to Me" (take 2)	Recorded at the Bringing It All Back Home sessions on January 13, 1965	4:10
2.	"Maggie's Farm" (live)	Recorded at the Newport Folk Festival on July 25, 1965	5:03
3.	"It Takes a Lot to Laugh, It Takes a Train to Cry" (take 9)	Recorded at the Highway 61 Revisited sessions on June 15, 1965	3:35
4.	"Tombstone Blues" (take 9)	Recorded at the Highway 61 Revisited sessions on July 29, 1965	3:37
5.	"Just Like Tom Thumb's Blues" (alternate take)	Recorded at the Highway 61 Revisited sessions on August 2, 1965	5:44
6.	"Desolation Row" (take 1)	Recorded at the Highway 61 Revisited sessions on July 29, 1965	11:45
7.	"Highway 61 Revisited" (take 6)	Recorded at the Highway 61 Revisited sessions on August 2, 1965	3:40
8.	"Leopard-Skin Pill-Box Hat" (take 1)	Recorded at the Blonde on Blonde sessions on January 25, 1966	6:26
9.	"Stuck Inside of Mobile with the Memphis Blues Again" (take 5)	Recorded at the Blonde on Blonde sessions on February 17, 1966	5:45
10.	"Visions of Johanna" (take 8)	Recorded with the Hawks in New York City on November 30, 1965	6:38
11.	"Ballad of a Thin Man" (live)	Recorded at the ABC Theatre in Edinburgh on May 20, 1966	7:46
12.	"Like a Rolling Stone" (live)	Recorded at the Free Trade Hall in Manchester on May 17, 1966; previously released on The Bootleg Series Vol. 4: Bob Dylan Live 1966, The "Royal Albert Hall" Concert	8:12
Total length:			72:21

Three outtakes were released as an internet single for download entitled Exclusive Outtakes from No Direction Home.

Outtakes
No.	Title	Writer(s)	Note	Length
1.	"Baby, Please Don't Go"	Traditional	Outtake from The Freewheelin' Bob Dylan, recorded on April 25, 1962	1:56
2.	"Mr. Tambourine Man" (Live)		Recorded at the Newport Folk Festival in 1964	7:21
3.	"Outlaw Blues" (Take 1)		Recorded at the Bringing It All Back Home sessions on January 13, 1965	2:15
Total length:				11:32

== Charts ==
Chart performance for The Bootleg Series Vol. 7: No Direction Home: The Soundtrack
Chart (2005)	Peak position
Australian Albums (ARIA)	50
Austrian Albums (Ö3 Austria)	66
Belgian Albums (Ultratop Flanders)	31
Belgian Albums (Ultratop Wallonia)	78
Danish Albums (Hitlisten)	26
Dutch Albums (Album Top 100)	31
French Albums (SNEP)	111
German Albums (Offizielle Top 100)	56
Italian Albums (FIMI)	19
New Zealand Albums (RMNZ)	37
Norwegian Albums (VG-lista)	11
Spanish Albums (Promusicae)	31
Swedish Albums (Sverigetopplistan)	8
Swiss Albums (Schweizer Hitparade)	54
UK Albums (Official Charts)	21
US Billboard 200	16
