= The Death of Emmett Till =

Song by Bob Dylan

from the album The Bootleg Series Vol. 9 – The Witmark Demos: 1962–1964
- Released: October 19, 2010
- Genre: Folk
- Length: 4:30
- Label: Columbia
- Songwriter: Bob Dylan

"The Death of Emmett Till", also known as "The Ballad of Emmett Till", is a song by the American musician Bob Dylan about the murder of Emmett Till. Till, a 14-year-old African American, was tortured and killed on August 28, 1955, by two white men, after being accused of disrespecting a white woman. In the song's lyrics, Dylan recounts the murder and trial.

== Background ==
While the song never appeared on any of Dylan's studio albums, it did appear on a number of bootlegs. One bootlegged performance, which was recorded from Cynthia Gooding's radio show called Folksinger's Choice sometime in early 1962, starts with Dylan saying that the melody is based on chords he heard from folk musician Len Chandler. The melody is quite similar to "The House of the Rising Sun" from the album Bob Dylan. Dylan's performance of the song was released on the 1972 album Broadside Ballads, Vol. 6: Broadside Reunion, under the artist name Blind Boy Grunt. Another recording, taped as a demo for music publisher M. Witmark & Sons and also bootlegged for many years, was released on The Bootleg Series Vol. 9 – The Witmark Demos: 1962–1964 in October 2010.

== Reception ==
Stephen J. Whitfield calls the lyrics "mawkish" but describes "the ballad" as "a precocious attempt to continue the tradition of the folk protest song."

== See also ==
- Civil rights movement in popular culture
