= Let Me Die in My Footsteps =

Song by Bob Dylan

from the album The Bootleg Series Volumes 1–3 (Rare & Unreleased) 1961–1991
- Released: March 26, 1991
- Recorded: April 25, 1962
- Length: 3:33
- Label: Columbia
- Songwriter: Bob Dylan
- Producer: Jeff Rosen

"Let Me Die in My Footsteps" is a song written by American singer-songwriter Bob Dylan in February 1962. The song was selected for the original sequence of Dylan's 1963 album The Freewheelin' Bob Dylan, but was replaced by "A Hard Rain's a-Gonna Fall". This version was recorded at Columbia studios on April 25, 1962, during the first Freewheelin' session, and was subsequently released in March 1991 on The Bootleg Series Volumes 1–3 (Rare & Unreleased) 1961–1991.

A later version, recorded as a demo for M. Witmark & Sons publishing company in December 1962, was released in October 2010 on The Bootleg Series Vol. 9: The Witmark Demos: 1962–1964. The song's first release, however, was in September 1963 on The Broadside Ballads, Vol. 1, an album of topical songs compiled by folk musician Pete Seeger and Sis Cunningham, publisher of Broadside magazine. This version was recorded on January 24, 1963, with Dylan performing as "Blind Boy Grunt" (for contractual reasons), backed by his friend Happy Traum. Broadside had published the song's lyrics under its original title, "I Will Not Go Down Under the Ground", in the magazine's third issue in April 1962.

== Background ==
In the booklet that accompanied The Bootleg Series Volumes 1–3, Todd Harvey wrote that "Let Me Die in My Footsteps" has no clear melodic precedent and suggests that this may be the first song for which Dylan created an original melody. However, Dylan later revealed the song's origins in Chronicles: Volume One, indicating it was based on an old Roy Acuff ballad. According to Dylan, the song was inspired by the construction of fallout shelters, a widespread practice in the U.S. during the Cold War political climate of the 1950s when he was growing up.

In 1963, Dylan gave this account of how he came to write "Let Me Die in My Footsteps" to critic Nat Hentoff, who wrote the liner notes for The Freewheelin' Bob Dylan:

I was going through some town and they were making this bomb shelter right outside of town, one of these sort of Coliseum-type things and there were construction workers and everything. I was there for about an hour, just looking at them build, and I just wrote the song in my head back then, but I carried it with me for two years until I finally wrote it down. As I watched them building, it struck me sort of funny that they would concentrate so much on digging a hole underground when there were so many other things they should do in life. If nothing else, they could look at the sky, and walk around and live a little bit, instead of doing this immoral thing.

The liner notes to Broadside Ballads, Vol. 1 included this comment on the song:

[This is] Bob Dylan's blunt answer to the yawping of Madison Avenue Pitchmen trying to sell fallout shelters. He shines a light into the murky darkness of our age and shows us in one bright instant what it might have taken a less impatient philosopher a lifetime to discover: namely that instead of learning to live, we are learning to die. What he says was never more evident than in the recent crisis over Cuba, when millions of Americans sought desperately to think of some dignified way to meet death in an obscene atomic holocaust.
