= Bob Dylan World Tour 1966 =

1966 concert tour by Bob Dylan

- Tour by Bob Dylan and the Band
- A ticket stub for the April 29, 1966 show at the Konserthuset, Stockholm, Sweden. This show began the European leg of the 1966 World Tour.
- Location: North America; Australia; Europe
- Start date: February 4, 1966
- End date: May 27, 1966
- Legs: 3
- No. of shows: 45

Bob Dylan and the Band concert chronology
- North America Tour (1965); World Tour (1966); Bob Dylan and the Band Tour (1974)

The Bob Dylan World Tour 1966 was a concert tour undertaken by the American musician Bob Dylan, from February to May 1966. Dylan's 1966 World Tour was notable as the first tour where Dylan employed an electric band backing him, following him "going electric" at the 1965 Newport Folk Festival. The musicians Dylan employed as his backing band were known as the Hawks, who later became famous as the Band.

Photographer Barry Feinstein (who had shot the cover of Dylan's album The Times They Are a-Changin’ in 1964) accompanied Dylan on the UK leg of the tour at the musician's behest to document the tour, both onstage and off.

The 1966 tour was also filmed by director D. A. Pennebaker, and the film was edited by Dylan and Howard Alk to produce a little-seen film, Eat the Document, an anarchic account of the tour. Drummer Mickey Jones also filmed the tour with an 8mm home movie camera.

Many of the 1966 tour concerts were audio recorded by Columbia Records. These recordings produced two official albums: The Bootleg Series Vol. 4: Bob Dylan Live 1966, The "Royal Albert Hall" Concert, which was actually recorded at the Manchester Free Trade Hall and in 2016, The Real Royal Albert Hall Concert, as well as The 1966 Live Recordings, a 36 CD box set of every recorded concert from the 1966 tour. There are also many unofficial bootleg recordings of the tour.

The last show of the tour was on May 27, 1966 at the Royal Albert Hall, and after withdrawing from the public eye and relocating to Woodstock because of a motorcycle accident he suffered on July 29 of the same year, it would be his last show on a major tour until 1974.

== Tour ==
=== Finding the Band ===
As Dylan finished the sessions for his 1965 "Positively 4th Street" single, he wanted to reproduce on-stage the same sound that he had polished in the studio. He soon began to gather a backing band with several musicians, such as bassist Harvey Brooks and organist Al Kooper, whom he had played with during the sessions for Highway 61 Revisited. However, the bulk of the players came from Ronnie Hawkins' former backing group, Levon and the Hawks. They impressed Dylan when he saw them play in Toronto, at the direction of Albert Grossman's staffer, Mary Martin, who told him to visit the group at Le Coq d'Or Tavern, a Yonge Street club. (Robbie Robertson recalled that it was the Friar's Tavern, a nearby establishment.) An alternate version of the first meeting, put forward by Williamson, suggests that he saw them in a Jersey Shore club. Drummer Levon Helm and guitarist Robbie Robertson were quickly invited to join Dylan's backing group. After only two shows into the initial tour in North America, Kooper left the band due to stress and safety concerns, and he and Brooks were promptly replaced by the remaining Hawks (bassist Rick Danko, pianist Richard Manuel and organist Garth Hudson). Drummer Levon Helm, too, disillusioned by the constantly hostile reception from audiences, departed in November and was replaced by session drummer Bobby Gregg. Gregg eventually left the band as the tour progressed, and Sandy Konikoff replaced him on drums, who left the tour when Dylan traveled to Australia. Former Johnny Rivers drummer Mickey Jones remained with the band throughout the rest of the tour.

=== Background ===
Dylan and his backing group gave concerts sporadically throughout the United States and Canada while the initial sessions for Blonde on Blonde were being recorded. Sometime in September 1965, Dylan and the Band embarked to Woodstock, New York to rehearse the songs they would be performing on the tour. Several songs, such as "Maggie's Farm", "Can You Please Crawl Out Your Window?" and "It Ain't Me Babe" were dropped from the tour's set list as they embarked to different locations.

The first leg of the tour took place in North America, but by now both Kooper and Helm had left the band. The initial sessions with the Band for Blonde on Blonde, proved unproductive, with only two tracks good enough to be released ("Can You Please Crawl Out Your Window?" and "One of Us Must Know (Sooner or Later)"). Dylan soon began recording in Nashville, Tennessee with a new lineup of studio musicians. By April, Dylan had finished the sessions for Blonde on Blonde, and continued the tour outside of North America.

Leaving the continental United States, Dylan first traveled to Honolulu, Hawaii and from there to Australia, where he performed seven concerts over ten days in Sydney, Brisbane, Melbourne, Adelaide and Perth. The tour group then flew to Scandinavia for concerts in Stockholm and Copenhagen. After Scandinavia, Dylan toured Ireland [appearing in Dublin] and the United Kingdom (including Northern Ireland) in May. He made a short trip to Paris before he finished the tour in London.

=== The "Royal Albert Hall" Concert ===
Towards the end of the May 17, 1966 concert at the Free Trade Hall in Manchester, Dylan was called "Judas!" by a member of the audience (possibly John Cordwell), between the songs "Ballad of a Thin Man" and "Like a Rolling Stone". Dylan answered back, yelling to the man that "I don't believe you ... you're a liar!", before he shouted to the members of the band to "Play it fuckin' loud!", where they then finished off the set with "Like a Rolling Stone". A bootleg album of the electric portion of this concert existed for many years, first appearing on the record In 1966 There Was in 1970, before it was officially released as The Bootleg Series Vol. 4: Bob Dylan Live 1966, The "Royal Albert Hall" Concert in 1998. This incident soon became a legendary moment in Rock history; its status even drove BBC Radio 1 DJ Andy Kershaw to declare "I still can't believe they've finally put it out. I just keep staring at my copy."

== Reception ==
Because Dylan was now playing "electric", he faced constant heckling by folkniks and angry fans during the second -- electric -- half of his concerts. Even the press began to go along with the dissent of his fans. A review in the magazine Melody Maker of the May 5, 1966 concert in Dublin, Ireland stated that "It was unbelievable to see a hip-swinging [sic] Dylan trying to look and sound like Mick Jagger. For most it was the night of the big let-down." In Europe, walkouts were common, although that was not the case in the United States. The press became more and more hostile as he traveled through England, particularly in London. The May 10 concert at Colston Hall in Bristol was savaged by one reviewer, saying that Dylan was "sacrificing lyric and melody to the God of big beat.", while another stated that Dylan had been "buried in a grave of deafening drums." Robert Shelton later wrote in Dylan's biography that the press was behaving like a "conformist, Neanderthal mob".

Concert-goers began to become hostile, yelling at Dylan from their seats, shouting phrases like "phoney" and "traitor" between songs. Dylan would often reply to these jeers, such as in Liverpool, where one man shouted "Where's the poet in you? What's happened to your conscience?", to which Dylan responded, "There's a fellow up there looking for the savior, huh? The savior's backstage, we have a picture of him." During one concert, as the jeers and shouts reached a terrible level, Dylan lazily replied, "Oh come on, these are all protest songs. It's the same stuff as always, can't you hear?" When the group embarked to Scotland, the audience turned out to be somewhat more receptive, at least in Glasgow, where Dylan's supporters outnumbered his hecklers. But in Edinburgh, a section of the audience attempted to drown out the band by playing their own harmonicas. In Paris, the French even jeered during Dylan's acoustic set; and during the electric portion, Dylan told his audience, "Don't worry, I'm just as eager to finish and leave as you are." The final two nights at the Royal Albert Hall in London saw the biggest walkouts of the tour, but there was some support, as the Beatles were in the audience, shouting down the hecklers. George Harrison denounced the angry fans as "idiots". When the tour ended, the Band returned to America angry and dejected; Robbie Robertson later said that, "After those shows we were lonely guys. Nobody wanted to hang out with us." In his memoir, Robertson writes of the Beatles stopping by Dylan's hotel room after the final London show, but Dylan being too exhausted to receive them.

In November 2023, the American singer/songwriter Cat Power released Cat Power Sings Dylan: The 1966 Royal Albert Hall Concert, a cover album of Dylan's concert on May 17th 1966 in Manchester. The album was recorded live on November 5th 2022 at the Royal Albert Hall in London.

== Personality and equipment ==
Now that Dylan had separated himself from his folk contemporaries, his personality had greatly changed. The James Dean look of a leather jacket and slacks was gone. Dylan's new style of dress consisted of a dark green hounds tooth suit consisting of a tight, double-breasted waist-coat with a matching pair drainpipe trousers, all laced with diamond flecked stripes. For footwear, he chose a new pair of handmade Chelsea Boots, which were famously associated with the Beatles, and better known as "Beatle boots". According to his primary photographer Barry Feinstein, Dylan picked up the custom tailored suit and boots from a shop on Carnaby Street in London; However, guitarist Robbie Robertson claims the houndstooth suit was made by Toronto-based tailor Lou Myles. When he wasn't on stage performing, Dylan was rarely seen without his blue suede military jacket, and custom wayfarer-style sunglasses.

Throughout the tour Dylan used during his acoustic sets his Gibson Nick Lucas Special. Upon his arrival in Melbourne, After Dylan's Nick Lucas Special was damaged and sent for repairs, he would borrow a guitar from a local luthier for his shows in Adelaide and Perth until he got back the repaired guitar just in time for the European leg of the tour. He also used the short lived Fender Kingman in his free time off stage. During the electric sets, he used a 1965 black Fender Telecaster with a maplecap neck, subsequently used by Robbie Robertson until the mid seventies, during concerts like Woodstock and the Isle of Wight Festival, before being stripped of its paint in 1970, and having a humbucker placed on it around 1971. Robertson owned this guitar up until at least 2015. Robertson used an early sixties blonde Telecaster with rosewood fretboard and a Fender Showman. Rick Danko employed a mid-sixties sunburst Fender Jazz Bass and a Traynor amplifier. Garth Hudson played his Lowrey Lincolnwood SSO and a Leslie 45. Richard Manuel used the piano of the venue, and Mickey Jones played a Gretsch drumkit.

Despite the transition from acoustic folk music over to rock 'n' roll, Dylan did not see himself as a part of the mainstream crowd of musicians. In a press conference in December 1965 he would detach himself from his contemporaries of rock music and call his style "vision music ... mathematical music".

During his 1966 World Tour Tour, Dylan is alleged to have taken drugs. During his 1965 tour of England, it was alleged Dylan had used cannabis, but, by the end of 1965, he is said to have taken other drugs. During his 1966 tour, Dylan told Robert Shelton: "It takes a lot of medicine to keep up this pace. A concert tour like this has almost killed me." Dylan told Rolling Stone in 1984 that he "never got hooked on any kind of drug.".

== Tour dates ==
Date	City	Country	Venue	Ref.
North America
February 4, 1966	Louisville	United States	Louisville Convention Center	
February 5, 1966	White Plains	United States	Westchester County Center	
February 6, 1966	Pittsburgh	United States	Syria Mosque	
February 10, 1966	Memphis	United States	Ellis Auditorium	
February 11, 1966	Richmond	United States	Shrine Mosque	
February 12, 1966	Norfolk	United States	Norfolk Municipal Auditorium	
February 19, 1966	Ottawa	Canada	Ottawa Auditorium	
February 20, 1966	Montreal	Canada	Place des Arts	
February 24, 1966	Philadelphia	United States	Academy of Music	
February 25, 1966	Philadelphia	United States	Academy of Music	
February 26, 1966	West Hempstead	United States	Island Garden	
March 3, 1966	Miami Beach	United States	Convention Hall	
March 5, 1966	Jacksonville	United States	Jacksonville Coliseum	
March 11, 1966	St. Louis	United States	Kiel Opera House	
March 12, 1966	Lincoln	United States	Pershing Municipal Auditorium	
March 13, 1966	Denver	United States	Civic Auditorium	
March 19, 1966	Los Angeles	United States	Hollywood Bowl	
March 24, 1966	Portland	United States	Paramount Theatre	
March 25, 1966	Seattle	United States	Center Arena	
March 26, 1966	Vancouver	Canada	PNE Agrodome	
April 9, 1966	Honolulu	United States	International Center	
Oceania
April 13, 1966	Sydney	Australia	Sydney Stadium	
April 15, 1966	Brisbane	Australia	Brisbane Festival Hall	
April 16, 1966^{[A]}	Sydney	Australia	Sydney Stadium	
April 19, 1966	Melbourne	Australia	Festival Hall	
April 20, 1966	Melbourne	Australia	Festival Hall	
April 22, 1966	Adelaide	Australia	Palais Theatre	
April 23, 1966	Perth	Australia	Capitol Theatre	
Europe
April 29, 1966	Stockholm	Sweden	Stockholm Concert Hall	
May 1, 1966	Copenhagen	Denmark	K.B. Hallen	
May 5, 1966	Dublin	Ireland	Adelphi Cinema	
May 6, 1966	Belfast	Northern Ireland	ABC Theatre	
May 10, 1966	Bristol	England	Colston Hall	
May 11, 1966	Cardiff	Wales	Capitol Theatre	
May 12, 1966	Birmingham	England	Birmingham Odeon	
May 14, 1966	Liverpool	England	Odeon Theatre	
May 15, 1966	Leicester	England	De Montfort Hall	
May 16, 1966	Sheffield	England	Gaumont Theatre	
May 17, 1966	Manchester	England	Free Trade Hall	
May 19, 1966	Glasgow	Scotland	Odeon Theatre	
May 20, 1966	Edinburgh	Scotland	ABC Theatre	
May 21, 1966	Newcastle	England	Odeon Theatre	
May 24, 1966	Paris	France	L'Olympia	
May 26, 1966	London	England	Royal Albert Hall	
May 27, 1966	London	England	Royal Albert Hall	

== Set lists ==
Beginning all of his concerts with an acoustic set, Dylan performed seven songs each time. As well as playing material that was recorded as folk songs, he played several of his recently recorded electric songs acoustically ("She Belongs to Me", "Visions of Johanna", etc.). During the second half of a concert, he performed eight songs each time; but on the other hand, played some of his older, once acoustic material as electric blues ("One Too Many Mornings", "I Don't Believe You"); but the bulk of each set was centered on recent Blonde on Blonde and Highway 61 Revisited material, whether it be acoustic or electric. The song "Tell Me, Momma", which opened the second half of the concert, was never recorded for a studio album.

During the initial U.S. Tour (August 1965 – March 1966), Dylan rarely played the same set list twice in a row. The set list below is that of the 28 August concert at Forest Hills Tennis Stadium, New York City.

Acoustic Half

1. "She Belongs to Me"
2. "To Ramona"
3. "Gates of Eden"
4. "Love Minus Zero/No Limit"
5. "Desolation Row"
6. "It's All Over Now, Baby Blue"
7. "Mr. Tambourine Man"

Electric Half

1. "Tombstone Blues"
2. "I Don't Believe You (She Acts Like We Never Have Met)"
3. "From a Buick 6"
4. "Just Like Tom Thumb's Blues"
5. "Maggie's Farm"
6. "It Ain't Me Babe"
7. "Ballad of a Thin Man"
8. "Like a Rolling Stone"

Dylan added several songs to the set as the tour progressed, including "Baby, Let Me Follow You Down", "Visions of Johanna", "4th Time Around", and "Tell Me, Momma", while he omitted "To Ramona", "Gates of Eden", "Love Minus Zero/No Limit", "Tombstone Blues", "From a Buick 6", "Maggie's Farm", "It Ain't Me, Babe", and "Positively 4th Street" during the later part of the tour. He also performed several songs only once, including "Can You Please Crawl Out Your Window?" and "Long Distance Operator". After these revisions, the set each night became consistent, following the pattern below.

Acoustic Half

1. "She Belongs to Me"
2. "4th Time Around"
3. "Visions of Johanna"
4. "It's All Over Now, Baby Blue"
5. "Desolation Row"
6. "Just Like a Woman"
7. "Mr. Tambourine Man"

Electric Half

1. "Tell Me, Momma"
2. "I Don't Believe You (She Acts Like We Never Have Met)"
3. "Baby, Let Me Follow You Down"
4. "Just Like Tom Thumb's Blues"
5. "Leopard-Skin Pill-Box Hat"
6. "One Too Many Mornings"
7. "Ballad of a Thin Man"
8. "Like a Rolling Stone"

Each show lasted approximately 90 minutes, not including the break between the acoustic and electric halves. The only background vocals used were Danko's wailing "behind" during "One Too Many Mornings".

== Musicians ==
- Bob Dylan – acoustic and electric guitars; harmonica, piano, lead vocals
- Robbie Robertson – electric guitar
- Rick Danko – bass guitar; backing vocals
- Garth Hudson – organ
- Richard Manuel – piano
- Mickey Jones – drums
- Sandy Konikoff – drums (before March 26, 1966)

Musicians per Olof Bjorner.

== Aftermath ==
On July 29, 1966, two months after the last concert of the World Tour, Dylan was involved in a motorcycle accident while riding on the property of his manager, Albert Grossman. The true nature and extent of his injuries has never been publicly disclosed. Although Dylan still had bookings for the rest of 1966 and beyond, he cancelled all engagements for an indefinite period after the accident.

There were many reasons that contributed to his decision. He had come under increasing pressure over the preceding few years—his transition to "electric" music had provoked intense criticism from his former colleagues who were still involved in the folk music scene. His concerts and press conferences became increasingly hostile and confrontational, and it has been said that he was using drugs by the end of the tour.

Another significant personal factor is that Dylan was newly married, and with a young family. He had quietly wed Sara Lownds on November 22, 1965, and their first child Jesse was born two months later (Dylan also adopted Lownds' child from a previous relationship, and they had three more children over the next three years).

Dylan's withdrawal from touring coincided with a similar decision by the Beatles, who had decided to halt public performances after their unpleasant experiences in The Philippines (after unintentionally snubbing the Marcos family) and in the United States (due to the backlash over John Lennon's misinterpreted "more popular than Jesus" statement). This was soon followed by the touring hiatus imposed on the Rolling Stones caused by the drug busts and subsequent trials of Mick Jagger, Keith Richards and Brian Jones, which prevented them from touring in the U.S. for some time.

Another important factor is that the high public profiles of these artists were increasingly making them targets for violence. The surviving members of the Beatles have recorded in The Beatles' Anthology that they received death threats, and were in fear for their lives during their final U.S. tour in 1966.

However, Dylan continued to record in the period following the accident, taping a large body of work with The Band downstairs in the converted garage of their rented home, nicknamed "Big Pink" due to its salmon-colored siding, near Woodstock, New York, which became known as The Basement Tapes. Dylan returned to the studio to record 1967's John Wesley Harding, and 1969's Nashville Skyline. In 1969 he began making occasional one-off appearances, usually at festivals or large charity concerts, including his highly anticipated performance at the 1969 Isle of Wight Festival, and George Harrison's 1971 Concert For Bangladesh. However, Dylan did not undertake another full-scale concert tour until the "Before The Flood" tour that reunited him with The Band in January 1974.
