= The Bootleg Series Vol. 4: Bob Dylan Live 1966, The "Royal Albert Hall" Concert =

The Bootleg Series, Vol. 4: Bob Dylan Live 1966, The "Royal Albert Hall" Concert

Live album by Bob Dylan
- Released: October 13, 1998
- Recorded: May 17, 1966
- Venues: Free Trade Hall, Manchester
- Genres: Rock; folk; folk rock; blues rock
- Length: 95:18
- Label: Columbia
- Producer: Jeff Rosen

Bob Dylan chronology
Time Out of Mind (1997)	The Bootleg Series, Vol. 4: Bob Dylan Live 1966, The "Royal Albert Hall" Concert (1998)	The Best of Bob Dylan, Vol. 2 (2000)

Bob Dylan Bootleg Series chronology
Volumes 1–3 (Rare & Unreleased) 1961–1991 (1991)	Vol. 4: Bob Dylan Live 1966, The "Royal Albert Hall" Concert (1998)	Vol. 5: Bob Dylan Live 1975, The Rolling Thunder Revue (2002)

Live 1966: The "Royal Albert Hall" Concert is a two-disc live album by Bob Dylan, released in 1998. It is the second installment in the ongoing Bob Dylan Bootleg Series on Legacy Recordings, and has been certified a gold record by the RIAA. It was recorded at the Manchester Free Trade Hall during Dylan's 1966 world tour, though early bootlegs attributed the recording to the Royal Albert Hall so it became known as the Royal Albert Hall Concert. Extensively bootlegged for decades, it is an important document in the development of popular music during the 1960s.

The set list consisted of two parts, with the first half of the concert being Dylan alone on stage performing an entirely acoustic set of songs, while the second half of the concert has Dylan playing an "electric" set of songs alongside his band the Hawks. The first half of the concert was greeted warmly by the audience, while the second half was highly criticized, with heckling going on before and after each song from those who objected to Dylan's use of a full rock and roll band.

== History ==
After touring North America from the fall of 1965 through the winter of 1966, Dylan, accompanied by the Hawks (later renamed the Band), embarked on a six-week spring tour that began in Australia, wound through western Europe, Ireland and the United Kingdom, and wrapped up in London. Dylan's move to electric music, and his apparent disconnection from traditional folk music, continued to be controversial, and his UK audiences were particularly disruptive with some fans believing Dylan had "sold out".

The electric part of this concert first surfaced in late 1970 or early 1971 on bootleg LPs with various titles. On June 3, 1971, critic Dave Marsh reviewed one bootleg in Creem magazine, writing "It is the most supremely elegant piece of rock 'n' roll music I've ever heard...The extreme subtlety of the music is so closely interwoven with its majesty that they appear as one and the same."

The same month, critic Jon Landau reviewed another edition of the concert:

Needless to say, the album is both musically great and an amazing path back into the temperament of the sixties. Listening to it, it isn't hard to remember Dylan on stage of the Donnelly Memorial Theatre in Boston or at Forest Hills in New York City standing toe to toe, eyeball to eyeball with Robbie Robertson between every verse of practically every song, while the guitarist played his fills. Nor is it hard to remember that long, lean, frail look that sometimes made you wonder what gave him the strength to stand up there in the first place, as he remembered the unbelievably complex lyrics to his unbelievably long songs, without ever faltering...It isn't hard for me to remember the booing, the names, the insults he endured just to be standing there with an electric band...On this album the audience claps at the wrong time, claps rhythmically as if to deliberately throw his timing off. At the beginning of 'One Too Many Mornings' he tells a completely psychotic story in a very low voice while the audience makes its noise. As they gradually lose their energy, he finds his and his voice gets louder, until, when they are almost completely silent he says plainly, 'if you only wouldn't clap so hard.' The audience applauds the statement.

The early bootleg LPs attributed the recording to one of Dylan's tour-closing concerts at London's Royal Albert Hall that was also recorded, as was a show in Liverpool (May 14), supervised by Dylan producer Bob Johnston. However, Dylan's now-legendary confrontation with a heckler calling out "Judas" from the audience, clearly heard on the recording, was well documented as having occurred at Manchester's Free Trade Hall on May 17, 1966. After "Judas!", there is clapping, followed by more heckles. Dylan then says "I don't believe you", then after a pause, "You're a liar." Bob Dylan then said to his band, "play it fuckin' loud" as they begin "Like a Rolling Stone." At the end, the audience erupts into applause and Dylan says, "Thank you."

After years of conflicting reports and speculation among Dylan discographers, the Manchester source was verified after the preliminary mix of a proposed Columbia edition was bootlegged in 1995 as Guitars Kissing & The Contemporary Fix. Dylan rejected that edition; three years later, he authorized a markedly different version for his second "Bootleg Series" release, though it is the fourth volume. One song recorded at Dylan's real Royal Albert Hall concert had been previously released: his May 26, 1966, performance of "Visions of Johanna" on the Box set Biograph. Excerpts from other 1966 UK performances are included in Martin Scorsese's 2005 television documentary No Direction Home. Film footage of the "Judas" incident was discovered and used at the end of the documentary.

The inside leaflet reveals useful information about the conditions of how the concert was recorded and transferred to disc and it confirms that the version of "It's All Over Now, Baby Blue", previously released on the Box set Biograph, duly comes from this concert.

On July 29, 1966, two months after finishing his spring tour, Dylan suffered a motorcycle accident. As a result of his long recuperation, Dylan had to cancel the remaining shows he had scheduled for 1966. However, he would continue to collaborate with the Hawks, and over the next year or so, they would produce some of their most celebrated recordings, many of which were eventually released on The Basement Tapes. Dylan would not embark on another tour until 1974.

== Reception and legacy ==
Professional ratings
Review scores
Source	Rating
AllMusic	5/5 stars
Robert Christgau	B+
The Encyclopedia of Popular Music	5/5 stars
Rolling Stone	4.5/5 stars
Pitchfork	10/10
Uncut	10/10

Finally released in 1998, Live 1966: The "Royal Albert Hall" Concert was a commercial and critical success. It reached #19 in the U.K. and was included in the book 1001 Albums You Must Hear Before You Die.

"For (Led Zeppelin guitarist) Jimmy Page," remarked photographer (and Page's friend) Ross Halfin, "this (the bootleg) is still the ultimate album. Jimmy still buys copies of it whenever he sees it, as he likes it so much."

The album is ranked number 989 in All Time Top 1000 Albums (3rd. edition, 2000). Elvis Costello named it as one of his 500 favorite albums.

In 2023, Cat Power covered the record in full.

== Track listing ==
All tracks are written by Bob Dylan, except "Baby, Let Me Follow You Down" by Eric von Schmidt and arranged by Dylan.

Disc one (solo acoustic)
No.	Title	Length
1.	"She Belongs to Me"	3:27
2.	"4th Time Around"	4:37
3.	"Visions of Johanna"	8:08
4.	"It's All Over Now, Baby Blue"	5:45
5.	"Desolation Row"	11:31
6.	"Just Like a Woman"	5:52
7.	"Mr. Tambourine Man"	8:52
Total length:		48:12

Disc two (with the Hawks)
No.	Title	Length
1.	"Tell Me, Momma"	5:10
2.	"I Don't Believe You (She Acts Like We Never Have Met)"	6:07
3.	"Baby, Let Me Follow You Down"	3:46
4.	"Just Like Tom Thumb's Blues"	6:50
5.	"Leopard-Skin Pill-Box Hat"	4:50
6.	"One Too Many Mornings"	4:22
7.	"Ballad of a Thin Man"	7:55
8.	"Like a Rolling Stone"	8:01
Total length:		47:01

== Personnel ==
- Bob Dylan – vocal, acoustic guitar, electric guitar, harmonica; piano on "Ballad of a Thin Man"
- Robbie Robertson – electric guitar
- Garth Hudson – organ
- Richard Manuel – piano
- Rick Danko – bass guitar, backing vocal
- Mickey Jones – drums

Technical personnel

- Jeff Rosen – producer
- Vic Anesini – engineering
- Steven Berkowitz, Michael Brauer – mixing
- Greg Calbi – mastering
- Geoff Gans – art direction
- Mark Wilder – editing
- Tony Glover – liner notes

Photography

- Barry Feinstein, David Gahr
- Don Hunstein, Art Kane
- Mark Makin, Hank Parker
- Jan Persson, Jerry Schatzberg
- Sandy Speiser

== Charts ==
Chart performance for The Bootleg Series Vol. 4: Bob Dylan Live 1966, The "Royal Albert Hall" Concert
Chart (1998)	Peak position
Australian Albums (ARIA)	29
Belgian Albums (Ultratop Flanders)	27
Canada Top Albums/CDs (RPM)	50
Dutch Albums (Album Top 100)	46
French Albums (SNEP)	56
German Albums (Offizielle Top 100)	98
Norwegian Albums (VG-lista)	10
Swedish Albums (Sverigetopplistan)	19
UK Albums (Official Charts)	19
US Billboard 200	31

== See also ==
- Bob Dylan World Tour 1966
- Eat the Document
