= Bob Dylan filmography =

This is a list of films in which Bob Dylan appears.

== As an actor ==
Full-length dramatic movies (not documentaries) in which Bob Dylan has appeared as an actor.

Film	Release Year	Role	Director	Notes
Madhouse on Castle Street	1963	Bobby	Philip Saville	Lost film
Pat Garrett and Billy the Kid	1973	Alias	Sam Peckinpah	Small role
Renaldo and Clara	1978	Renaldo	Bob Dylan	
Hearts of Fire	1987	Billy Parker	Richard Marquand	
Catchfire	1990	"chainsaw-wielding artist"	Dennis Hopper	Cameo
Masked and Anonymous	2003	Jack Fate	Larry Charles	

== As himself ==
Documentary films in which Bob Dylan appears, sometimes in concert footage and sometimes in other settings, such as interviews.

Film	Release Year	Director	Notes	Ref.
Dont Look Back	1967	D. A. Pennebaker		
Eat the Document	1972	D. A. Pennebaker, with Dylan		
Hard Rain	1976	Jacques Levy	Television film	
Getting to Dylan	1986	Christopher Sykes		
No Direction Home	2005	Martin Scorsese		
Trouble No More	2017	Ron Kantor and Jennifer Lebeau	Includes Michael Shannon in scripted interludes	
Rolling Thunder Revue: A Bob Dylan Story by Martin Scorsese	2019	Martin Scorsese	Includes fictional elements, with Dylan at times giving scripted fictional lines, but always as himself.	
