= Eat the Document =

- Bootleg DVD cover
- Directed by: Bob Dylan
- Starring: Bob Dylan; Robbie Robertson; Bob Neuwirth; Johnny Cash; John Lennon; Rick Danko; Richard Manuel; Garth Hudson
- Music by: Bob Dylan
- Country of origin: United States
- Original language: English

Production
- Producer: Bob Dylan
- Cinematography: D. A. Pennebaker
- Editors: Bob Dylan; Howard Alk; Gordon Quinn; D. A. Pennebaker (additional editing)
- Running time: 52 minutes
- Production company: ABC Television

Original release
- Release: 1972

Eat the Document is a documentary of Bob Dylan's 1966 tour of parts of Europe with the Hawks. It was shot under Dylan's direction by D. A. Pennebaker, whose groundbreaking documentary Dont Look Back chronicled Dylan's 1965 British tour. The film was originally commissioned for the ABC television series ABC Stage 67.

Though shooting had completed for the film, Dylan's July 1966 motorcycle accident delayed the editing process. Once well enough to work again, Dylan edited the film himself. ABC rejected the film as incomprehensible for a mainstream audience.

It has never been released on home video and prints are rarely screened in theaters. Some footage filmed for Eat the Document was used in Martin Scorsese's 2005 documentary on Bob Dylan, No Direction Home, and 3 song excerpts are special features on the DVD.

== Content ==
Venues shown in Eat the Document include Dublin, Belfast, Cardiff, Liverpool, Glasgow, Edinburgh, Newcastle and Paris. Dylan's band during these shows were The Hawks (later to become The Band). Songs from various shows throughout the tour featured in the film include "Tell Me, Momma", "I Don't Believe You (She Acts Like We Never Have Met)", "Ballad of a Thin Man", and "One Too Many Mornings".

Other scenes include Dylan and Robbie Robertson in a Glasgow hotel room writing and working through new songs, most of which remain unreleased and unpublished. Among these songs are "I Can't Leave Her Behind", which was later covered by Stephen Malkmus for the I'm Not There soundtrack. The film also includes a piano duet, backstage in Cardiff, with Johnny Cash performing Cash's "I Still Miss Someone".

== Background and post-production ==
According to Howard Sounes's biography, Down the Highway: The Life of Bob Dylan, after his motorbike accident in July 1966, Dylan viewed a cut of the material edited by Pennebaker and Bob Neuwirth and thought it was too similar to Dont Look Back.

Despite having no filmmaking training, Dylan decided to re-edit the film himself, assisted by longtime associate Howard Alk and with (uncredited) assistant editor Gordon Quinn, co-founder of Kartemquin Films. Pennebaker stated: "It's not something you learn parking cars in a garage. You gotta know some of the rules and he didn't know any of the rules." Dylan and Alk's cut was eventually shown to ABC television, who promptly rejected it as incomprehensible to a mainstream audience.

Commenting on the film when it was screened at the Whitney Museum of American Art, New York, in December 1972, New York Times critic Vincent Canby quotes from the program notes written by Howard Alk, describing the reaction of ABC Television as "What city are we in? What's happening?" According to Canby, Alk explains:

"Instead of trying to re-create the 'real' event with a vérité documentary approach, the editors looked for what each shot itself wanted to be. Conversations unheld, events untranspired. Some real music, some not. Murder, villainy, slavery and lust. We hope a real movie. Perhaps even a comedy."

== Bootleg releases ==
Eat the Document was never given a theatrical release or made commercially available on VHS or DVD, but unauthorized bootleg copies circulate among Dylan collectors. The bootleg DVD cover photo was taken on the train line between Dublin and Belfast, near Balbriggan.

=== John Lennon scene ===
Some bootleg versions of Eat the Document include a longer scene featuring Dylan in a limousine with John Lennon in the early hours of 27 May 1966. As Dylan shows signs of fatigue, and may be impaired by alcohol or drugs, Lennon urges him to get a grip on himself: "Do you suffer from sore eyes, groovy forehead, or curly hair? Take Zimdon!...Come, come, boy, it's only a film. Pull yourself together."

Lennon would later recall in an interview with Rolling Stone that "In the film, I'm just blabbing off and commenting all the time, like you do when you're very high or stoned. I had been up all night. We were being smart alecks, it's terrible. But it was his scene, that was the problem for me. It was his movie. I was on his territory, that's why I was so nervous. I was on his session.."

== Legacy ==
Some of the concert footage shot for Eat the Document – including the "Judas" incident in Manchester's Free Trade Hall – was used in Martin Scorsese's Dylan documentary, No Direction Home, along with footage of Johnny Cash and Dylan singing Hank Williams' "I'm So Lonesome I Could Cry".

Todd Haynes' film 2008 I'm Not There features a reference to the car ride with Lennon, featuring Cate Blanchett as Bob Dylan.
