= Tell Me, Momma =

Song by Bob Dylan

from the album The Bootleg Series Vol. 4: Bob Dylan Live 1966, The "Royal Albert Hall" Concert
- Recorded: May 17, 1966
- Studio: Free Trade Hall
- Genre: Rock
- Length: 5:10
- Label: Columbia
- Songwriter: Bob Dylan
- Producer: Columbia

"Tell Me, Momma" is a song written by Bob Dylan and performed exclusively during his 1966 World Tour with the Band (then known as the Hawks). It was used to introduce the second half of a concert, when Dylan switched from an acoustic solo performance to an electric performance backed by a band. The song was not recorded on a studio album, nor was it ever performed again by Dylan in concert.

Dylan's May 17, 1966 live performance of the song was released in 1998 on The Bootleg Series Vol. 4: Bob Dylan Live 1966, The "Royal Albert Hall" Concert. In 2016, all Dylan's recorded live performances of "Tell Me, Momma" from 1966 were released in the 36-CD boxed set The 1966 Live Recordings, with the May 26, 1966 performance released separately on the album The Real Royal Albert Hall 1966 Concert. The boxed set contains all the live versions of "Tell Me, Momma" ever performed by Dylan and his band.

== History ==
The first known performance of "Tell Me, Momma" was on February 5, 1966, at Westchester County Center, White Plains, New York. The performance was captured on tape by an audience member, but was not officially released until 2016. Dylan continued to perform this song throughout the 1966 tour, but, when he had finished, the song was not recorded on a studio album, nor was it ever performed again by Dylan in concert.

== In popular culture ==
The song was shown played live by Dylan and the Band during his 1966 UK tour; a performance of the song at Paris' L'Olympia on 24 May 1966 featured in D. A. Pennebaker's documentary Eat the Document. The same video appears in Martin Scorsese's 2005 documentary No Direction Home.
