= Clinton Heylin =

English author

- Born: 8 April 1960 (age 66); United Kingdom
- Education: Manchester Grammar School
- Alma mater: University of Sussex
- Occupations: Author, writer
- Writing career
- Language: English
- Genres: Biography, music

Clinton Heylin (born 8 April 1960) is an English author. Heylin has written extensively about popular music, especially on the life and work of Bob Dylan.

== Education ==
Heylin attended Manchester Grammar School. He read history at Bedford College, University of London, followed by an MA in history at the University of Sussex.

== Work ==
Heylin has written extensively on the life and work of Bob Dylan, combining interviews with discographical research. His full-length biography Dylan: Behind the Shades (1991) was republished in a revised second edition as Bob Dylan: Behind the Shades – Take Two (UK edition, 2000) and Bob Dylan: Behind the Shades Revisited (US edition, 2001).

Heylin published a detailed analysis of every song by Dylan in two volumes: Revolution in the Air: The Songs of Bob Dylan: Vol. 1: 1957–73 (2009) and Still on the Road: The Songs of Bob Dylan: Vol. 2: 1974–2008 (2010). These books analyse 610 songs written by Dylan, devoting a numbered section to each song. In 2011, to mark Dylan's 70th birthday, Heylin published Behind the Shades: The 20th Anniversary Edition, which contained 60,000 words of new material to cover Dylan's work since 2000.

He has also written biographies on Van Morrison and Sandy Denny. He received favourable reviews for his studies of Orson Welles, Despite the System: Orson Welles versus the Hollywood Studios, and of Shakespeare's sonnets, So Long As Men Can Breathe.

In 2012, Heylin published a book about the theme of mental illness in British rock music in the 1960s and 1970s. Titled All the Madmen, it includes chapters on the Dialectics of Liberation conference of 1967, Syd Barrett, Pink Floyd's album The Dark Side of the Moon, David Bowie's theme of schizophrenia in his songs, the Who's Quadrophenia album, and Nick Drake.

Also in 2012, Heylin published E Street Shuffle: The Glory Days of Bruce Springsteen and the E Street Band, a biography of Bruce Springsteen and an analysis of his achievements in the recording studio.

In 2015, Heylin published It's One for the Money, a history of song publishing since the birth of the popular music industry and the establishment of song copyrights at the beginning of the twentieth century.

In 2016, Heylin published his history of UK punk music in the year 1976, Anarchy in the Year Zero: The Sex Pistols, the Clash and the Class of '76.

In October 2016, Heylin published his study of Bob Dylan's 1966 World Tour, Judas!: From Forest Hills to the Free Trade Hall: A Historical View of Dylan's Big Boo. Heylin has also contributed the liner notes for the 36-CD set, Bob Dylan: The 1966 Live Recordings, released by Sony/Legacy Recordings, which includes every known recording of Dylan’s 1966 concert tour.

In 2017, Heylin published his account of Dylan's controversial "Born Again" Christian phase, Trouble In Mind: Bob Dylan's Gospel Years: What Really Happened. The book complemented the release of The Bootleg Series Vol. 13: Trouble No More 1979–1981, which consisted of a large number of out-takes and live performances from this period of Dylan's recording and performance career.

In 2018, Heylin published his research into Dylan's recording of the Blood On The Tracks album, No One Else Could Play That Tune. The book complemented the release of The Bootleg Series Vol. 14: More Blood, More Tracks which contained all available studio sessions for Blood On The Tracks.

To tie in with Dylan's 80th birthday in May 2021, Heylin published The Double Life of Bob Dylan: Volume I: 1941–1966 A Restless, Hungry Feeling. The first of two volumes, this biography is based on research by Heylin in the newly-established Bob Dylan archive in Tulsa, Oklahoma. Andrew Motion wrote in The Spectator that "Heylin has always been good on this aspect of Dylan’s story — concealment — hence the title of his first biography, and the way this new one repeats an idea of secrecy."

In 2023, Heylin published The Double Life of Bob Dylan Volume 2: 1966-2021 - Far Away From Myself. This 836 page tome continued his project of revising his prior Dylan biographies by utilizing the resources of the Bob Dylan archive in Tulsa, Oklahoma.

== Books ==
- Saved! The Gospel Speeches of Bob Dylan. Hanuman Books, NY & Madras, 1990. ISBN 978-0-937815-38-0
- Dylan Behind the Shades. Penguin, UK; Simon & Schuster, US, 1991. ISBN 0-14-015413-2
- Bob Dylan: The Recording Sessions 1960–94. Penguin. UK; St Martin’s Press, US, 1995. ISBN 0-312-13439-8
- Dylan Day By Day: A Life in Stolen Moments. Music Sales/Schirmer, 1996. ISBN 978-0-7119-5669-8
- Dylan's Daemon Lover: The Story of a 450-Year Old Pop Ballad. Helter Skelter, 1998. ISBN 978-1-900924-15-3
- Bob Dylan: Behind The Shades – Take Two. Penguin-Viking, UK, 2000. ISBN 0-14-028146-0
- No More Sad Refrains: The Life & Times of Sandy Denny. Helter Skelter, 2001. ISBN 1-900924-11-0
- Bob Dylan: Behind the Shades Revisited. Harper-Collins, US, 2001. ISBN 0-06-052569-X
- Can You Feel the Silence? – Van Morrison: A New Biography. Viking-Penguin, UK; Chicago Review Press, US, 2004. ISBN 978-1-55652-542-1
- Bootleg – The Rise & Fall of the Secret Recording Industry. Omnibus Press, 2004. ISBN 978-1-84449-151-3
- Despite the System: Orson Welles Versus the Hollywood Studios. Canongate, UK; Chicago Press Review, US, 2005. ISBN 1-84195-685-6
- All Yesterdays' Parties: The Velvet Underground in Print 1966–71. Da Capo Press, 2005. ISBN 978-0-306-81477-8
- From the Velvets to the Voidoids: The Birth of American Punk. Helter Skelter, UK; Chicago Review Press, US, 2005. ISBN 978-1-55652-575-9
- The Act You've Known For All These Years: A Year in the Life of Sgt Pepper & Friends. Canongate-Grove, US/UK, 2007. ISBN 978-1-84195-955-9
- Babylon's Burning: From Punk to Grunge. Penguin/ Canongate-Grove, US/UK, 2007. ISBN 978-0-670-91606-1
- So Long As Men Can Breathe: The Untold Story of Shakespeare's Sonnets. Perseus, US, 2009. ISBN 978-0-306-81805-9
- Revolution in the Air: The Songs of Bob Dylan: Vol. 1: 1957–73. Constable-Robinson, UK; Acappella, US, 2009. ISBN 978-1-84901-296-6
- Still on the Road: The Songs of Bob Dylan: Vol. 2: 1974–2008. Constable, UK. 2010. ISBN 978-1-84901-598-1
- E Street Shuffle: The Glory Days of Bruce Springsteen and the E Street Band. Constable. 2012. ISBN 978-1780335797
- All the Madmen: Barrett, Bowie, Drake, the Floyd, the Kinks, the Who and the Journey to the Dark Side of English Rock. Constable. 2012. ISBN 1-84901-880-4
- Behind the Shades: The 20th Anniversary Edition. Faber and Faber. 2011. ISBN 978-0-571-27240-2
- It's One for the Money: The Song Snatchers Who Carved Up a Century of Pop & Sparked a Musical Revolution. Constable. 2015. ISBN 978-1472111906
- Anarchy in the Year Zero: The Sex Pistols, The Clash and the Class of 76. Route Publishing. 2016. ISBN 978-1901927665
- Judas!: From Forest Hills to the Free Trade Hall: A Historical View of Dylan's Big Boo. Route Publishing. 2016. ISBN 978-1901927689
- What We Did Instead Of Holidays: A History Of Fairport Convention And Its Extended Folk-Rock Family. Route Publishing. 2017.
- Trouble in Mind: Bob Dylan's Gospel Years – What Really Happened. Lesser Gods. 2017. ISBN 978-1944713294. Route Publishing ISBN 978-1901927726
- No One Else Could Play That Tune. Route Publishing. 2018. ISBN 9781901927764.
- The Double Life of Bob Dylan: Volume I: 1941–1966 A Restless, Hungry Feeling. Bodley Head. 2021. ISBN 978-1847925886
- The Double Life of Bob Dylan: Volume 2: 1966–2021 Far Away From Myself. Bodley Head. 2023. ISBN 978-1529923797
