= Just Like Tom Thumb's Blues =

Song written and composed by Bob Dylan

- Dutch picture sleeve (live version)

Song by Bob Dylan

from the album Highway 61 Revisited
- Released: August 30, 1965
- Recorded: August 2, 1965
- Studio: Columbia, New York City
- Genre: Folk rock; blues rock
- Length: 5:31
- Label: Columbia
- Songwriter: Bob Dylan
- Producer: Bob Johnston

"Just Like Tom Thumb's Blues" is a song written and performed by Bob Dylan. It was originally recorded on August 2, 1965, and released on the album Highway 61 Revisited. The song was later released on the compilation album Bob Dylan's Greatest Hits Vol. II and as two separate live versions recorded at concerts in 1966: the first of which appeared on the B-side of Dylan's "I Want You" single, with the second being released on The Bootleg Series Vol. 4: Bob Dylan Live 1966, The "Royal Albert Hall" Concert. The song has been covered by many artists, including Gordon Lightfoot, Cat Power, Nina Simone, Barry McGuire, Judy Collins, Frankie Miller, Linda Ronstadt, the Grateful Dead, Neil Young, The Black Crowes, Townes Van Zandt, Bryan Ferry, and The Handsome Family. Lightfoot's version was recorded only weeks after Dylan's original had been released and reached #3 on the Canadian RPM singles chart.

"Just Like Tom Thumb's Blues" has six verses but no chorus. The song's lyrics describe a vision of the narrator's experiences in Juarez, Mexico, where he encounters poverty, sickness, despair, available women, indifferent authorities, alcohol and drugs before finally deciding to return to New York City. The lyrics incorporate literary references to Malcolm Lowry's Under the Volcano, Edgar Allan Poe's "The Murders in the Rue Morgue" and Jack Kerouac's Desolation Angels, while the song's title references Arthur Rimbaud's "My Bohemian Life (Fantasy)". Music journalist Toby Creswell included it on his list of the 1001 greatest songs of all time, and music critic Dave Marsh ranked the live version of "Just Like Tom Thumb's Blues" from Liverpool, released as the B-side of "I Want You", as the #243 greatest single of all time.

== Lyrics and music ==
"Just Like Tom Thumb's Blues" was recorded on August 2, 1965, at Columbia Studios in New York, the same day Dylan recorded "Ballad of a Thin Man", "Highway 61 Revisited" and "Queen Jane Approximately", three other songs that would appear on Highway 61 Revisited. However, "Just Like Tom Thumb's Blues" took more attempts to perfect than the other songs recorded that day; it wasn't until take 16 that Dylan and his band captured on tape the version that was released on the album. The backing musicians on the take that was used on Highway 61 Revisited were Mike Bloomfield on electric guitar, Al Kooper on Hohner Cembalet; a type of electro-mechanical piano, Paul Griffin on piano, Harvey Brooks on bass guitar and Bobby Gregg on drums.

According to Dylan biographer Clinton Heylin, on early takes of the song Sam Lay was the drummer and Frank Owens played piano. In Heylin's opinion, Gregg's jazzier drumming and Griffin's more fluid piano playing better communicated the feeling of dislocation that Dylan desired for the song. Take 5 of the song, which, according to Heylin, featured both Lay and Owens, was included on the 2005 album The Bootleg Series Vol. 7: No Direction Home: The Soundtrack. In 2015, the entire recording session was released on the 18-disc edition of The Bootleg Series Vol. 12: The Cutting Edge 1965–1966, while the 2-disc version of the album featured Take 3 and the 6-disc edition contained Takes 1, 3 and 13.

"Just Like Tom Thumb's Blues"
A sample of the first verse of "Just Like Tom Thumb's Blues", in which the singer finds himself in Juarez, Mexico at Easter time, amidst some "hungry women". The sample also includes a reference to Rue Morgue Avenue from Edgar Allan Poe's short story "The Murders in the Rue Morgue".

Lyrically, "Just Like Tom Thumb's Blues" in a way continues a descriptive road theme from the album's previous song, "Highway 61 Revisited." The singer finds himself at Easter in Juarez, Mexico, amidst sickness, despair, whores and saints. While there, he encounters corrupt authorities, loose women, drugs and alcohol. The song establishes an occasionally nightmarish vision as the singer is influenced by gravity, negativity, sex, drugs, drink, illness, remorse and memory. In the song's final verse, the singer decides he has had enough and announces his intention to leave and head back to New York City. Author Paul Williams has noted that scene and situation in the song are combined into "a gorgeous evocation of muddied consciousness". Despite the sordid details of the singer's experiences in Juarez, the lyrics maintain a wry sense of humor, and William Ruhlmann of the AllMusic website wrote that the song would have been considered a "comic tour de force" if it hadn't tended to be overshadowed by Dylan's other songs of the period.

During a concert in Sydney, New South Wales, Australia in April 1966, Dylan said of the song, "This is, this is called Tom Thumb. This story takes place outside of Mexico City. It begins in Mexico City and it ends really in Des Moines, Iowa, but it's all about this painter, he's a quite older fellow, he comes from Juarez, Juarez is down cross of Texas border, some few feets, and he's a painter. He's very very well-known painter in the area there and we all call him Tom Thumb and when Tom Thumb was going through his blue period, this is one of the most important times of his whole life and he's going to sell many many paintings now taken from his blue period and this is all about Tom Thumb and his early days and so we name this Just Like Tom Thumb's Blues."

Like many of the songs on Highway 61 Revisited, "Just Like Tom Thumb's Blues" has abundant literary references, including images recalling Malcolm Lowry's novel Under the Volcano and a street name taken from Edgar Allan Poe's short story "The Murders in the Rue Morgue". The song also uses the phrase "Housing Project hill" from Jack Kerouac's novel Desolation Angels. A number of Dylan biographers, including Colin Irwin, Robert Shelton and Andy Gill, have suggested that the song's title makes reference to Arthur Rimbaud's poem "My Bohemian Life (Fantasy)", in which Rimbaud refers to himself as "Tom Thumb in a daze." In addition, some commentators have suggested that there may be a musical reference in the lines "And she takes your voice/And leaves you howling at the moon," since "Howlin' at the Moon" is the title of a song by the country singer-songwriter Hank Williams, whom Dylan admired.

Musically, "Just Like Tom Thumb's Blues" consists of no chorus, but six verses, varied by a handful of chords and Dylan's vocal emphasis. Keyboards, drums and vocals provide texture, while Mike Bloomfield plays Latin Americanesque fills on electric guitar. The keyboard parts in particular make innovative use of two different pianos, with Al Kooper playing an electric Hohner Cembalet and Paul Griffin adding a barroom feel on tack piano.

== Other appearances and acclaim ==
In addition to its appearance on the Highway 61 Revisited album, "Just Like Tom Thumb's Blues" was included on the compilation album Bob Dylan's Greatest Hits Vol. II (known as More Bob Dylan Greatest Hits in Europe) and on another compilation released exclusively in Europe titled Bob Dylan's Greatest Hits 2. Alternate takes of the song from the August 2, 1965, recording session have been released on The Bootleg Series Vol. 7: No Direction Home: The Soundtrack and The Bootleg Series Vol. 12: The Cutting Edge 1965–1966.

The song has also been popular live in concert. Clinton Heylin has stated that "as performed live in 1965–66, 'Tom Thumb' became an inferno of pain. As if pain were indeed art." A live version recorded at a concert in Liverpool, England, on May 14, 1966, featuring Dylan backed by the Band, was released as the B-side to the "I Want You" single in 1966, and later also appeared on the Masterpieces compilation. The song was also performed on May 17, 1966, by Dylan and the Band at the famous and controversial so-called 'Albert Hall' concert (which in fact took place at the Manchester Free Trade Hall), and consequently it appears on The Bootleg Series Vol. 4: Bob Dylan Live 1966, The "Royal Albert Hall" Concert. In November 2016, all Dylan's recorded live performances of the song from 1966 were released in the boxed set The 1966 Live Recordings, with the May 26, 1966, performance released separately on the album The Real Royal Albert Hall 1966 Concert. Dylan also played "Just Like Tom Thumb's Blues" regularly during his 1974 tour, and has played it in concert occasionally ever since.

In a 2005 readers' poll published in Mojo magazine, "Just Like Tom Thumb's Blues" was listed as the number 13 all-time greatest Bob Dylan song. In 2002 Uncut magazine listed it as the number 38 all-time best Bob Dylan song. Music journalist Toby Creswell included "Just Like Tom Thumb's Blues" on his list of the 1001 greatest songs of all time, and music critic Dave Marsh ranked the live version from Liverpool as the 243rd-greatest single of all time and as one of the dozen or so truly great B-sides, noting that it demonstrated Dylan's prowess as a great live performer.

The song makes an appearance in the 2012 film The Three Stooges.

== Cover versions ==
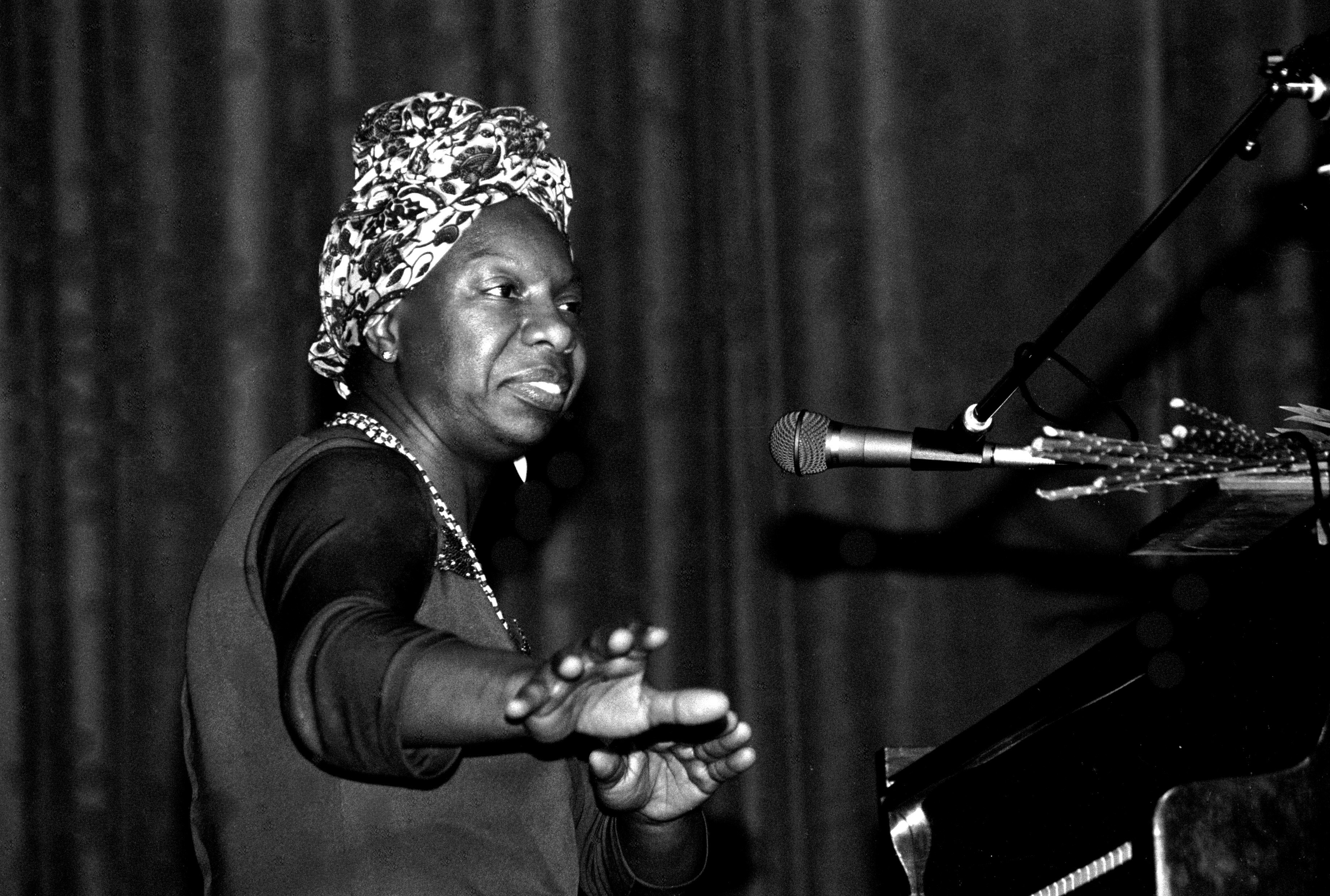
Nina Simone covered "Just Like Tom Thumb's Blues" in 1969.

Canadian singer-songwriter Gordon Lightfoot covered "Just Like Tom Thumb's Blues" in 1965 in a version that reached number 3 on Canada's national RPM singles chart, and number 8 on Toronto's CHUM Chart. Billboard said of this version that "one of best but lesser known Dylan tunes serves as a blockbuster debut on United Artists for the Canadian performer-composer" and praised the vocal performance and the production. Cash Box described it as a "medium-paced chorus-and-orked folk-blueser about the problems women can cause men" and said Lightfoot's rendition was "impressive." Other covers recorded in the 1960s include those by Barry McGuire on his 1966 album This Precious Time and by Judy Collins, on her 1966 album In My Life. Nina Simone also covered it in 1969 on her To Love Somebody album. Jennifer Warnes included it on her 1969 release See Me, Feel Me, Touch Me, Heal Me!

Frankie Miller covered "Just Like Tom Thumb's Blues" in 1973 on Once in a Blue Moon, Linda Ronstadt covered it in 1998 on We Ran and Bryan Ferry covered it on his 2007 album Dylanesque. The Grateful Dead have, on occasion, performed "Just Like Tom Thumb's Blues" live in concert, with bassist Phil Lesh taking a rare turn as lead vocalist, and a recording of the song by the band appears on the album View from the Vault, Volume One. Additionally, Neil Young covered the song for the Bob Dylan tribute concert The 30th Anniversary Concert Celebration in 1992, and the Beastie Boys sampled the last two lines of "Just Like Tom Thumb's Blues" for their song "Finger Lickin' Good", which appeared on their Check Your Head album of the same year.
