= The 1966 Live Recordings =

Compilation album by Bob Dylan

Live album by Bob Dylan
- Released: November 11, 2016
- Recorded: February 5 – May 27, 1966
- Venue: 22 venues / 23 shows (out of a total of 45 1966 shows)
- Genres: Folk; rock
- Length: 1777:01
- Label: Columbia
- Producers: Jeff Rosen; Steve Berkowitz

Bob Dylan chronology
Fallen Angels (2016)	The 1966 Live Recordings (2016)	Triplicate (2017)

The 1966 Live Recordings is a 36-CD boxset of live recordings from the 1966 Live Tour by Bob Dylan, released on Legacy Records in November 2016. It includes every known recording from the tour, including audience tapes. Most of the set was unreleased at that point and some tapes never circulated before.

== Background ==
The 1966 Live Recordings was released as a way to prevent the recordings from legally entering the public domain in Europe, in a similar fashion to The 50th Anniversary Collection (1962), The 50th Anniversary Collection 1963, and The 50th Anniversary Collection 1964. Studio sessions from 1965 and 1966 were released as part of The Bootleg Series Vol. 12 (with the live recordings from 1965 offered as digital download for the purchasers of the Collector's Edition).

== Promotion ==
The set was announced on September 27, 2016, the track "Tell Me, Momma" was uploaded the next day on YouTube for promotion, and the release was supported by a 12-minute documentary. 'The Untold Story Behind The Recordings' finally gave full recognition to the pioneering work of Richard Alderson, who recorded the European concerts; most of the concert filming was, moreover, done by Howard Alk, with only a few concerts partially filmed by D. A. Pennebaker.

== Other releases ==
The concert from Manchester (Discs 19 and 20) was previously released in 1998 as part of The Bootleg Series Vol. 4. A concert from the boxset (London, 26 May 1966 – Discs 28 and 29) was released separately in November 2016 under the title The Real Royal Albert Hall 1966 Concert. Additionally, the 13 April 1966 show in Sydney (discs 1 and 2) was released as an Australia-only limited edition double LP under the title Live in Sydney 1966.

== Reception ==
Professional ratings
Review scores
Source	Rating
AllMusic	4/5 stars
The New York Times	Favorable
Pitchfork	9.3/10
Uncut	4/5 stars

The 1966 Live Recordings currently maintains a 93% positive ("Universal acclaim") rating at Metacritic. Jesse Jarnow from Pitchfork said, "A classic tour from start to finish, the set’s only drawbacks owe more to the format than the music", praising the great performances but insisting on the repetition of the same setlist, though noting that the repetitive setlists could be seen as a "feature, not a bug."

== Track listing ==
All tracks are written by Bob Dylan, except "Baby, Let Me Follow You Down". All tracks in mono except CBS Records recordings (Discs 17, 19, 20, 28, 29, 30 and 31) which are in stereo.

Disc 1 – Sydney, Australia, 13 April 1966 (Soundboard recorded by TCN 9 TV Australia)
No.	Title	Info	Length
1.	"She Belongs to Me"	Incomplete	3:17
2.	"Fourth Time Around"		4:34
3.	"Visions of Johanna"		7:42
4.	"It's All Over Now, Baby Blue"		5:57
5.	"Desolation Row"		10:49
6.	"Just Like a Woman"		5:24
7.	"Mr. Tambourine Man"		7:46
Total length:			45:29

Disc 2 – Sydney, Australia, 13 April 1966 (Soundboard recorded by TCN 9 TV Australia)
No.	Title	Length
1.	"Tell Me, Momma"	4:28
2.	"I Don't Believe You (She Acts Like We Never Have Met)"	5:52
3.	"Baby, Let Me Follow You Down"	4:03
4.	"Just Like Tom Thumb's Blues"	6:51
5.	"Leopard-Skin Pill-Box Hat"	4:37
6.	"One Too Many Mornings"	3:30
7.	"Ballad of a Thin Man"	7:13
8.	"Positively 4th Street"	4:53
Total length:		41:27

Disc 3 – Melbourne, Australia, 20 April 1966 (soundboard tracks 1–6 / unknown broadcast tracks 7–9)
No.	Title	Info	Length
1.	"She Belongs to Me"	Incomplete	2:57
2.	"Fourth Time Around"		5:25
3.	"Visions of Johanna"		9:57
4.	"It's All Over Now, Baby Blue"		6:00
5.	"Desolation Row"		12:10
6.	"Just Like a Woman"		6:00
7.	"Tell Me, Momma"	Fragment	1:38
8.	"Baby, Let Me Follow You Down"		3:18
9.	"Just Like Tom Thumb's Blues"		6:46
Total length:			54:11

Disc 4 – Copenhagen, Denmark, 1 May 1966 (Soundboard)
No.	Title	Info	Length
1.	"She Belongs to Me"		3:45
2.	"Fourth Time Around"	Fragment	1:02
3.	"Baby, Let Me Follow You Down"		3:45
4.	"Just Like Tom Thumb's Blues"		8:30
5.	"Leopard-Skin Pill-Box Hat"	Incomplete	3:32
6.	"Ballad of a Thin Man"		7:54
7.	"Like a Rolling Stone"		7:58
Total length:			36:26

Disc 5 – Dublin, Ireland, 5 May 1966 (Soundboard)
No.	Title	Length
1.	"She Belongs to Me"	3:41
2.	"Fourth Time Around"	4:40
3.	"Visions of Johanna"	7:16
4.	"It's All Over Now, Baby Blue"	5:18
5.	"Desolation Row"	10:34
6.	"Just Like a Woman"	5:28
7.	"Mr. Tambourine Man"	8:16
Total length:		45:13

Disc 6 – Dublin, Ireland, 5 May 1966 (Soundboard)
No.	Title	Length
1.	"Tell Me, Momma"	4:41
2.	"I Don't Believe You (She Acts Like We Never Have Met)"	6:32
3.	"Baby, Let Me Follow You Down"	3:37
4.	"Just Like Tom Thumb's Blues"	6:16
5.	"Leopard-Skin Pill-Box Hat"	3:58
6.	"One Too Many Mornings"	3:42
7.	"Ballad of a Thin Man"	7:22
8.	"Like a Rolling Stone"	8:16
Total length:		44:24

Disc 7 – Belfast, Northern Ireland, 6 May 1966 (Soundboard)
No.	Title	Length
1.	"She Belongs to Me"	3:37
2.	"Fourth Time Around"	4:22
3.	"Visions of Johanna"	7:18
4.	"Desolation Row"	10:17
5.	"Just Like a Woman"	5:14
6.	"Mr. Tambourine Man"	8:18
Total length:		39:06

Disc 8 – Belfast, Northern Ireland, 6 May 1966 (Soundboard)
No.	Title	Info	Length
1.	"Tell Me, Momma"		4:19
2.	"I Don't Believe You (She Acts Like We Never Have Met)"	Previously released on Biograph	5:21
3.	"Baby, Let Me Follow You Down"		3:46
4.	"Just Like Tom Thumb's Blues"		5:56
5.	"Leopard-Skin Pill-Box Hat"		3:39
6.	"One Too Many Mornings"		3:35
7.	"Ballad of a Thin Man"		6:48
8.	"Like a Rolling Stone"		8:03
Total length:			41:27

Disc 9 – Bristol, England, 10 May 1966 (soundboard tracks 1–2 / audience tracks 3–7)
No.	Title	Length
1.	"Fourth Time Around"	4:52
2.	"Mr. Tambourine Man"	9:11
3.	"She Belongs to Me"	3:38
4.	"Visions of Johanna"	7:50
5.	"It's All Over Now, Baby Blue"	5:28
6.	"Desolation Row"	10:08
7.	"Just Like a Woman"	5:34
Total length:		46:41

Disc 10 – Bristol, England, 10 May 1966 (Soundboard)
No.	Title	Info	Length
1.	"Tell Me, Momma"		4:25
2.	"I Don't Believe You (She Acts Like We Never Have Met)"		5:31
3.	"Baby, Let Me Follow You Down"		3:51
4.	"Just Like Tom Thumb's Blues"		5:43
5.	"Leopard-Skin Pill-Box Hat"		3:41
6.	"One Too Many Mornings"	Incomplete	3:17
7.	"Ballad of a Thin Man"		6:56
8.	"Like a Rolling Stone"		8:28
Total length:			41:52

Disc 11 – Cardiff, Wales, 11 May 1966 (Soundboard)
No.	Title	Info	Length
1.	"Tell Me, Momma"		4:29
2.	"I Don't Believe You (She Acts Like We Never Have Met)"		5:57
3.	"Baby, Let Me Follow You Down"		3:50
4.	"Just Like Tom Thumb's Blues"		7:00
5.	"Leopard-Skin Pill-Box Hat"		3:47
6.	"One Too Many Mornings"		3:47
7.	"Ballad of a Thin Man"		7:46
8.	"Like a Rolling Stone"	Audio actually from Newcastle – mixing error	9:46
Total length:			46:22

Disc 12 – Birmingham, England, 12 May 1966 (Soundboard)
No.	Title	Info	Length
1.	"She Belongs to Me"		3:39
2.	"Fourth Time Around"		4:30
3.	"Visions of Johanna"	Incomplete	6:19
4.	"It's All Over Now, Baby Blue"		5:51
5.	"Desolation Row"	Incomplete	10:05
6.	"Just Like a Woman"		6:25
7.	"Mr. Tambourine Man"		8:54
Total length:			45:43

Disc 13 – Birmingham, England, 12 May 1966 (Soundboard)
No.	Title	Length
1.	"Tell Me, Momma"	4:25
2.	"I Don't Believe You (She Acts Like We Never Have Met)"	5:35
3.	"Baby, Let Me Follow You Down"	3:37
4.	"Just Like Tom Thumb's Blues"	5:58
5.	"Leopard-Skin Pill-Box Hat"	3:51
6.	"One Too Many Mornings"	3:31
7.	"Ballad of a Thin Man"	7:21
8.	"Like a Rolling Stone"	8:17
Total length:		42:35

Disc 14 – Liverpool, England, 14 May 1966 (Soundboard)
No.	Title	Info	Length
1.	"It's All Over Now, Baby Blue"		5:34
2.	"Desolation Row"		11:02
3.	"Just Like a Woman"		5:36
4.	"Mr. Tambourine Man"		8:54
5.	"Tell Me, Momma"	Previously released on The Band A Musical History	4:35
6.	"I Don't Believe You (She Acts Like We Never Have Met)"		5:43
7.	"Baby, Let Me Follow You Down"		3:26
8.	"Just Like Tom Thumb's Blues"	Previously released as the B-side of the single "I Want You"	6:51
9.	"Leopard-Skin Pill-Box Hat"		4:07
10.	"One Too Many Mornings"		3:39
11.	"Ballad of a Thin Man"		7:30
12.	"Like a Rolling Stone"		8:42
Total length:			75:39

Disc 15 – Leicester, England, 15 May 1966 (Soundboard)
No.	Title	Length
1.	"She Belongs to Me"	3:30
2.	"Fourth Time Around"	4:42
3.	"Visions of Johanna"	7:49
4.	"It's All Over Now, Baby Blue"	5:33
5.	"Desolation Row"	10:59
6.	"Just Like a Woman"	6:00
7.	"Mr. Tambourine Man"	9:27
Total length:		48:00

Disc 16 – Leicester, England, 15 May 1966 (Soundboard)
No.	Title	Length
1.	"Tell Me, Momma"	4:29
2.	"I Don't Believe You (She Acts Like We Never Have Met)"	5:42
3.	"Baby, Let Me Follow You Down"	3:37
4.	"Just Like Tom Thumb's Blues"	5:46
5.	"Leopard-Skin Pill-Box Hat"	4:32
6.	"One Too Many Mornings"	3:42
7.	"Ballad of a Thin Man"	6:56
8.	"Like a Rolling Stone"	7:18
Total length:		42:02

Disc 17 – Sheffield, England, 16 May 1966 (CBS Records recording)
No.	Title	Length
1.	"She Belongs to Me"	3:52
2.	"Fourth Time Around"	4:37
3.	"Visions of Johanna"	8:40
4.	"It's All Over Now, Baby Blue"	6:00
5.	"Desolation Row"	11:32
6.	"Just Like a Woman"	6:36
7.	"Mr. Tambourine Man"	11:07
Total length:		52:24

Disc 18 – Sheffield, England, 16 May 1966 (Soundboard)
No.	Title	Length
1.	"Tell Me, Momma"	4:42
2.	"I Don't Believe You (She Acts Like We Never Have Met)"	6:02
3.	"Baby, Let Me Follow You Down"	3:32
4.	"Just Like Tom Thumb's Blues"	7:36
5.	"Leopard-Skin Pill-Box Hat"	4:05
6.	"One Too Many Mornings"	4:16
7.	"Ballad of a Thin Man"	7:23
8.	"Like a Rolling Stone"	8:42
Total length:		46:18

Disc 19 – Manchester, England, 17 May 1966 (CBS Records recording)
No.	Title	Info	Length
1.	"She Belongs to Me"	Previously released on The Bootleg Series Vol. 4	3:27
2.	"Fourth Time Around"	Previously released on The Bootleg Series Vol. 4	4:37
3.	"Visions of Johanna"	Previously released on The Bootleg Series Vol. 4	8:09
4.	"It's All Over Now, Baby Blue"	Previously released on The Bootleg Series Vol. 4	5:46
5.	"Desolation Row"	Previously released on The Bootleg Series Vol. 4	11:32
6.	"Just Like a Woman"	Previously released on The Bootleg Series Vol. 4	5:52
7.	"Mr. Tambourine Man"	Previously released on The Bootleg Series Vol. 4	8:52
Total length:			48:15

Disc 20 – Manchester, England, 17 May 1966 (CBS Records recording except Track 9 Soundcheck / Soundboard)
No.	Title	Info	Length
1.	"Tell Me, Momma"	Previously released on The Bootleg Series Vol. 4	5:10
2.	"I Don't Believe You (She Acts Like We Never Have Met)"	Previously released on The Bootleg Series Vol. 4	6:07
3.	"Baby, Let Me Follow You Down"	Previously released on The Bootleg Series Vol. 4	3:46
4.	"Just Like Tom Thumb's Blues"	Previously released on The Bootleg Series Vol. 4	6:50
5.	"Leopard-Skin Pill-Box Hat"	Previously released on The Bootleg Series Vol. 4	4:50
6.	"One Too Many Mornings"	Previously released on The Bootleg Series Vol. 4	4:22
7.	"Ballad of a Thin Man"	Previously released on The Bootleg Series Vol. 4	7:55
8.	"Like a Rolling Stone"	Previously released on The Bootleg Series Vol. 4	8:05
9.	"Just Like Tom Thumb's Blues"	Incomplete (soundcheck)	1:09
Total length:			48:14

Disc 21 – Glasgow, Scotland, 19 May 1966 (Soundboard)
No.	Title	Info	Length
1.	"It's All Over Now, Baby Blue"		5:48
2.	"Desolation Row"	Incomplete	10:13
3.	"Just Like a Woman"		7:10
4.	"Mr. Tambourine Man"		9:52
5.	"Tell Me, Momma"		4:58
6.	"I Don't Believe You (She Acts Like We Never Have Met)"		5:29
7.	"Baby, Let Me Follow You Down"		3:41
8.	"Just Like Tom Thumb's Blues"		6:12
9.	"Leopard-Skin Pill-Box Hat"		4:19
10.	"One Too Many Mornings"	Incomplete	3:59
11.	"Ballad of a Thin Man"		7:09
12.	"Like a Rolling Stone"		10:20
Total length:			79:10

Disc 22 – Edinburgh, Scotland, 20 May 1966 (Soundboard)
No.	Title	Info	Length
1.	"She Belongs to Me"		4:06
2.	"Fourth Time Around"		4:49
3.	"Visions of Johanna"		10:01
4.	"It's All Over Now, Baby Blue"		6:42
5.	"Desolation Row"	Incomplete	8:52
6.	"Just Like a Woman"		6:42
7.	"Mr. Tambourine Man"		9:01
Total length:			50:13

Disc 23 – Edinburgh, Scotland, 20 May 1966 (Soundboard)
No.	Title	Info	Length
1.	"Tell Me, Momma"		4:47
2.	"I Don't Believe You (She Acts Like We Never Have Met)"		5:38
3.	"Baby, Let Me Follow You Down"		3:43
4.	"Just Like Tom Thumb's Blues"		5:49
5.	"Leopard-Skin Pill-Box Hat"		3:55
6.	"One Too Many Mornings"		4:21
7.	"Ballad of a Thin Man"	Previously released on The Bootleg Series Vol. 7	7:41
8.	"Like a Rolling Stone"		9:02
Total length:			44:56

Disc 24 – Newcastle, England, 21 May 1966 (Soundboard)
No.	Title	Info	Length
1.	"She Belongs to Me"	Incomplete	2:42
2.	"Fourth Time Around"		4:57
3.	"Visions of Johanna"		7:52
4.	"It's All Over Now, Baby Blue"		5:50
5.	"Desolation Row"	Incomplete	10:12
6.	"Just Like a Woman"		6:12
7.	"Mr. Tambourine Man"		9:40
Total length:			47:25

Disc 25 – Newcastle, England, 21 May 1966 (Soundboard)
No.	Title	Info	Length
1.	"Tell Me, Momma"		4:27
2.	"I Don't Believe You (She Acts Like We Never Have Met)"		5:30
3.	"Baby, Let Me Follow You Down"		3:47
4.	"Just Like Tom Thumb's Blues"		6:16
5.	"Leopard-Skin Pill-Box Hat"		4:07
6.	"One Too Many Mornings"		3:27
7.	"Ballad of a Thin Man"		7:28
8.	"Like a Rolling Stone"	Audio actually from Cardiff – mixing error	8:22
Total length:			43:24

Disc 26 – Paris, France, 24 May 1966 (Soundboard)
No.	Title	Info	Length
1.	"She Belongs to Me"		4:32
2.	"Fourth Time Around"		5:19
3.	"Visions of Johanna"		9:43
4.	"It's All Over Now, Baby Blue"		7:34
5.	"Desolation Row"	Incomplete	8:03
6.	"Just Like a Woman"		11:30
7.	"Mr. Tambourine Man"		9:18
Total length:			55:59

Disc 27 – Paris, France, 24 May 1966 (Soundboard)
No.	Title	Length
1.	"Tell Me, Momma"	4:18
2.	"I Don't Believe You (She Acts Like We Never Have Met)"	5:52
3.	"Baby, Let Me Follow You Down"	3:37
4.	"Just Like Tom Thumb's Blues"	7:04
5.	"Leopard-Skin Pill-Box Hat"	4:11
6.	"One Too Many Mornings"	3:47
7.	"Ballad of a Thin Man"	7:50
8.	"Like a Rolling Stone"	8:53
Total length:		45:32

Disc 28 – London, England, 26 May 1966 (CBS Records recording)
No.	Title	Info	Length
1.	"She Belongs to Me"		3:51
2.	"Fourth Time Around"		4:32
3.	"Visions of Johanna"	Previously released (slightly edited) on Biograph	7:57
4.	"It's All Over Now, Baby Blue"		5:53
5.	"Desolation Row"		12:05
6.	"Just Like a Woman"		5:26
7.	"Mr. Tambourine Man"		9:16
Total length:			49:00

Disc 29 – London, England, 26 May 1966 (CBS Records recording)
No.	Title	Length
1.	"Tell Me, Momma"	4:52
2.	"I Don't Believe You (She Acts Like We Never Have Met)"	6:27
3.	"Baby, Let Me Follow You Down"	3:43
4.	"Just Like Tom Thumb's Blues"	6:15
5.	"Leopard-Skin Pill-Box Hat"	4:05
6.	"One Too Many Mornings"	4:08
7.	"Ballad of a Thin Man"	7:23
8.	"Like a Rolling Stone"	8:25
Total length:		45:18

Disc 30 – London, England, 27 May 1966 (CBS Records recording)
No.	Title	Length
1.	"She Belongs to Me"	5:12
2.	"Fourth Time Around"	5:25
3.	"Visions of Johanna"	10:41
4.	"It's All Over Now, Baby Blue"	7:01
5.	"Desolation Row"	13:23
6.	"Just Like a Woman"	7:48
7.	"Mr. Tambourine Man"	10:29
Total length:		59:59

Disc 31 – London, England, 27 May 1966 (CBS Records recording)
No.	Title	Length
1.	"Tell Me, Momma"	8:54
2.	"I Don't Believe You (She Acts Like We Never Have Met)"	5:45
3.	"Baby, Let Me Follow You Down"	3:44
4.	"Just Like Tom Thumb's Blues"	8:19
5.	"Leopard-Skin Pill-Box Hat"	4:07
6.	"One Too Many Mornings"	5:18
7.	"Ballad of a Thin Man"	9:45
8.	"Like a Rolling Stone"	9:55
Total length:		55:47

Disc 32 – White Plains, NY, USA, 5 February 1966 (Audience tape)
No.	Title	Info	Length
1.	"She Belongs to Me"		3:16
2.	"To Ramona"		4:57
3.	"Visions of Johanna"		7:25
4.	"It's All Over Now, Baby Blue"		5:24
5.	"Desolation Row"		10:51
6.	"Love Minus Zero/No Limit"		4:21
7.	"Mr. Tambourine Man"		7:26
8.	"Tell Me, Momma"		4:02
9.	"I Don't Believe You (She Acts Like We Never Have Met)"	Incomplete	4:40
Total length:			52:22

Disc 33 – Pittsburgh, PA, US, 6 February 1966 (Audience tape)
No.	Title	Info	Length
1.	"She Belongs to Me"		3:37
2.	"To Ramona"		6:12
3.	"Visions of Johanna"		7:27
4.	"Desolation Row"	Incomplete	2:54
5.	"Love Minus Zero/No Limit"	Incomplete	3:53
6.	"Mr. Tambourine Man"		7:43
7.	"Positively 4th Street"		4:22
8.	"Like a Rolling Stone"		6:57
Total length:			43:05

Disc 34 – Hempstead, NY, US, 26 February 1966 (Audience tape)
No.	Title	Info	Length
1.	"She Belongs to Me"	Incomplete	2:59
2.	"Fourth Time Around"		3:56
3.	"Visions of Johanna"		6:59
4.	"It's All Over Now, Baby Blue"		4:55
5.	"Desolation Row"		9:53
6.	"Love Minus Zero/No Limit"		3:48
7.	"Mr. Tambourine Man"		7:02
8.	"Tell Me, Momma"		3:42
9.	"I Don't Believe You (She Acts Like We Never Have Met)"		5:29
10.	"Baby, Let Me Follow You Down"		3:44
11.	"Just Like Tom Thumb's Blues"		6:20
12.	"Leopard-Skin Pill-Box Hat"		3:58
13.	"One Too Many Mornings"	Incomplete	1:17
Total length:			64:02

Disc 35 – Melbourne, Australia, 19 April 1966 (Audience tape)
No.	Title	Info	Length
1.	"She Belongs to Me"		3:40
2.	"Fourth Time Around"		4:49
3.	"Visions of Johanna"		7:39
4.	"It's All Over Now, Baby Blue"		5:30
5.	"Desolation Row"		9:27
6.	"Just Like a Woman"		5:56
7.	"Mr. Tambourine Man"		7:46
8.	"Tell Me, Momma"		4:11
9.	"I Don't Believe You (She Acts Like We Never Have Met)"		5:34
10.	"Baby, Let Me Follow You Down"		3:50
11.	"Just Like Tom Thumb's Blues"		5:43
12.	"Leopard-Skin Pill-Box Hat"	Fragment	0:13
Total length:			64:18

Disc 36 – Stockholm, Sweden, 29 April 1966 (Audience tape)
No.	Title	Info	Length
1.	"She Belongs to Me"		3:13
2.	"Fourth Time Around"		4:07
3.	"Visions of Johanna"		7:18
4.	"It's All Over Now, Baby Blue"		5:10
5.	"Desolation Row"	Incomplete	4:30
6.	"I Don't Believe You (She Acts Like We Never Have Met)"		5:02
7.	"Baby, Let Me Follow You Down"		3:19
8.	"Just Like Tom Thumb's Blues"	Fragment	0:37
9.	"Leopard-Skin Pill-Box Hat"	Incomplete	3:09
10.	"One Too Many Mornings"	Incomplete	2:15
11.	"Ballad of a Thin Man"	Incomplete	6:03
Total length:			44:43

== Musicians ==
- Bob Dylan – acoustic guitar, electric guitar, harmonica, piano, lead vocal
- Robbie Robertson – electric guitar
- Rick Danko – bass guitar, background vocal
- Garth Hudson – organ
- Richard Manuel – piano
- Mickey Jones – drums
- Sandy Konikoff – drums (before March 26, 1966)

Musicians per Olof Bjorner.

== Charts ==
Chart performance for The 1966 Live Recordings
Chart (2016)	Peak position
Austrian Albums (Ö3 Austria)	63
Belgian Albums (Ultratop Flanders)	88
Belgian Albums (Ultratop Wallonia)	197
Dutch Albums (Album Top 100)	60
French Albums (SNEP)	152
German Albums (Offizielle Top 100)	38
Italian Albums (FIMI)	54
Swiss Albums (Schweizer Hitparade)	100

== See also ==
- Bob Dylan World Tour 1966
