= She Belongs to Me =

- Swedish release picture sleeve

Single by Bob Dylan

from the album Bringing It All Back Home
- A-side: "Subterranean Homesick Blues"
- Released: March 22, 1965
- Recorded: January 14, 1965
- Studio: Columbia Recording, New York City
- Genre: Folk rock; blues rock
- Length: 2:50
- Label: Columbia
- Songwriter: Bob Dylan
- Producer: Tom Wilson

Bob Dylan singles chronology
"The Times They Are a-Changin'" (1965)	"She Belongs to Me" (1965)	"Maggie's Farm" (1965)

"She Belongs to Me" is a song by Bob Dylan, and was first released as the second track on his 1965 album Bringing It All Back Home. The song may be about a former girlfriend, Suze Rotolo, or fellow folk singer Joan Baez, contemporary siren Nico, or Sara Lownds, the woman that Dylan would wed in November 1965.

== Recording ==
The version of the song that appears on Bringing It All Back Home was recorded on the afternoon of January 14, 1965, and produced by Tom Wilson. Dylan performed it with the rock band that accompanied him on the songs on side one of the album, with Bruce Langhorne playing the electric guitar.

Different versions of the song were recorded during the January 1965 sessions for Bringing It All Back Home. Like the other love song on side one, "Love Minus Zero/No Limit", "She Belongs to Me" had been recorded on January 13, 1965, in acoustic versions. An outtake featuring Dylan, Langhorne, and bassist Bill Lee—stated in the liner notes to have been recorded on January 14, but which Dylan scholar Clinton Heylin dates to January 13—was released in 2005 on The Bootleg Series Vol. 7: No Direction Home: The Soundtrack. The January 13 recordings and a first take from January 14 were released on the 6-disc and 18-disc versions of The Bootleg Series Vol. 12: The Cutting Edge 1965–1966 in 2015. (The song was also recorded with just guitars and bass on the evening of January 14, an uncirculated version.) The title of the song was initially listed as "Worse Than Money" at the January 13, 1965 sessions, and then was listed as "My Girl" briefly at the January 14 sessions.

== Meaning ==
The title of the song is perhaps ironic. The woman described in the song perhaps belongs to no one, as suggested by the lyric "She's nobody's child, the law can't touch her at all." However that is open to interpretation. The lyrics describe how the singer "bow[s] down to her on Sunday" and "salute[s] her when her birthday comes." Other lines celebrate the woman's assertiveness and moral conviction. The lyrics may refer to Suze Rotolo, Dylan's girlfriend from July 1961 to early 1964. Some of the lyrics of "She Belongs to Me" could refer to Dylan's former lover, folk singer Joan Baez, particularly the line about the woman wearing an "Egyptian ring", since Dylan had given Baez such a ring.

Additionally, the line "She takes the dark out of the nighttime / And paints the daytime black," resembles a verse of the Old Testament book of Job, verse 5:14 stating: "They meet with darkness in the daytime, / and grope in the noonday as in the night."

Other lines that may refer to Baez are a line describing her as "an artist" and a reference to being a "walking antique", which may be a reference to Baez' desire to keep Dylan writing protest songs but could easily be a compliment.

John Cale of the Velvet Underground has stated that he believes the song to be about Nico, with whom Dylan spent some time around the time of the song's composition.

British artist Caroline Coon claims the song is about her on her website.

An alternative interpretation of the song is that it is a paean to Dylan's muse, depicting it as unapproachable but domineering.

== Musical style ==
Any perceived or imagined bitterness in the lyrics is offset by the gentleness of Dylan's singing and the delicacy of the accompaniment. Most people would not see any bitterness in these lyrics. The song is in a symmetrical 12-bar blues form. Music critic Robert Shelton has described the song as having a melody that is gentle, with relaxed phrasing and a swaying, waltz-like rhythm, although it does not use the 3/4 time signature of a waltz but rather a 4/4 time signature. The song is written in the key of A major, with a repeating chord progression of I, IV, and II.

== Critical reception ==
In its contemporary review of the single release, Cash Box described it as a "feelingful blue shuffler."

In a 2005 reader's poll reported in Mojo, "She Belongs to Me" was listed as the #98 all time Bob Dylan song, and a similar poll of artists ranked the song #53. In 2002, Uncut listed it as the #14 all time Bob Dylan song.

== Other releases ==
The song, first released on Bringing It All Back Home in 1965, has been subsequently released on several Dylan compilation and live albums, including Bob Dylan's Greatest Hits Vol. II in 1971. It was also included in Martin Scorsese's film No Direction Home and released on its soundtrack album, The Bootleg Series Vol. 7: No Direction Home: The Soundtrack, in 2005, in the form of an outtake from the original recording sessions.

A live performance from Dylan's 1969 Isle of Wight Festival performance was released on Self Portrait in 1970, in which Dylan sings in his country-crooner voice similar to the Nashville Skyline album, and the backing band plays in a country style. The song opened the famous May 17, 1966 concert in Manchester's Free Trade Hall, England (popularly but mistakenly known as the "Royal Albert Hall" concert), released on The Bootleg Series Vol. 4: Bob Dylan Live 1966, The "Royal Albert Hall" Concert in 1998. A May 10, 1965 performance of the song at the Royal Albert Hall was released in 2018 on Live 1962-1966: Rare Performances From The Copyright Collections.

In November 2016, all Dylan's recorded live performances of the song from 1966 were released in the boxed set The 1966 Live Recordings, with the May 26, 1966 performance released separately on the album The Real Royal Albert Hall 1966 Concert.

== Cover versions ==
In 1969, Ricky Nelson released a country rock version of "She Belongs to Me" which reached No. 33 on the Billboard Hot 100 chart.
