= Visions of Johanna =

1966 song by Bob Dylan

Song by Bob Dylan

from the album Blonde on Blonde
- Released: June 20, 1966
- Recorded: February 14, 1966
- Genre: Folk rock
- Length: 7:30
- Label: Columbia
- Songwriter: Bob Dylan
- Producer: Bob Johnston

"Visions of Johanna" is a song written and performed by Bob Dylan on his 1966 album Blonde on Blonde. Several critics have acclaimed "Visions of Johanna" as one of Dylan's highest achievements in writing, praising the allusiveness and subtlety of the language. Rolling Stone included "Visions of Johanna" on their list of the "500 Greatest Songs of All Time". In 1999, Sir Andrew Motion, Poet Laureate of the United Kingdom, listed it as the greatest song lyric ever written.

Dylan first recorded the song in New York City in November 1965, under the working title of "Freeze Out", but was dissatisfied with the results. When the Blonde on Blonde recording sessions moved to Nashville in February 1966, Dylan attempted the composition again with different musicians, and decided to release this performance. All of the alternate versions of the song have been officially released, but some only on a limited edition collectors set: many of them are November 1965 or later 1966 studio outtakes, and two others are live performances from his 1966 world tour.

Numerous artists have recorded cover versions of the song, including the Grateful Dead, Cat Power, Marianne Faithfull, Chris Smither, and Robyn Hitchcock.

== Sources ==
Scholar Laurence Coupe has argued that the identity of the title character "echoes" Jack Kerouac's Visions of Gerard (written 1956, published 1963), and the song as a whole, like the novel, "would seem to be about the hunger for beatific experience—the hope that the sacred realm might yet be glimpsed within the profane. Johanna, like Gerard, represents the salvation that comes out of suffering. But unlike Kerouac, Dylan depicts this possibility as tauntingly remote—a cause of suffering in itself."

== Recording ==
Clinton Heylin places the writing of "Visions of Johanna" in the fall of 1965, when Dylan was living in the Chelsea Hotel with his pregnant wife Sara. Heylin notes that "in this déclassé hotel...the heat pipes still cough", referring to a line from the song. Greil Marcus reports that when the song was first released, "the story was that the song had been written during the great East Coast blackout of November 9, 1965."

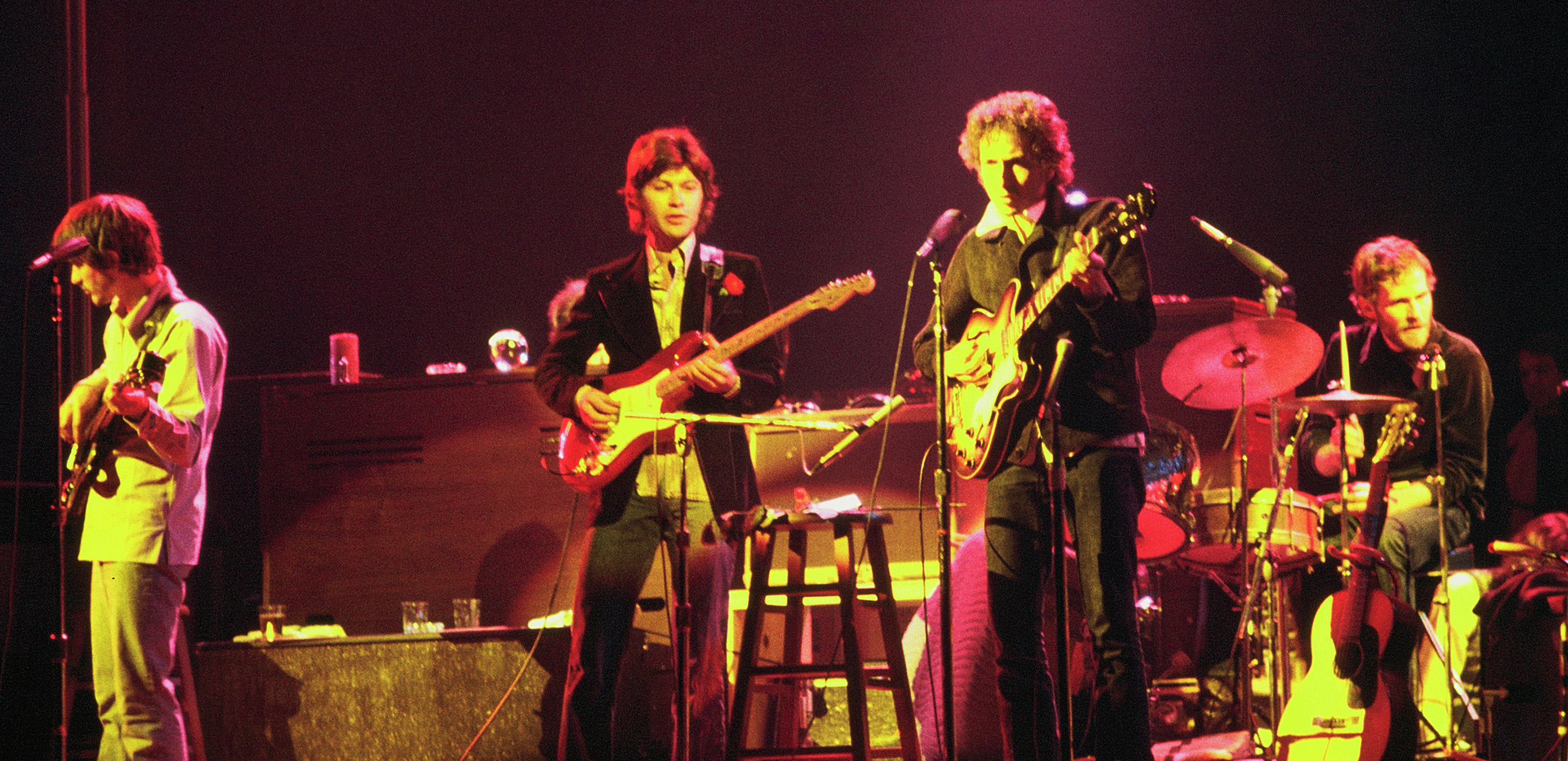
Dylan performs with The Band on their 1974 tour. Dylan's first attempt to record "Visions of Johanna" in 1965 was backed by members of this group, known in their earlier incarnation as The Hawks.

Dylan first recorded this song, backed by The Hawks, in the CBS New York recording studio, on November 30, 1965, announcing his new composition with the words: "This is called 'Freeze Out'." Andy Gill notes that this working title captures the "air of nocturnal suspension in which the verse tableaux are sketched...full of whispering and muttering." According to Marcus, Dylan introduced the song in live performances in 1966 with the words "Seems like a Freeze Out." In an early live performance in December 1965 in San Francisco, Dylan also suggested a possible title as "Alcatraz to the 9th Power Revisited".

Some of the New York recordings were uptempo and contain in the fifth verse the additional line "He examines the nightingale's code". Historian Sean Wilentz, for his book Dylan in America, listened closely to full studio tapes of the Blonde on Blonde sessions, and describes how Dylan guided the New York backing musicians through fourteen takes, trying to explain how he wanted "Visions of Johanna" played. At one point, Dylan says: "It's not hard rock. The only thing in it that's hard is Robbie." Analyzing the evolution of the song in the New York recording session, Wilentz writes that Dylan "quiets things down, inching closer to what will eventually appear on Blonde on Blonde—and it is still not right." Several complete takes of the song were recorded on November 30, including one with an uptempo rock beat, containing harpsichord accompaniment, and another with a march-like tempo, which was released on The Bootleg Series Vol. 7: No Direction Home: The Soundtrack in 2005.

Visions of Johanna
Describing "Visions of Johanna" as "Dylan's most haunting and complex love song and his finest poem", Robert Shelton suggests that Dylan "constantly seeks to transcend the physical world, to reach the ideal where the visions of Johanna become real".

"Visions of Johanna" fell into place when Dylan was persuaded by his producer, Bob Johnston, to move the recording sessions to Nashville, Tennessee. During his first day in the CBS Nashville studio, on February 14, 1966, the Blonde on Blonde version of the song was recorded. In an interview with Andy Gill, Al Kooper has said that he and guitarist Robbie Robertson became sensitive to the nuances of Dylan's vocal. Kooper added that "it's very important what Joe South's bass is doing in that"; Kooper described it as "this throbbing...rhythmically amazing bass part". Other backing musicians were Charlie McCoy, guitar, Wayne Moss, guitar, and Kenneth Buttrey on drums.

== Live performances and studio outtakes ==
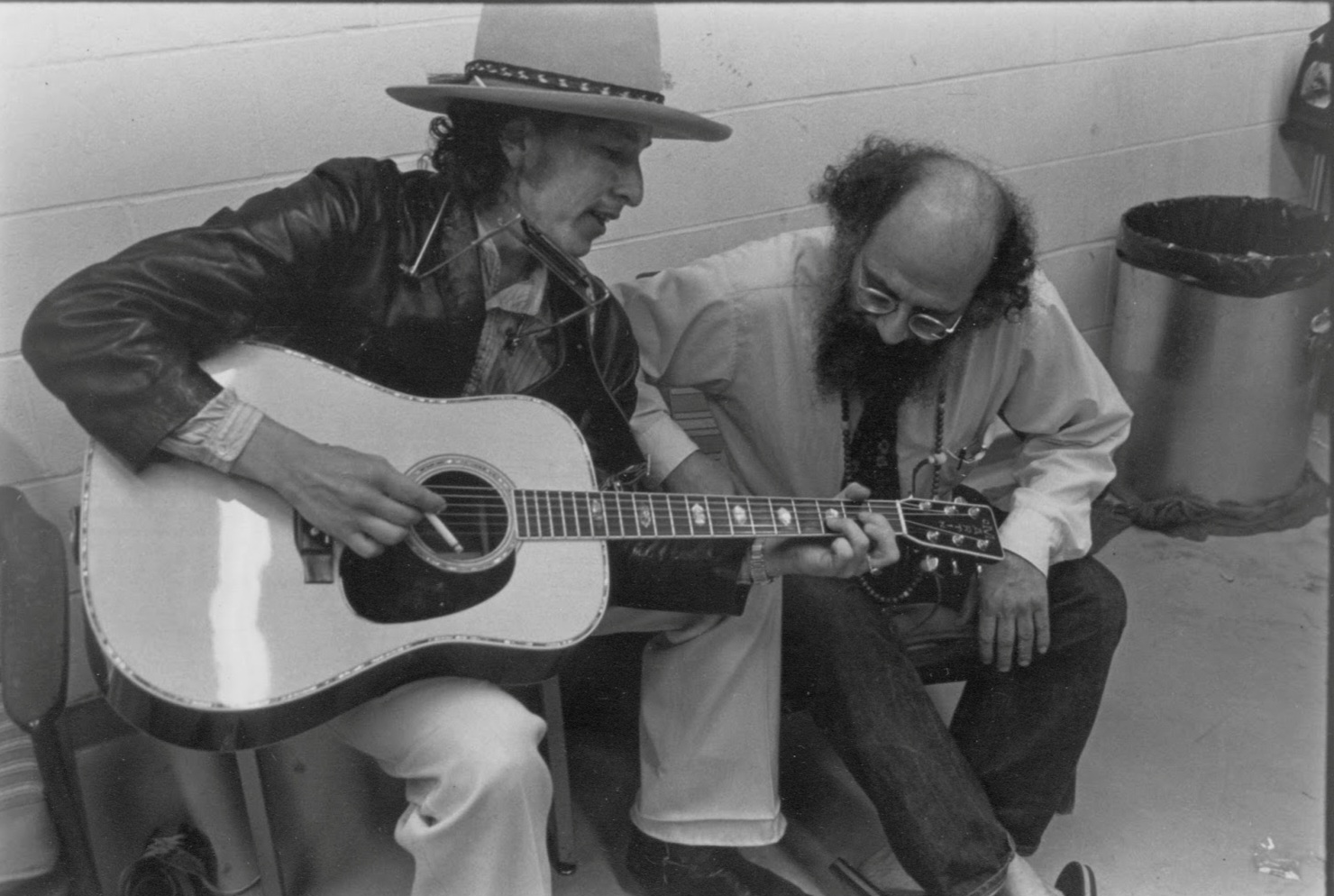
Dylan plays a song to Allen Ginsberg during the Rolling Thunder Revue of 1975. Ginsberg's poetic technique has been cited as an influence on Dylan at the time he wrote "Visions of Johanna".

Dylan first performed "Visions of Johanna" in public on December 4, 1965, at the Berkeley Community Theatre. Present at this concert was Joan Baez, who believed the lyrics referred to her. She said, "He'd just written 'Visions of Johanna', which sounded very suspicious to me...he'd never performed it before and Neuwirth told him I was there that night and he performed it." Heylin suggests that if Dylan performed it for anyone that night it was Allen Ginsberg, who was also present. Heylin argues Dylan considered Ginsberg to be an important influence on his songwriting at this juncture, and was keen to showcase the song for the Beat poet.

All live versions of the song recorded during Dylan's 1966 tour of England have been released. Dylan's performance of the song at London's Royal Albert Hall on May 26, 1966, appeared on Biograph, released in 1985. Asked by Cameron Crowe, for the liner notes for Biograph, how he could remember the words of such a complex song in live performance, Dylan responded, "I could remember a song without writing it down because it was so visual." A performance of the song recorded at the Manchester Free Trade Hall on May 17, 1966, was released on The Bootleg Series Vol. 4: Bob Dylan Live 1966 in 1998. In addition, a May 6, 1966, performance of the song, recorded in Belfast, was included on Live 1962-1966: Rare Performances From The Copyright Collections, released in 2018.

On November 11, 2016, Legacy Recordings released a 36-CD boxed set, The 1966 Live Recordings, which comprises every known recording of Bob Dylan's 1966 concert tour. The recordings commence with the concert in White Plains, New York on February 5, 1966, and end with the Royal Albert Hall concert in London on May 27. The set contains 18 live performances of "Visions of Johanna", all featuring Dylan solo on acoustic guitar. (The May 26, 1966, performance was included on the separately released album The Real Royal Albert Hall 1966 Concert.)

The "Visions of Johanna" studio recording sessions were released in their entirety on the 18-disc Collector's Edition of The Bootleg Series Vol. 12: The Cutting Edge 1965–1966 on November 6, 2015, with highlights from the November 30, 1965, outtakes appearing on the 6-disc and 2-disc versions of that album. The 18-disc version contains 14 takes of "Visions of Johanna" recorded in New York on November 30, 1965, and 4 takes of the song recorded in Nashville on February 14, 1966, the last being the Blonde on Blonde version of the song.

== Interpretation ==
Noting how popular "Visions of Johanna" remains among "hardcore Dylanophiles," Andy Gill suggests it is the enigmatic quality of the song that is responsible for its popularity—"forever teetering on the brink of lucidity, yet remaining impervious to strict decipherment". Gill writes that the song begins by contrasting two lovers, the carnal Louise, and "the more spiritual but unattainable" Johanna. Ultimately, for Gill, the song seeks to convey how the artist is compelled to keep striving to pursue some elusive vision of perfection.

Clinton Heylin has described what he construes as the strange circumstances surrounding the song. Written around the time of Dylan's marriage to Sara Lownds, Heylin describes it as "one of the oddest songs ever written by a man who has just tied the knot and is enjoying a brief honeymoon in the city". Noting that the song is an elegy for a past lover, Heylin speculates that "it is awfully tempting to see Johanna as his muse," who, in the song, is "not here". For Heylin, the triumph of the song lies in "the way Dylan manages to write about the most inchoate feelings in such a vivid, immediate way".

Dylan critic Michael Gray also praises the subtlety of the song. Gray acknowledges that it is difficult to say what this song is "about", since it is at once indefinable and precise. For Gray, its principal achievement lies in the way it confuses categories, using language to be simultaneously serious and flippant, delicate and coarse, and mixing up "abstract neo-philosophy and figurative phraseology".

Robert Shelton called "Visions of Johanna" one of Dylan's major works. He writes that Dylan's technique of throwing out "skittering images" evokes "a mind floating downstream"; these "non-sequential visions" are the record of a fractured consciousness. Shelton argues that the song explores a hopeless quest to reach an ideal, the visions of Johanna, and yet without this quest life becomes meaningless. He suggests that the same paradox is explored by Keats in his "Ode on a Grecian Urn".

Mike Marqusee situates the song in New York City, "a flickering, electric, ghostly, cityscape". Dylan describes himself stranded in a fog of detachment which provides a haven, and at the same time is pained by a piercing clarity: an unmediated response that is "too concise and too clear". For Marqusee, Dylan describes his predicament, suspended between freedom and slavery, yet hungry for an authentic experience. Johanna and Louise are objects of desire and yearning. "It is their elusiveness and unreality that's the point."

Guitarist and critic Bill Janovitz also emphasizes the urban, unreal quality of "Visions of Johanna", calling it a "sprawling epic". "The journey takes Dylan through lofts, the D train, a museum, empty lots, and through snippets of overheard conversation, as well as a discussion with some 'little boy lost', who 'takes himself so seriously', and who is 'so useless and all/muttering small talk at the wall'." For Janovitz, this could "possibly be a swipe at a critic".

Literary critic Christopher Ricks, in his study of Dylan's work, pinpoints the emotional effect of these same lines:

He's sure got a lotta gall to be so useless and all
Muttering small talk at the wall while I’m in the hall

Ricks writes that the phrase "and all" turns a mood of helplessness into a sense of "aggression and baffled anger".

Trying to unravel the mystery of the song, Greil Marcus writes that the song is concerned with internal questions, rather than external ones: "Line by line, 'Blowin' in the Wind' is pious, or falsely innocent—isn't it obvious that whoever wrote "Yes, 'n' how many seas must a white dove sail / Before she sleeps in the sand?" already knows the answer, assuming he, or anyone, can actually bring themselves to care about such a precious question? But 'Visions of Johanna' is asking different sorts of questions. Such as: Where are you? Who are you? What are you doing here?" Evoking the drugged, urban milieu of the song, Marcus writes of "People wandering from one corner of a loft to another, doped, drunk, half-awake, fast asleep, no point to the next breath, let alone the next step." For Marcus, "'Visions of Johanna' makes a narrative solely out of atmosphere."

== Legacy ==
The song has been described by several critics as a masterpiece. In 2004, Rolling Stone magazine placed the song at No. 404 on their list of the "500 Greatest Songs of All Time", commenting that Dylan "never sounded lonelier than in this seven-minute ballad, cut in a single take on Valentine's Day 1966." (When Rolling Stone updated their list in 2010, the song dropped to No. 413, and then it was moved up to No. 317 in 2021.) In 1999, Britain's Poet Laureate, Andrew Motion, chose it as his candidate for the best song lyric ever written. Motion praised "the concentration and surprise" of Dylan's lyrics, and said that, although he distanced himself from some of the singer's views about women, the "rasp of his anger" was a part of his greatness. In 2017, the International Observer named the song the second best ever recorded, stating, "The 24 year old Dylan was beginning to realize that no matter how many perfect songs he wrote he could not achieve immortality through his art as he perhaps once believed, because even if people were still listening to the music in 500 years, he would still be dead." In 2020, during an appearance on The Late Show with Stephen Colbert, Bruce Springsteen cited "Visions of Johanna" as one of his three favorite Dylan songs (along with "Like a Rolling Stone" and "Ring Them Bells"). In an interview with The Independent in 1992, cult British musician Robyn Hitchcock described the song by saying "it's pretty much the reason I'm a singer". Commenting on the song in a 1985 interview, Dylan said, "I still sing that song every once in a while. It still stands up now as it did then, maybe even more in some kind of weird way."

== Cover versions ==
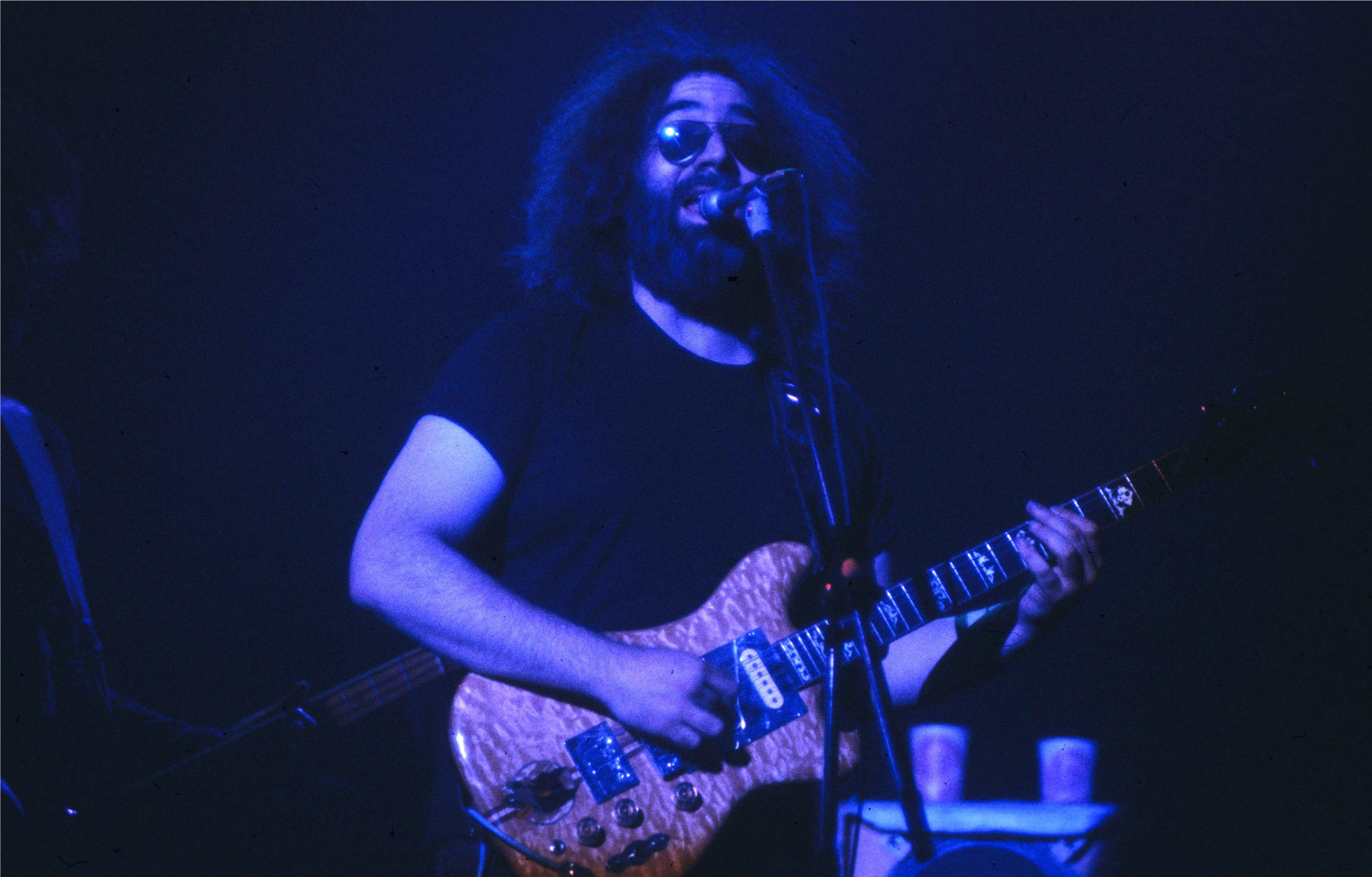
Jerry Garcia recorded "Visions of Johanna" both as a solo artist and as a member of the Grateful Dead. Jerry, a non-lyricist for the most part, brought out the beauty of the melody of Dylan's compositions.

The Grateful Dead played "Visions of Johanna" in concert a number of times between 1986 and 1995, and both they and Jerry Garcia solo each released a live version on record. There is also a 16-minute studio version of the song on Jerry Garcia's All Good Things Redux, a bonus CD provided with the All Good Things box set of Garcia's studio recordings.

Other artists who have covered the song include Cat Power, Marianne Faithfull, Robyn Hitchcock, Lee Ranaldo, Chris Smither, former Flamin' Groovies guitarist Chris Wilson, Julie Felix, Maggie Holland, and Old Crow Medicine Show. The jazz trio Jewels and Binoculars, who named themselves after a phrase from "Visions of Johanna", recorded an instrumental treatment of the song on their album The Music of Bob Dylan. Foreign language versions of the song include a recording by Jan Erik Vold, Kåre Virud and Telemark Blueslag in Norwegian, Gerard Quintana's and Jordi Batiste's version in Catalan, Steffen Brandt's in Danish, and Ernst Jansz's in Dutch.
