= One Too Many Mornings =

Song by Bob Dylan

from the album The Times They Are a-Changin'
- Released: January 13, 1964
- Recorded: October 24, 1963
- Genre: Folk
- Length: 2:41
- Label: Columbia
- Songwriter: Bob Dylan
- Producer: Tom Wilson

"One Too Many Mornings" is a song by Bob Dylan, released on his third studio album The Times They Are a-Changin' in 1964. The chords and vocal melody are in some places very similar to the song "The Times They Are A-Changin'". "One Too Many Mornings" is in the key of C Major and is fingerpicked.

== Dylan recordings ==
In addition to featuring the song on The Times They Are a-Changin', Dylan subsequently performed "One Too Many Mornings" in electric arrangements -- notably during his 1966 world tour and in 1976 during his second Rolling Thunder Revue tour. Dylan's May 17, 1966 live performance of the song, recorded at Manchester Free Trade Hall, was featured on The Bootleg Series Vol. 4: Bob Dylan Live 1966, The "Royal Albert Hall" Concert (1998), while a "Rolling Thunder" version was featured on the live album Hard Rain (1976). In 2016, all Dylan's recorded live performances of the song from 1966 were released in the boxed set The 1966 Live Recordings, with the May 26, 1966 performance released separately on the album The Real Royal Albert Hall 1966 Concert.

In 1967, Dylan recorded a version of the song with The Band on which he shares vocals with Richard Manuel which was included on various unofficial bootleg albums, before being officially released in 2014 on Dylan's album The Bootleg Series Vol. 11: The Basement Tapes Complete.

In 2020, Dylan released a version of the song from a 1970 recording session with George Harrison on the limited edition issue, 50th Anniversary Collection: 1970.

== Other recordings ==
Johnny Cash covered the song numerous times, including on the album Johnny & June in 1978. He also recorded two versions of the song with Dylan while Dylan was recording Nashville Skyline. The song, along with several others he recorded with Dylan, were released in 2019 on Travelin' Thru—The Bootleg Series Volume 15 1967-1969. Cash would cover it again as a duet with Waylon Jennings for the album Heroes. In 2012, a remix combining Cash's original vocals with new recordings by the Avett Brothers was included on the benefit album Chimes of Freedom: The Songs of Bob Dylan Honoring 50 Years of Amnesty International. In 2014, Willie Nelson and Kris Kristofferson, who, along with Jennings and Cash made up the supergroup The Highwaymen, added their vocals to the Heroes track.

Other versions include:

- Ian A. Anderson's cover version was included on the compilation album Please Re-adjust Your Time: The Early Blues and Psych-Folk Years 1967-1972.
- The Association covered the song, which Valiant Records released on a non-album single in November 1965. The song failed to appear on Billboard magazine's Hot 100 chart, but it became a regional hit in the Los Angeles area.
- The Beau Brummels covered the song on a single which charted at number 95 in 1966.
- Joan Baez covered this song on her 1968 album of Dylan covers, Any Day Now. The 2002 Vanguard reissue of Farewell, Angelina also includes a previously unreleased version sung by Baez.
- The Band, whose original lineup backed Dylan on the song during his 1966 world tour, covered the song for the 1999 album Tangled Up in Blues. Rick Danko and Garth Hudson, who appeared on the 1967 Basement Tapes recording with Dylan, recorded the song along with later members of the group. It was The Band's final recording.
- BAP covered this song (as Su 'Ne Morje) on their 1983 live album Live – bess demnähx… with lyrics in the Kölsch dialect of German.
- Dion DiMucci featured "One Too Many Mornings" on his 1992 album Dream On Fire.
- David Gray covered this song on his live cover album A Thousand Miles Behind (named for a lyric from this song).
- Steve Howe covered this song on his 1999 album of Dylan covers, Portraits of Bob Dylan.
- Burl Ives covered this song on his 1968 album The Times They Are A-Changin'.
- The Kingston Trio covered the song on the album Once Upon a Time, released in 1969 (two years after the group disbanded).
- Angel Olsen covered the song for the soundtrack of the streaming television series Shining Girls.
- The Panics covered the song on their Cruel Guards Bonus CD.
- Draco Rosa covered the song in his 2008 album Vino.
- Bobby Sherman covered the song as the flip side of his 1969 45 rpm single "Little Woman".
- Jerry Jeff Walker covered the song, a live version of which may be found on the Walker's Collectables / Ridin' High double album.
