= Newcastle Odeon =

Former cinema in Newcastle, England

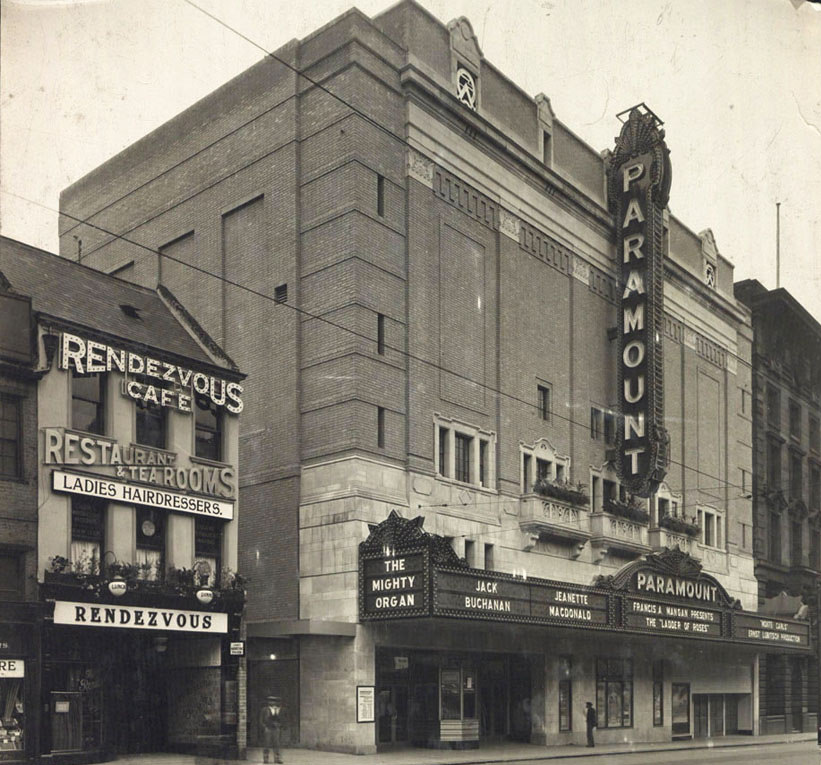
The cinema in 1931

Location within Tyne and Wear

Newcastle Odeon was a 2,602-seat cinema located in Pilgrim Street in Newcastle upon Tyne, England. It opened as the Paramount Theatre on September 7, 1931 before being purchased by Odeon Cinemas on November 27, 1939 and renamed the Odeon on 22nd April 1940. During the 1960s and 1970s it was also used for pop and rock concerts.

In 1975, the cinema was tripled, with a 1,228-seat Screen 1 created from the original balcony and 158-seat (Screen 2) and 250-seat (Screen 3) screens created in the former stalls area. A 361-seat Screen 4 was added in 1980 using the former stage area.

In 1999, the cinema was Grade II listed by English Heritage due to its partially-surviving opulent interior. In 2001, Odeon Theatres successfully appealed the listing and the cinema closed in 2002. It lay empty until finally being demolished in 2017.
