= No Direction Home =

2005 documentary film by Martin Scorsese

- DVD cover
- Directed by: Martin Scorsese
- Starring: Bob Dylan
- Country of origin: United States
- Original language: English

Production
- Producers: Susan Lacy; Jeff Rosen; Martin Scorsese; Nigel Sinclair; Anthony Wall
- Cinematography: Mustapha Barat
- Editor: David Tedeschi
- Running time: 208 minutes

Original release
- Release: September 27, 2005

No Direction Home: Bob Dylan is a 2005 documentary film directed by Martin Scorsese that traces the life of Bob Dylan, and his impact on 20th-century American popular music and culture. The film focuses on the period between Dylan's arrival in New York in January 1961 and his "retirement" from touring following his motorcycle accident in July 1966. This period encapsulates Dylan's rise to fame as a folk singer and songwriter where he became the center of a cultural and musical upheaval, and continues through the electric controversy surrounding his move to a rock style of music.

The title of the film is taken from the lyrics of Dylan's 1965 single "Like a Rolling Stone".

== Production and content ==
The film was first broadcast on television in both the United States (as part of the American Masters series on PBS) and the United Kingdom (as part of the Arena series on BBC Two) on September 26–27, 2005. A DVD version of the film and accompanying soundtrack album (The Bootleg Series Vol. 7: No Direction Home: The Soundtrack) were released that same month.

The project began to take shape in 1995 when Dylan's manager, Jeff Rosen, began scheduling interviews with Dylan's friends and associates. Among those interviewed were poet Allen Ginsberg and folk musician Dave Van Ronk, both of whom died before the film was completed. Dylan's old girlfriend Suze Rotolo also granted a rare interview, and she later told Rolling Stone that she was very pleased with the project's results. Dylan himself also sat for ten hours in a relaxed and open conversation with Rosen in 2000. Other interviews with those who knew him at the time include Joan Baez, Pete Seeger, Liam Clancy, Maria Muldaur, Peter Yarrow, John Cohen, singer Mavis Staples, artist Bob Neuwirth, guitarist/organist Al Kooper, promoters such as Harold Leventhal and Tom Nelson, record industry A&R reps, promoters and executives Izzy Young, Mitch Miller, John Hammond, Artie Mogul, and filmmaker D. A. Pennebaker.

According to Rolling Stone, an unnamed source close to the project claimed that Dylan had no involvement with the project apart from the interview, saying that "[Dylan] has no interest in this . . . Bob truly does not look back." However, work on the first installment of Dylan's autobiography, Chronicles: Volume One, did overlap production of the project, though it is unclear how much, if any, influence Chronicles may have had on No Direction Home.

Though raw material was being gathered for the project, Rosen needed someone to edit and shape it into a quality motion picture, and celebrated filmmaker Martin Scorsese was approached to direct the documentary planned from the project. Scorsese eventually agreed and came aboard in 2001.

In the meantime, Dylan's offices gathered hundreds of hours of historical film footage dating from the time covered in No Direction Home. These included a scratchy recording of Dylan's high school rock band, his 1965 screen test for Andy Warhol, and newly discovered footage of the famous Manchester Free Trade Hall concert from May 17, 1966, when an angry fan called out "Judas!" just before Dylan and the Hawks performed "Like a Rolling Stone". Shot by D. A. Pennebaker, the onstage color footage was found in 2004 in a pile of water-damaged film recovered from Dylan's vault.

The cover photo on the DVD package, by Barry Feinstein, shows Dylan standing in front of the Aust Ferry terminal in Gloucestershire, England, in May 1966, shortly before the opening of the Severn Bridge which replaced the ferry.

== Critical reception ==
The film received positive reviews from film critics, as review aggregate website Rotten Tomatoes reported that 88% of critics gave the film positive reviews, based on 14 reviews.

Roger Ebert of the Chicago Sun-Times gave the film four out of a possible four stars, stating that it "creates a portrait that is deep, sympathetic, perceptive and yet finally leaves Dylan shrouded in mystery, which is where he properly lives".

In The Guardian, Sam Wollaston wrote: "It's wonderful, a remarkable knitting together of a lot of tangled strands into a thing of sense and beauty. Maybe it will help to convert the unconvinced. Dylanites meanwhile will treasure it, while singing along."

On December 19, 2024, Screen Rant released an article describing the documentary as, "Dylan’s unmatched place in 20th-century American popular music into perspective [that’s] digestible to a newcomer." The article later added that the film "painted a vivid portrait of the artist while still maintaining his mysterious appeal."

== Accolades ==
The film received a Peabody Award in April 2006 and a Columbia-duPont Award in January 2007, and Martin Scorsese received a Grammy Award in direction for best long-form video.

== Legacy ==
The documentary, describing the 1960 New York folk scene, served as an inspiration to Justin Timberlake for his part in the Coen brothers' related drama Inside Llewyn Davis (2013).

Scorsese would make a second documentary on Dylan fourteen years later, Rolling Thunder Revue: A Bob Dylan Story by Martin Scorsese (2019), this time chronicling his 1975 Rolling Thunder Revue concert tour.

== Soundtrack ==
=== Part I ===
- Bob Dylan (live) – "Like a Rolling Stone"
- Gene Vincent and the Blue Caps
- Hank Williams
- Muddy Waters
- Bob Dylan – "Tambourine Man"
- Bobby Vee
- John Jacob Niles
- Odetta
- The Clancy Brothers
- Woody Guthrie – John Henry's Hammer
- Woody Guthrie – "They Laid Jesus Christ in His Grave"
- Bob Dylan (live) – "Leopard-Skin Pill-Box Hat"
- Joan Baez – "What You Gonna Call Your Pretty Little Baby"
- Ken Jacobs – "Star Spangled Death"
- Maria Muldaur
- New Lost City Ramblers
- Bob Dylan – "Desolation Row"
- Brother John Sellers
- Peter La Farge
- Cisco Houston
- Dave Van Ronk
- Liam Clancy
- Bob Dylan (cover) – "Man of Constant Sorrow"
- Bob Dylan – "Song to Woody"
- Johnny Mathis
- Harry Belafonte
- Bob Dylan (cover) – "Baby, Let Me Follow You Down" by Erich Von Schmidt
- Bob Dylan (cover) – "House of the Rising Sun"
- Pete Seeger
- Bob Dylan – "Let Me Die in My Footsteps"
- Bob Dylan – "Blowin' in the Wind"
- Bob Dylan – "Don't Think Twice, It's All Right"
- Bob Dylan – "A Hard Rain's a-Gonna Fall"
- Bob Dylan – "Ballad of a Thin Man"
- Bob Dylan – "Masters of War"
- Bob Dylan – "Oxford Town"
- Florence Reece – "Which Side Are You On?"
- Leadbelly - "Goodnight, Irene"
- The Weavers – "Goodnight, Irene"
- Pete Seeger – "If I Had a Hammer"
- Bob Dylan – "With God on Our Side"
- Bob Dylan – "When the Ship Comes In"
- Johnny Cash – "I Walk the Line"
- Howlin' Wolf
- Bob Dylan – "Only a Pawn in Their Game"
- Joan Baez & Bob Dylan (duet) – "With God on Our Side"
- Joan Baez (cover) – "With God on Our Side" by Bob Dylan
- Bob Dylan (from Dont Look Back) – "Subterranean Homesick Blues"

=== Part II ===
- Bob Dylan (live in London) – "Just Like Tom Thumb's Blues"
- Peter, Paul and Mary (cover) – "Blowin' in the Wind" by Bob Dylan
- Bob Dylan and Joan Baez (live at the March on Washington) – "When the Ship Comes In"
- Bob Dylan – "A Hard Rain's a-Gonna Fall"
- Bob Dylan – "Chimes of Freedom Flashing"
- Bob Dylan (Newport 1964) – "All I Really Want to Do"
- Johnny Cash (cover) – "Don't Think Twice, It's All Right" by Bob Dylan
- Bob Dylan (Newport 1964) – "Mr. Tambourine Man"
- Bob Dylan – "It's Alright, Ma (I'm Only Bleeding)"
- Bob Dylan – "Gates of Eden"
- Bob Dylan and Joan Baez (duet) – "It Ain't Me Babe"
- Joan Baez (cover) – "With God on Our Side" by Bob Dylan
- Bob Dylan (from documentary Dont Look Back) – "Subterranean Homesick Blues"
- Bob Dylan – "Ain't Gonna Work on Maggie's Farm"
- Bob Dylan – "Bob Dylan's 115th Dream"
- Bob Dylan – "Love Minus Zero/No Limit"
- Joan Baez (live backstage) – "Percy's Song"
- Joan Baez (live for the interviewer with acoustic guitar) – "Love Is Just a Four-Letter Word"
- Bob Dylan (studio version with Al Kooper on organ) – "Like a Rolling Stone"
- Peter Paul & Mary
- Bob Dylan (Live at Newport 1965, electric with the Bloomfield Blues Band) – "Maggie's Farm"
- Bob Dylan (Live at Newport 1965, electric with the Bloomfield Blues Band) – "Like a Rolling Stone"
- Bob Dylan (Acoustic encore – Live at Newport 1965) – "It's All Over Now, Baby Blue"
- Bob Dylan – "Highway 61 Revisited"
- Bob Dylan – "Ballad of a Thin Man"
- Bob Dylan – "Desolation Row"
- Bob Dylan – "It Takes a Lot to Laugh, It Takes a Train to Cry"
- Bob Dylan and the Band (live in London) – "Just Like Tom Thumb's Blues"
- Bob Dylan and the Band (live in London) – "Tell Me, Momma"
- Johnny Cash and Bob Dylan (backstage cover) – "Whiporwhill (So Lonesome I Could Cry)" by Hank Williams
- Bob Dylan – "Visions of Johanna"
- Bob Dylan (live) – "Like a Rolling Stone"
