= Eric Von Schmidt =

American musician and artist

Eric von Schmidt

Background information
- Born: May 28, 1931; Bridgeport, Connecticut, U.S.
- Died: February 2, 2007 (aged 75) Fairfield, Connecticut, U.S.
- Genres: Folk; blues
- Occupations: Musician; painter
- Instruments: Guitar; vocals
- Years active: 1950s–2007
- Labels: Folkways; Folklore; Prestige; Transatlantic; Smash; Poppy; Philo; Gazell; Tomato

Eric von Schmidt (May 28, 1931 – February 2, 2007) was an American folk musician and painter. He was associated with the folk boom of the late 1950s and early 1960s and was a key part of the Cambridge folk music scene. As a singer and guitarist, he was considered to be the leading specialist in country blues in Cambridge at the time, the counterpart of Greenwich Village's Dave Van Ronk. Von Schmidt co-authored with Jim Rooney Baby, Let Me Follow You Down: The Illustrated Story of the Cambridge Folk Years.

== Biography ==
Von Schmidt's father, Harold von Schmidt, was a Western painter who did illustrations for the Saturday Evening Post. Von Schmidt began selling his own artwork while he was still a teenager. Following a stint in the army, he won a Fulbright scholarship to study art in Florence. He moved to Cambridge, Massachusetts, in 1957, where he painted and became part of the coffeehouse scene.

Von Schmidt shared his large repertory of traditional music, passing them along to new performers who were developing a more modern version of folk music. He influenced Tom Rush, with whom he revived and arranged the traditional song "Wasn’t That a Mighty Storm?" about the 1900 hurricane that destroyed Galveston, Texas. When he met Bob Dylan, the two traded harmonica licks, drank red wine and played croquet. Dylan eagerly absorbed von Schmidt's voluminous knowledge of music, including folk, country and the blues. "I sang [Dylan] a bunch of songs, and, with that spongelike mind of his, he remembered almost all of them when he got back to New York," von Schmidt said in The Boston Globe.

Von Schmidt is widely (and erroneously) credited as the author of the song, "Baby, Let Me Follow You Down", which was for years a staple of Dylan's musical catalogue. In a spoken introduction to the song on his 1962 self-titled debut album, Dylan jokingly mentioned that he first "heard" the song from "Rick von Schmidt" and told of meeting him "in the green pastures of Harvard University." In fact, von Schmidt had adapted the song from Blind Boy Fuller and credited Reverend Gary Davis as author of "three-quarters" of the song. His 1979 book about the Cambridge scene is titled after the song.

Among his best known and performed original compositions is the song "Joshua Gone Barbados" which depicts Ebenezer Joshua the head of labor union and head of the government of Saint Vincent (island) vacationing during a time of labor strife leading indirectly to the deaths of three men. The accuracy of von Schmidt's characterization of Joshua's involvement in the incident has been disputed. Given that Mr. Joshua died poor and remains a revered figure on the island, his depiction in the song is probably less sympathetic than it should be. Nonetheless, the song remains a powerful evocation of the plight of the poor people of Saint Vincent.

In 1963, von Schmidt and Richard Fariña recorded in London's Dobell's Jazz Record store, with Dylan on harmonica. Two years later, The Folk Blues of Eric von Schmidt appeared atop a pile of records on the cover of Dylan's album Bringing It All Back Home.

In May 1964, Dylan visited von Schmidt at his home in Sarasota, Florida and recorded several songs there, including an early version of "Mr. Tambourine Man". The recordings were released in 2014 as part of Dylan's "50th Anniversary Collection 1964".

In the liner notes for von Schmidt's 1969 Smash album, Who Knocked The Brains Out Of The Sky? (SRS 67124), notes which also appeared on a cover sticker for von Schmidt's 1972 Poppy album 2nd Right 3rd Row, Dylan wrote:

Of course we had heard about Eric von Schmidt for many years. The name itself had become a password. Eventually, after standing in line to meet him, there it was – his doorstep, a rainy day, and he greeted his visitors, inviting them in. He was told how much they liked Grizzly Bear [a von Schmidt song] and he then invited the whole bunch to the club, where he was about to perform the thing live. "C'mon down to the club" he said – "I'm about to perform it live." We accepted the invitation. And that is what his record is. An invitation. An invitation to the glad, mad, sad, biting, exciting, frightening, crabby, happy, enlightening, hugging, chugging world of Eric von Schmidt. For here is a man who can sing the bird off the wire and the rubber off the tire. He can separate the men from the boys and the note from the noise. The bridle from the saddle and the cow from the cattle. He can play the tune of the moon. The why of the sky and the commotion from the ocean. Yes he can.

== Artist ==
Von Schmidt had a parallel career as a painter, and created album covers for Joan Baez, Cisco Houston, John Renbourn, Reverend Gary Davis, the Blue Velvet Band, Jackie Washington Landron and for James Baldwin's readings. He also created the cover for The Blues Project compendium of white blues performers (Elektra EKL-264, 1964). von Schmidt illustrated a 1973 book of twenty-five ghost stories called The Haunting of America, by Jean Anderson. He also painted the starry backdrop for the 1990 Universal Pictures logo. In the final 30 years of his life, von Schmidt recorded only two records, and instead focused on his art career.

Four years before his death, von Schmidt painted his last epic of American history. The canvas' subject was of Lewis and Clark's Corps of Discovery honoring its bicentennial. He also continued work on his "Giants of the Blues" series of paintings.

Von Schmidt also illustrated numerous children's books including a number of collaborations with Sid Fleischman.

== Awards and legacy ==
Von Schmidt was known for an exuberant musical style that he liked to apply to American folk classics. "Eric's got that wild spirit, and he doesn't water the music down for polite society," Ramblin' Jack Elliott told The Boston Globe in 1996.

Von Schmidt's music has been recorded by Travis MacRae and Jeff Buckley. In 2000, the same year he was diagnosed with throat cancer, he was honored with the ASCAP Foundation Lifetime Achievement Award at an event fittingly held at Club Passim, his old stomping ground when it was named Club 47. The highlight of the event was a reunion of the Jim Kweskin Jug Band including Maria Muldaur, Geoff Muldaur, Fritz Richmond, and, for the first time in over twenty years, Jim Kweskin.

In 1997, he won a Grammy Award for his work on a compilation album entitled Anthology of American Folk Music, Vol. 1-3. He painted up until his death, and completed an epic mural of the Battle of the Alamo.

Von Schmidt was twice divorced and had two daughters. He suffered a stroke in August 2006, and died six months later, at the age of 75.

== Discography ==
=== Albums ===
Year	Title	Album details
1961	Rolf Cahn & Eric von Schmidt, Folkways Records, 1961	Rolf Cahn and Eric von Schmidt, both on guitar and vocals.
1963	Dick Fariña & Eric von Schmidt, Folklore Records, 1963.	Richard Fariña, dulcimer, harmonica and vocals; Eric von Schmidt, guitar and vocals; Ethan Signer, fiddle, mandolin and guitar; and Blind Boy Grunt (Bob Dylan), harmonica and backup vocals.: Recorded at Dobell's Jazz Record Shop, London, January 14–15, 1963.
1963	The Folk Blues of Eric von Schmidt, Prestige/Folklore, 1963	* Eric von Schmidt, guitar and vocals, with Geoff Muldaur, guitar; Robert L. Jones, guitar and vocals; and Fritz Richmond, washtub bass.
1965	Eric Sings von Schmidt, Prestige Records, 1965	* Eric von Schmidt, guitar and vocals, with Geoff Muldaur, guitar, and Mel Lyman, harmonica.
1969	Who Knocked the Brains Out of The Sky?, Smash Records, 1969	* Eric von Schmidt, guitar and vocals, with David Blue, guitar; James Burton, dobro; Mitch Greenhill and Louis Shelton, guitar; Make Lang, keyboards; Steve Lefever and Lyle Ritz, bass guitar; and Abe Mills and Earl Palmer, drums.
1972	2nd Right, 3rd Row, Poppy Records, 1972	* Eric von Schmidt, guitar, electric piano, kazoo and vocals, with Munc Blackburn, tenor sax; Paul Butterfield, harmonica; Amos Garrett, bass guitar, guitar, mandolin, trombone, bottleneck guitar and bird calls; Garth Hudson, organ; Ben Keith, dobro; Campo Malaqua, accordion; Geoff Muldaur, guitar; Billy Mundi and Greg Thomas, percussion; Harry "Butch" Reed, clarinet; and Jim Rooney, backup vocals.: Liner notes by Bob Dylan and Eric von Schmidt.; Cover art by Milton Glaser.
1977	Eric von Schmidt & the Cruel Family, Philo Records, 1977	* Eric von Schmidt, guitar and vocals, with a 10-member folk-rock band that included Geoff Muldaur.
1995	Baby Let Me Lay It On You, Gazell, 1995	* Eric von Schmidt, guitar and vocals with Chance Browne, guitar; Samuel Charters, tambourine and jug; and Paul Geremia, slide guitar.
1972	Living on the Trail, Poppy Records, 1972 (unreleased), and Tomato Music, 2002	* Eric von Schmidt, bass guitar, guitar and vocals, with Paul Butterfield, harmonica; Bobby Charles and Rick Danko, backup vocals; Jim Colegrove and Billy Rich, bass guitar; Amos Garrett, bass guitar, guitar, trombone, slide guitar, mandolin, backup vocals; Garth Hudson, pump organ; Geoff Muldaur, guitar and backup vocals; Maria Muldaur, bass drums and backup vocals Chris Parker, drums; and Jim Rooney, rhythm guitar and backup vocals.: Cover art by Milton Glaser.

=== Compilations ===
- Come for to Sing, Pathways of Sound, 1963
- The Blues Project, Elektra, 1964
- Folklore Jamboree, Prestige Records, 1964
- The Newport Folk Festival 1965, Vanguard Records, 1965
- Take a Trip with Me: Psychedelic Hits", Prestige Records, 197?
- Bleecker & McDougal: The Folk Scene of the 60s, Elektra, 1984
- Blues in the Bottle, Big Beat Records, 1988
- Troubadours of the Folk Era, Vol. 1, Rhino Records, 1992
- Blues with a Feeling (Newport Folk Festival Classics), Vanguard, 1993
- The Prestige/Folklore Years, Vol. 1, Prestige Records, 1995
- The Prestige/Folklore Years, Vol. 2, Prestige Records, 1995
- The Acoustic Highway Collection: The Road to Country Rock, EMI, 1996
- Blues in the Sun, Vol. 7 (Blues Blue, Blues White): The Bluesville Years, Prestige Records, 1996
- Blues with a Feeling, Part Two, Vanguard Records, 1997
- Washington Square Memoirs: The Great Urban Folk Boom (1950–1970), Rhino Records, 2001
- Evening at Greasy Spoon Diner, P-Vine Records, 2002
