= Baby, Let Me Follow You Down =

Song by Bob Dylan

from the album Bob Dylan
- Released: March 19, 1962
- Recorded: November 1961
- Genre: Folk
- Length: 2:37
- Label: Columbia
- Songwriters: Reverend Gary Davis; Dave van Ronk; Eric von Schmidt

"Baby, Let Me Follow You Down" is a traditional folk song popularised in the late 1950s by blues guitarist Eric Von Schmidt. The song is best known for its appearance on Bob Dylan's debut album Bob Dylan.

== Early years of the song ==
The song was first recorded as "Don't Tear My Clothes" in January 1935 by the State Street Boys, a group that included Big Bill Broonzy and Jazz Gillum. The next few years saw several more versions, including "Don't Tear My Clothes" by Washboard Sam in June 1936, "Baby Don't You Tear My Clothes" by the Harlem Hamfats in May 1937, "Let Your Linen Hang Low" by Rosetta Howard with the Harlem Hamfats in October 1937 and "Mama Let Me Lay It On You" by Blind Boy Fuller in April 1938.

The song was adapted by Eric Von Schmidt, a blues-guitarist and singer-songwriter of the folk revival in the late 1950s. Von Schmidt was a well-known face in the East Coast folk scene and was reasonably well-known across the United States. According to his chronicle of the Cambridge Folk era, also called "Baby, Let Me Follow You Down", Eric had first heard the song via the Blind Boy Fuller recording. Von Schmidt credits Reverend Gary Davis for writing "three quarters" of his version of the song (the melody is very similar to Davis's "Please Baby"). Dave Van Ronk's version became a feature in the coffee houses of Greenwich Village in the early 1960s.

== Dylan years ==
The song was later picked up by the young, up and coming folk singer Bob Dylan, who made it famous on his Columbia Records debut. As an introduction to the song on the album, Dylan pays homage to Schmidt, saying: "I first heard this from Ric von Schmidt. He lives in Cambridge/ Ric is a blues guitarplayer. I met him one day on/ The green pastures of the Harvard University."

The song became very popular amongst Dylan's following and was a regular feature of Dylan's song list. During his 1966 World Tour, Dylan electrified the song's sound, playing it on electric guitar with a five-piece electric band as backing. A decade later, he performed the song at the Band's Last Waltz concert, backed by the Band.

== Additional verses ==
An early version of the song contained two verses and a main chorus. Bob Dylan added another verse to the song which appeared regularly. The song has also been edited and changed over the last half a century.

== Dylan albums containing the song ==
- Bob Dylan, recorded in studio November 1961, issued 1962
- Biograph, from Bob Dylan, issued 1985
- The Bootleg Series Vol. 9: The Witmark Demos: 1962–1964, recorded in studio January 1964, issued 2010
- Live 1962-1966: Rare Performances From The Copyright Collections, recorded live May 11, 1966, issued 2018
- The Bootleg Series Vol. 4: Bob Dylan Live 1966, The "Royal Albert Hall" Concert, recorded live May 17, 1966, issued 1998
- The Real Royal Albert Hall 1966 Concert, recorded live May 26, 1966, issued 2016
- The 1966 Live Recordings, all 1966 live recordings, issued 2016
- The Last Waltz, live with the Band, recorded live November 1976, issued 1978
