= Ballad of a Thin Man =

- Cover of French single

Song by Bob Dylan

from the album Highway 61 Revisited
- Released: August 30, 1965
- Recorded: August 2, 1965
- Studio: Columbia, New York City
- Genre: Blues rock · electric blues
- Length: 5:58
- Label: Columbia
- Songwriter: Bob Dylan
- Producer: Bob Johnston

"Ballad of a Thin Man" is a song written and recorded by Bob Dylan, and released in 1965 on his sixth studio album, Highway 61 Revisited.

== Recording ==
Dylan recorded "Ballad of a Thin Man" in Studio A of Columbia Records in New York City, located at 799 Seventh Avenue, just north of West 52nd Street on August 2, 1965. Record producer Bob Johnston was in charge of the session, and the backing musicians were Mike Bloomfield on lead guitar, Bobby Gregg on drums, Harvey Brooks on bass, Al Kooper on organ, and Dylan himself playing piano. Driven by Dylan's sombre piano chords, which contrast with a horror movie organ part played by Al Kooper, this track was described by Kooper as "musically more sophisticated than anything else on the Highway 61 Revisited album."

Kooper has recalled that at the end of the session, when the musicians listened to the playback of the song, drummer Bobby Gregg said, "That is a nasty song, Bob." Kooper adds, "Dylan was the King of the Nasty Song at that time."

== Inspiration and interpretations ==
Dylan's song revolves around the mishaps of a Mr. Jones, who keeps blundering into strange situations, and the more questions he asks, the less the world makes sense to him. Critic Andy Gill called the song "one of Dylan's most unrelenting inquisitions, a furious, sneering, dressing-down of a hapless bourgeois intruder into the hipster world of freaks and weirdoes which Dylan now inhabited."

In August 1965, soon after recording the song, when questioned by Nora Ephron and Susan Edmiston about the identity of Mr. Jones, Dylan was deadpan: "He's a real person. You know him, but not by that name... I saw him come into the room one night and he looked like a camel. He proceeded to put his eyes in his pocket. I asked this guy who he was and he said, 'That's Mr. Jones.' Then I asked this cat, 'Doesn't he do anything but put his eyes in his pocket?' And he told me, 'He puts his nose on the ground.' It's all there, it's a true story." At a press conference in San Francisco in December 1965, Dylan supplied more information about Mr. Jones. Though he claimed he could not reveal Mr. Jones' first name because he would be sued, he said, "He's a pinboy. He also wears suspenders."

In March 1986, Dylan told his audience in Japan: "This is a song I wrote a while back in response to people who ask me questions all the time. You just get tired of that every once in a while. You just don't want to answer no more questions. I figure a person’s life speaks for itself, right? So, every once in a while you got to do this kind of thing, you got to put somebody in their place... So this is my response to something that happened over in England. I think it was about '63, '64. [sic] Anyway the song still holds up. Seems to be people around still like that. So I still sing it. It's called 'Ballad Of A Thin Man'."

There has been speculation whether Mr. Jones was based on a specific journalist. In 1975, reporter Jeffrey Jones "outed" himself in a Rolling Stone article, describing how he had attempted to interview Dylan at the 1965 Newport Folk Festival. When Dylan and his entourage later chanced on the hapless reporter in the hotel dining room, Dylan shouted mockingly, "Mr. Jones! Gettin' it all down, Mr. Jones?" When Bill Flanagan asked Dylan, in 1990, whether one reporter could claim all the credit for Mr. Jones, Dylan replied: "There were a lot of Mister Joneses at that time. Obviously there must have been a tremendous amount of them for me to write that particular song. It was like, 'Oh man, here's the thousandth Mister Jones'."

Dylan critic Mike Marqusee writes that "Ballad of a Thin Man" can be read as "one of the purest songs of protest ever sung", with its scathing take on "the media, its interest in and inability to comprehend [Dylan] and his music." For Marqusee, the song became the anthem of an in-group, "disgusted by the old, excited by the new... elated by their discovery of others who shared their feelings", with its central refrain "Something is happening here/ But you don't know what it is/ Do you, Mr. Jones?" epitomizing the hip exclusivity of the burgeoning counterculture. Dylan biographer Robert Shelton describes the song's central character, Mr. Jones, as "one of Dylan's greatest archetypes", characterizing him as "a Philistine, a person who does not see... superficially educated and well bred but not very smart about the things that count."

Critic Andy Gill refers to "a fascinating, albeit very idiotic and moronic, interpretation of the song as 'outing' a homosexual". Gill writes that this interpretation is based upon "the cumulative inference of references" to a series of images in the song: "pen in your hand", "hands you a bone", "contacts among the lumberjacks", "sword swallower", "he clicks his high heels", "he says, 'Here is your throat back, thanks for the loan'", "one-eyed midget" and "give me some milk". Gill is skeptical about this idea which he claims has appeared on internet sites devoted to Dylan's work, and writes that it "is probably more indicative of the pitfalls of interpretation than Dylan’s intention with the song"; he adds that the song "condemns the urge to interpret pruriently that which we don’t immediately understand."

== Legacy ==
- Huey P. Newton and others in the Black Panther Party admired the song, as well as Stokely Carmichael. Newton interpreted the lyrics as being about racism.
- In the John Lennon-penned Beatles song "Yer Blues", Lennon describes the character as feeling "suicidal, just like Dylan's Mr. Jones".
- Golden Earring covered the song on their album "Love Sweat".

== Releases ==
The song was originally released in 1965 on the album Highway 61 Revisited. An incomplete early take of the song, immediately preceding the master and featuring organ fills by Paul Griffin, was released on the 6-disc and 18-disc editions of The Bootleg Series Vol. 12: The Cutting Edge 1965–1966 in 2015.

Dylan has released live recordings of the song on Before the Flood (1974; recorded February 14, 1974), Bob Dylan at Budokan (1979; recorded March 1, 1978), Real Live (1984; recorded July 7, 1984), Hard to Handle (video, 1986; recorded February 24, 1986), The Bootleg Series Vol. 4: Bob Dylan Live 1966, The "Royal Albert Hall" Concert (1998; recorded May 17, 1966), The Bootleg Series Vol. 7: No Direction Home: The Soundtrack (2005; recorded May 20, 1966; also released in 2018 on Live 1962–1966: Rare Performances From The Copyright Collections), and The Bootleg Series Vol. 13: Trouble No More 1979–1981 (Deluxe Edition) (2017; recorded June 27, 1981). In 2016, all the 1966 live performances of the song were assembled on the box set The 1966 Live Recordings, with the May 26, 1966 performance released separately on the album The Real Royal Albert Hall 1966 Concert.

== Live performances ==
Dylan has performed the song live approximately 1278 times. The live debut occurred at Forest Hills Tennis Stadium on August 28, 1965 and the last performance (to date) took place at Darien Lake Amphitheater on September 17, 2024.

== Personnel ==
- Bob Dylan – vocals, piano
- Mike Bloomfield – lead guitar
- Al Kooper – organ
- Harvey Brooks – bass guitar
- Bobby Gregg – drums
