= The Original Mono Recordings =

Compilation album by Bob Dylan
- Released: October 19, 2010
- Recorded: November 20, 1961 – November 29, 1967
- Studios: Columbia Recording Studios, New York City and Nashville
- Genres: Folk rock; folk; blues
- Length: 6:23:45
- Labels: Columbia; Legacy
- Producers: Steve Berkowitz; John H. Hammond; Bob Johnston; Tom Wilson

Bob Dylan chronology
The Bootleg Series Vol. 9 – The Witmark Demos: 1962–1964 (2010)	The Original Mono Recordings (2010)	In Concert – Brandeis University 1963 (2011)

Professional ratings
Review scores
Source	Rating
Allmusic	4.5/5 stars
The Independent	5/5 stars
Classic Rock	10/10 stars
Entertainment Weekly	A−

The Original Mono Recordings is a box set compilation album of recordings by Bob Dylan, released in October 2010 on Legacy Recordings, catalogue 88697761042. It consists of Dylan's first eight studio albums in mono on nine compact discs, the album Blonde on Blonde being issued on two discs as in its original vinyl format. It does not include the singles collection Bob Dylan's Greatest Hits released during the same time span. The set includes a 56-page booklet with photographs, discographical information, and an essay by Greil Marcus. It peaked at No. 152 on the Billboard 200.

== Content ==
Mono was the playback medium for most record players, car radios, and transistor radios during the 1960s. Stereo playback systems had been available since the late 1950s, but the equipment and the albums mixed to play on them were expensive, and the music industry continued to manufacture mono albums and singles through the decade. Monophonic as a format would not be discontinued in both the United States and the United Kingdom until approximately 1969. As stated in the liner notes by Marcus,

This box collects Bob Dylan's first eight 12-inch LPs...as most people heard them, as they were expected to be heard, and as most often they were meant to be heard: in mono.

Moreover, the mixing of the album in mono was the chief priority of Dylan and his producers. Stereo was almost an afterthought. Producer Steve Berkowitz, who supervised the reissue of The Original Mono Recordings was told by Bob Johnston about the mixing of Blonde on Blonde: "We mixed that mono probably for three or four days, then I said, 'Oh shit, man, we gotta do stereo.' So me and a coupla guys put our hands on the board, we mixed that son of a bitch in about four hours!... So my point is, it took a long time to do the mono, and then it was, 'Oh, yeah, we gotta do stereo'."

A similar box set compiling LP mono records by The Beatles had been released in 2009 to respectable sales results, awarded a platinum record by the RIAA. This may have been impetus for Sony to issue this set.

Most of the albums were mastered from the original, first-generation master tapes. Only two albums were not: The Times They Are A-Changin' and Highway 61 Revisited. The original master tape for the former could not be found so a new master was mixed from the original three-track tape, using the original vinyl pressing as a guide. Highway 61 Revisited was mastered from a second-generation overseas copy of the mono mix.

The genuine mono mix for John Wesley Harding was presumably released only in the U.S., whereas the original mono LP issued in the UK was apparently a fold-down of the stereo master. For The Original Mono Recordings box set, the producers used the genuine mono mix issued in the U.S.

Initial purchase of the box allowed for free download of the non-album single "Positively Fourth Street" in mono, as well as the entire set in MP3. "Positively Fourth Street" was also included on the simultaneously released single-disc collection, The Best of the Original Mono Recordings.

The original recordings were produced by John Hammond, Tom Wilson, and Bob Johnston.

== Album listing ==
Bob Dylan (originally released March 19, 1962)
No.	Title	Writer(s)	Length
1.	"You're No Good"	Jesse Fuller	1:40
2.	"Talkin' New York"	Bob Dylan	3:20
3.	"In My Time of Dyin'"	trad. arr. Dylan	2:40
4.	"Man of Constant Sorrow"	trad. arr. Dylan	3:10
5.	"Fixin' to Die"	Bukka White	2:22
6.	"Pretty Peggy-O"	trad. arr. Dylan	3:23
7.	"Highway 51"	Curtis Jones	2:52
8.	"Gospel Plow"	trad. arr. Dylan	1:47
9.	"Baby, Let Me Follow You Down"	trad. arr. Eric von Schmidt	2:37
10.	"House of the Risin' Sun"	trad. arr. Dave Van Ronk	5:20
11.	"Freight Train Blues"	trad., Roy Acuff	2:18
12.	"Song to Woody"	Bob Dylan	2:42
13.	"See That My Grave Is Kept Clean"	Blind Lemon Jefferson	2:43
Total length:			36:54

All tracks are written by Bob Dylan, except where noted.

The Freewheelin' Bob Dylan (originally released May 27, 1963)
No.	Title	Length
1.	"Blowin' in the Wind"	2:48
2.	"Girl from the North Country"	3:22
3.	"Masters of War"	4:34
4.	"Down the Highway"	3:27
5.	"Bob Dylan's Blues"	2:23
6.	"A Hard Rain's a-Gonna Fall"	6:55
7.	"Don't Think Twice, It's All Right"	3:40
8.	"Bob Dylan's Dream"	5:03
9.	"Oxford Town"	1:50
10.	"Talkin' World War III Blues"	6:28
11.	"Corrina, Corrina" (Traditional)	2:44
12.	"Honey, Just Allow Me One More Chance" (Dylan, Henry Thomas)	2:01
13.	"I Shall Be Free"	4:49
Total length:		50:04

All tracks are written by Bob Dylan.

The Times They Are a-Changin' (originally released January 13, 1964)
No.	Title	Length
1.	"The Times They Are a-Changin'"	3:15
2.	"Ballad of Hollis Brown"	5:06
3.	"With God on Our Side"	7:08
4.	"One Too Many Mornings"	2:41
5.	"North Country Blues"	4:35
6.	"Only a Pawn in Their Game"	3:33
7.	"Boots of Spanish Leather"	4:40
8.	"When the Ship Comes In"	3:18
9.	"The Lonesome Death of Hattie Carroll"	5:48
10.	"Restless Farewell"	5:32
Total length:		45:36

All tracks are written by Bob Dylan.

Another Side of Bob Dylan (originally released August 8, 1964
No.	Title	Length
1.	"All I Really Want to Do"	4:04
2.	"Black Crow Blues"	3:14
3.	"Spanish Harlem Incident"	2:24
4.	"Chimes of Freedom"	7:10
5.	"I Shall Be Free No. 10"	4:47
6.	"To Ramona"	3:52
7.	"Motorpsycho Nitemare"	4:33
8.	"My Back Pages"	4:22
9.	"I Don't Believe You (She Acts Like We Never Have Met)"	4:22
10.	"Ballad in Plain D"	8:16
11.	"It Ain't Me Babe"	3:33
Total length:		50:37

All tracks are written by Bob Dylan.

Bringing It All Back Home (originally released March 22, 1965)
No.	Title	Length
1.	"Subterranean Homesick Blues"	2:21
2.	"She Belongs to Me"	2:47
3.	"Maggie's Farm"	3:54
4.	"Love Minus Zero/No Limit"	2:51
5.	"Outlaw Blues"	3:05
6.	"On the Road Again"	2:35
7.	"Bob Dylan's 115th Dream"	6:30
8.	"Mr. Tambourine Man"	5:30
9.	"Gates of Eden"	5:40
10.	"It's Alright, Ma (I'm Only Bleeding)"	7:29
11.	"It's All Over Now, Baby Blue"	4:12
Total length:		47:21

All tracks are written by Bob Dylan.

Highway 61 Revisited (originally released August 30, 1965)
No.	Title	Length
1.	"Like a Rolling Stone"	6:09
2.	"Tombstone Blues"	5:58
3.	"It Takes a Lot to Laugh, It Takes a Train to Cry"	4:09
4.	"From a Buick 6"	3:19
5.	"Ballad of a Thin Man"	5:58
6.	"Queen Jane Approximately"	5:31
7.	"Highway 61 Revisited"	3:30
8.	"Just Like Tom Thumb's Blues"	5:31
9.	"Desolation Row"	11:21
Total length:		51:26

All tracks are written by Bob Dylan.

Blonde on Blonde (originally released June 20, 1966)
No.	Title	Length
1.	"Rainy Day Women No. 12 & 35"	4:36
2.	"Pledging My Time"	3:50
3.	"Visions of Johanna"	7:33
4.	"One of Us Must Know (Sooner or Later)"	4:54
5.	"I Want You"	3:07
6.	"Stuck Inside of Mobile with the Memphis Blues Again"	7:05
7.	"Leopard-Skin Pill-Box Hat"	3:58
8.	"Just Like a Woman"	4:52
Total length:		39:55

Disc two
No.	Title	Length
1.	"Most Likely You Go Your Way and I'll Go Mine"	3:30
2.	"Temporary Like Achilles"	5:02
3.	"Absolutely Sweet Marie"	4:57
4.	"4th Time Around"	4:35
5.	"Obviously 5 Believers"	3:35
6.	"Sad Eyed Lady of the Lowlands"	11:23
Total length:		32:42 72:37

All tracks are written by Bob Dylan.

John Wesley Harding (originally released December 27, 1967)
No.	Title	Length
1.	"John Wesley Harding"	2:58
2.	"As I Went Out One Morning"	2:49
3.	"I Dreamed I Saw St. Augustine"	3:53
4.	"All Along the Watchtower"	2:31
5.	"The Ballad of Frankie Lee and Judas Priest"	5:35
6.	"Drifter's Escape"	2:52
7.	"Dear Landlord"	3:16
8.	"I Am a Lonesome Hobo"	3:21
9.	"I Pity the Poor Immigrant"	4:12
10.	"The Wicked Messenger"	2:02
11.	"Down Along the Cove"	2:23
12.	"I'll Be Your Baby Tonight"	2:34
Total length:		38:24

== Collective personnel ==
- Bob Dylan – vocals, guitar, harmonica, piano, keyboard, police car

Additional musicians

- Bill Aikins – keyboards (Blonde on Blonde)
- George Barnes – bass guitar (The Freewheelin' Bob Dylan)
- Mike Bloomfield – guitar (Highway 61 Revisited)
- John Boone – bass guitar (Bringing It All Back Home)
- Harvey Brooks – bass guitar (Highway 61 Revisited)
- Wayne Butler – trombone (Blonde on Blonde)
- Kenneth A. Buttrey – drums (Blonde on Blonde and John Wesley Harding)
- Howard Collins – guitar (The Freewheelin' Bob Dylan)
- Rick Danko or Bill Lee – bass guitar (Blonde on Blonde New York sessions)
- Pete Drake – pedal steel guitar (John Wesley Harding)
- Leonard Gaskin – bass guitar (The Freewheelin' Bob Dylan)
- Al Gorgoni – guitar (Bringing It All Back Home)
- Bobby Gregg – drums (Bringing It All Back Home, Highway 61 Revisited, and Blonde on Blonde New York sessions)
- Paul Griffin – piano, keyboards (Bringing It All Back Home); organ, piano (Highway 61 Revisited); piano (Blonde on Blonde New York sessions)
- John P. Hammond – guitar (Bringing It All Back Home)
- Jerry Kennedy – guitar (Blonde on Blonde)
- Al Kooper – organ, piano (Hohner pianet) (Highway 61 Revisited); organ, guitar (Blonde on Blonde)
- Bruce Langhorne – guitar (The Freewheelin' Bob Dylan and Bringing It All Back Home)
- Sam Lay – drums (Highway 61 Revisited)
- Bill Lee – bass guitar (Bringing It All Back Home)
- Herb Lovelle – drums (The Freewheelin' Bob Dylan)
- Joseph Macho Jr. – bass guitar (Bringing It All Back Home)
- Charlie McCoy – guitar (Highway 61 Revisited); bass guitar, guitar, harmonica, trumpet (Blonde on Blonde); bass guitar (John Wesley Harding)
- Wayne Moss – guitar, vocals (Blonde on Blonde)
- Frank Owens – piano (Bringing It All Back Home and Highway 61 Revisited)
- Gene Ramey – double bass (The Freewheelin' Bob Dylan)
- Kenny Rankin – guitar (Bringing It All Back Home)
- Hargus "Pig" Robbins – piano, keyboards (Blonde on Blonde)
- Robbie Robertson – guitar, vocals (Blonde on Blonde)
- Russ Savakus – bass guitar (Highway 61 Revisited)
- John B. Sebastian – bass guitar (Bringing It All Back Home)
- Henry Strzelecki – bass guitar (Blonde on Blonde)
- Joe South – bass guitar, guitar (Blonde on Blonde)
- Dick Wellstood – piano (The Freewheelin' Bob Dylan)

Technical personnel

- John Berg – cover photo (John Wesley Harding)
- Charlie Bragg – engineering (John Wesley Harding)
- John H. Hammond – production (Bob Dylan, The Freewheelin' Bob Dylan)
- Nat Hentoff – liner notes (The Freewheelin' Bob Dylan)
- Don Hunstein – album cover photographer (The Freewheelin' Bob Dylan)
- Bob Johnston – production (Highway 61 Revisited, Blonde on Blonde, John Wesley Harding)
- Daniel Kramer – photography (Bringing It All Back Home and Highway 61 Revisited)
- Jerry Schatzberg – cover photographer (Blonde on Blonde)
- Tom Wilson – production (The Freewheelin' Bob Dylan, The Times They Are a-Changin', Another Side of Bob Dylan, Bringing It All Back Home, and "Like a Rolling Stone" on Highway 61 Revisited)

== Chart positions ==
Chart (2013)	Peak position
Dutch Albums (Album Top 100)	100
German Albums (Offizielle Top 100)	58
Scottish Albums (Official Charts)	90
Swedish Albums (Sverigetopplistan)	42
US Billboard 200	152
US Top Rock Albums (Billboard)	47
US Americana/Folk Albums (Billboard)	7
