= Bob Dylan's Greatest Hits =

1967 compilation album by Bob Dylan

Greatest hits album by Bob Dylan
- Released: March 27, 1967
- Genres: Folk rock; folk
- Length: 40:05
- Label: Columbia
- Producers: John H. Hammond; Tom Wilson; Bob Johnston

Bob Dylan chronology
Blonde on Blonde (1966)	Bob Dylan's Greatest Hits (1967)	John Wesley Harding (1967)

Bob Dylan's Greatest Hits is a 1967 compilation album of songs by the American singer-songwriter Bob Dylan. Released on March 27, 1967, by Columbia Records, it was a stopgap between Dylan's studio albums Blonde on Blonde and John Wesley Harding, during which time he had retreated from the public eye to recover from a motorcycle accident.

It was Dylan's first compilation, containing every Top 40 single Dylan had up to 1967, plus additional album tracks which had become popular singles as recorded by other artists. It peaked at No. 10 on the pop album chart in the United States, and went to No. 3 on the album chart in the United Kingdom. Certified five times platinum by the RIAA, it is his best-selling album in the U.S.

== Content ==
Greatest Hits presented Dylan's first appearance on record after his praised Blonde on Blonde double-LP of May 1966 and his motorcycle accident of that summer. With no activity by Dylan since the end of his recent world tour, and no new recordings on the immediate horizon (the sessions that would in part be released in June 1975 as The Basement Tapes were still months away), Columbia wanted new product to continue to capitalize on Dylan's commercial appeal, so released Bob Dylan's Greatest Hits, the label's first Dylan compilation.

Greatest Hits serves as Dylan's de facto singles collection for the 1960s. With the exception of "The Times They Are a-Changin'", "It Ain't Me Babe", and "Mr. Tambourine Man", all tracks on this album were released as 45 rpm singles in the United States during that decade. Several of the non-single tracks had been hit cover versions for other groups; in 1963 "Blowin' in the Wind" became a No. 2 hit single for Peter, Paul and Mary, and in 1965 Dylan's original recording made it to No. 9 as a single release in the United Kingdom.

In summer 1965, The Byrds had a No. 1 hit with a truncated rock and roll version of "Mr. Tambourine Man", and the Turtles took a folk-rock version of "It Ain't Me Babe" to No. 8. "Just Like a Woman" had also been a No. 10 UK hit for Manfred Mann. The remaining six tracks all made the Billboard Top 40 in 1965 and 1966. "Positively 4th Street" was the only single of the collection not released on a long-playing album, having been recorded during the sessions for Highway 61 Revisited. Despite charting in both the US and UK, the 1965 standalone single "Can You Please Crawl Out Your Window?" was not included in the compilation.

When this album was remastered for its compact disc 1999 issue, a slightly longer alternative mix of "Positively 4th Street" was substituted for the original single version. In 2003, this album was released along with Dylan's two other greatest hits compilations in one four-disc boxed set, as Greatest Hits Volumes I–III.

An audiophile version of the album was released in August 2012, mastered by Steve Hoffman for the Audio Fidelity label as a 24-kt gold-plated CD. This disc is a limited edition of 5,000 individually numbered copies. Like the 1999 remaster, this CD contains a longer version of "Positively 4th Street."

Professional ratings
Review scores
Source	Rating
AllMusic	5/5 stars
The Encyclopedia of Popular Music	5/5 stars
Rolling Stone	4/5 stars

== Artwork ==
The cover photograph used on the cover of Bob Dylan's Greatest Hits was taken by Rowland Scherman at Dylan's November 28, 1965, concert in Washington, D.C. Bob Cato was the designer of the album cover, which won the 1967 Grammy award for "Best Album Cover, Photography". The original album package also included Milton Glaser's iconic "psychedelic" poster depicting Dylan. A similar image taken at the Concert for Bangladesh in 1971 was selected for Bob Dylan's Greatest Hits Vol. II, a compilation Dylan had much more control over. John Berg, senior art director at Columbia Records, recognized that a backlit image such as Scherman's would work because of Dylan's distinctive profile and hairstyle. It was his design, as well as Scherman's photo, that won the Grammy.

== Track listing ==
=== Original release ===
All tracks are written by Bob Dylan. Chart positions are from Billboard Hot 100. In most cases the LP featured album versions in place of singles if such were not identical to the single mixes.

Side one
No.	Title	Single release	Length
1.	"Rainy Day Women #12 & 35" (album Blonde on Blonde, June 1966)	single released March 1966; chart peak #2	4:37
2.	"Blowin' in the Wind" (album The Freewheelin' Bob Dylan, May 1963)	single released August 1963; did not chart	2:48
3.	"The Times They Are a-Changin'" (album The Times They Are A-Changin', Jan 1964)	UK-only single peaked at #9	3:17
4.	"It Ain't Me Babe" (album Another Side of Bob Dylan, Aug 1964)	not released by Dylan as a single	3:32
5.	"Like a Rolling Stone" (album Highway 61 Revisited, Aug 1965)	single released June 1965; chart peak #2	6:11
Total length:			20:25

Side two
No.	Title	Single release	Length
1.	"Mr. Tambourine Man" (album, Bringing It All Back Home, March 1965)	not released by Dylan as a single	5:26
2.	"Subterranean Homesick Blues" (album, Bringing It All Back Home, March 1965)	single released March 1965; chart peak #39	2:19
3.	"I Want You" (album Blonde on Blonde, June 1966)	single released June 1966; chart peak #20	3:08
4.	"Positively 4th Street" (non-album single)	single released September 1965; chart peak #7	3:54
5.	"Just Like a Woman" (album Blonde on Blonde, June 1966)	single released August 1966; chart peak #33	4:53
Total length:			19:40

=== United Kingdom and Ireland ===
The UK release of the album was issued with no apostrophe in the title and its last two words in a secondary colour, suggesting a short-titled "Greatest Hits" marketing intention. Its front cover comprised a studio photo of Dylan holding a book of Renaissance paintings, and the album itself had a slightly different track listing. "Positively 4th Street" was omitted, but "She Belongs to Me", "It's All Over Now, Baby Blue", and "One of Us Must Know (Sooner or Later)" were added.

Side one
No.	Title	Length
1.	"Blowin' in the Wind"	2:51
2.	"It Ain't Me Babe"	3:38
3.	"The Times They Are a-Changin'"	3:16
4.	"Mr. Tambourine Man"	5:31
5.	"She Belongs to Me"	2:50
6.	"It's All Over Now, Baby Blue"	4:12
Total length:		22:18

Side two
No.	Title	Length
1.	"Subterranean Homesick Blues"	2:22
2.	"One of Us Must Know (Sooner or Later)"	4:54
3.	"Like a Rolling Stone"	6:12
4.	"Just Like a Woman"	4:53
5.	"Rainy Day Women #12 & 35"	4:40
6.	"I Want You"	3:09
Total length:		26:10

=== Europe ===
Released as Bob Dylan's Greatest Hits, cover-subtitled "Nobody sings Dylan like Dylan" and with a front cover studio photo of Dylan that differed from the UK one, this version was compiled in 1966. Only half of its 12 songs were also on the U.S. release, and songs from Blonde on Blonde were omitted altogether.

Side one
No.	Title	Length
1.	"Blowin' in the Wind"	2:51
2.	"Don't Think Twice, It's All Right"	3:40
3.	"Queen Jane Approximately"	5:19
4.	"Maggie's Farm"	3:51
5.	"Mr. Tambourine Man"	5:31
6.	"Bob Dylan's Blues"	2:23
Total length:		23:35

Side two
No.	Title	Length
1.	"The Times They Are a-Changin'"	3:16
2.	"It Ain't Me Babe"	3:38
3.	"Subterranean Homesick Blues"	2:22
4.	"It's All Over Now, Baby Blue"	4:12
5.	"Like A Rolling Stone"	6:12
6.	"Highway 61 Revisited"	3:30
Total length:		23:10

=== UK & Europe follow-on (Greatest Hits 2) ===
In the UK and Europe, the album was quickly followed up by Bob Dylan's Greatest Hits 2 in 1967, which repeated the four Blonde on Blonde songs from the first UK Greatest Hits album and added three more (including "Absolutely Sweet Marie"), as well as five further pre-1966 album songs (including "Just Like Tom Thumb's Blues", "Gates of Eden" and "Chimes of Freedom"). This album was different from the later 1971 album that was called Bob Dylan's Greatest Hits Vol. II in the US and called More Bob Dylan Greatest Hits in the UK.

Bob Dylan's Greatest Hits 2

Side one
No.	Title	Length
1.	"I Want You"	3:09
2.	"One of Us Must Know (Sooner or Later)"	4:54
3.	"It Takes a Lot to Laugh, It Takes a Train to Cry"	3:25
4.	"Just Like Tom Thumb's Blues"	5:31
5.	"Masters of War"	4:34
6.	"Chimes of Freedom"	7:10
Total length:		28:43

Side two
No.	Title	Length
1.	"Just Like a Woman"	4:53
2.	"Obviously Five Believers"	3:36
3.	"Rainy Day Women #12 & 35"	4:40
4.	"Gates of Eden"	5:40
5.	"Leopard-Skin Pill-Box Hat"	3:58
6.	"Absolutely Sweet Marie"	4:57
Total length:		27:44

=== Further European & Australian follow-on (Greatest Hits Vol. III) ===
Later in 1967, yet another follow-up album was released exclusively in Europe and Australia entitled Bob Dylan's Greatest Hits Vol. III (not to be confused with the more widely distributed 1994 album with a similar title). This album is notable for the distinction of being Dylan's first European hits album to include "Positively 4th Street". The album also includes three songs that were later included on Bob Dylan's Greatest Hits Vol. II, augmented with various album tracks.

Bob Dylan's Greatest Hits Vol. III

Side one
No.	Title	Length
1.	"Positively 4th Street"	3:50
2.	"One Too Many Mornings"	2:38
3.	"Pledging My Time"	3:55
4.	"She Belongs to Me"	2:48
5.	"My Back Pages"	4:20
6.	"All I Really Want to Do"	4:02
Total length:		21:33

Side two
No.	Title	Length
1.	"House of the Risin' Sun"	5:13
2.	"Corrina, Corrina"	2:40
3.	"Man of Constant Sorrow"	3:01
4.	"I Shall Be Free"	4:45
5.	"Tombstone Blues"	5:53
6.	"4th Time Around"	4:40
Total length:		26:12

== Charts ==
=== Weekly charts ===
Chart (1967)	Peak position
Canada Top Albums/CDs (RPM)	7
Spanish Albums Chart	6
UK Albums (Official Charts)	6
US Billboard 200	10
Chart (1975)	Peak position
Norwegian Albums (VG-lista)	18
Chart (1999)	Peak position
Swedish Albums (Sverigetopplistan)	46
Chart (2016)	Peak position
Italian Albums (FIMI)	93

=== Year-end charts ===
Chart (1967)	Position
US Billboard 200	47
Chart (1968)	Position
US Billboard 200	96

== Certifications ==
Region	Certification	Certified units/sales
Canada (Music Canada)	2× Platinum	200,000^{^}
France (SNEP)	2× Gold	200,000^{*}
Netherlands (NVPI)	Platinum	100,000^{^}
United Kingdom (BPI)	2× Platinum	600,000^{‡}
United States (RIAA)	5× Platinum	5,000,000^{^}
^{*} Sales figures based on certification alone.^{^} Shipments figures based on certification alone.^{‡} Sales+streaming figures based on certification alone.
