= Obviously 5 Believers =

1966 song by Bob Dylan

- Danish picture sleeve

Single by Bob Dylan

from the album Blonde on Blonde
- A-side: "Just Like a Woman"
- Released: June 20, 1966
- Recorded: March 10, 1966
- Studio: Columbia Studio A, Nashville
- Genre: Blues
- Length: 3:36
- Label: Columbia
- Songwriter: Bob Dylan
- Producer: Bob Johnston

Audio
- "Obviously 5 Believers" on YouTube

"Obviously 5 Believers" (also known as "Obviously Five Believers") is a song by the American singer-songwriter Bob Dylan, which was released as the last track of side three of his double album Blonde on Blonde (1966), and was the B-side to the single release of "Just Like a Woman" for releases in America and some other countries. The song was written by Dylan and produced by Bob Johnston. It was recorded at Columbia Music Row Studios, in the early morning hours of a March 9–10, 1966 session. Four takes were recorded, although the first two were incomplete. It has been interpreted as a blues song about loneliness, with critics noting similarities in melody and structure to Memphis Minnie's "Chauffeur Blues". Dylan's vocals and the musicianship of the band on the track have both received critical acclaim, although the track has been regarded as insubstantial by some commentators.

In 2010, the song was included on The Original Mono Recordings. Take 3 was included on the deluxe edition of The Bootleg Series Vol. 12: The Cutting Edge 1965–1966 (2015), and all four takes were included on the Collector's Edition of that album. Dylan first performed "Obviously 5 Believers" live in concert in Palm Desert, California on May 15, 1995. In all, he has played the song in concert 40 times, most recently in 1997.

== Background and recording ==
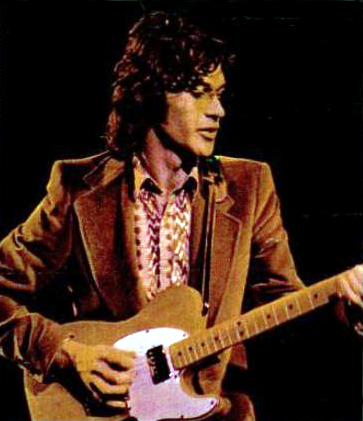
Robbie Robertson (pictured in 1971) found the Nashville musicians "clique-ish" but felt his performance on "Obviously 5 Believers" was "the track I did that got everyone to accept me".

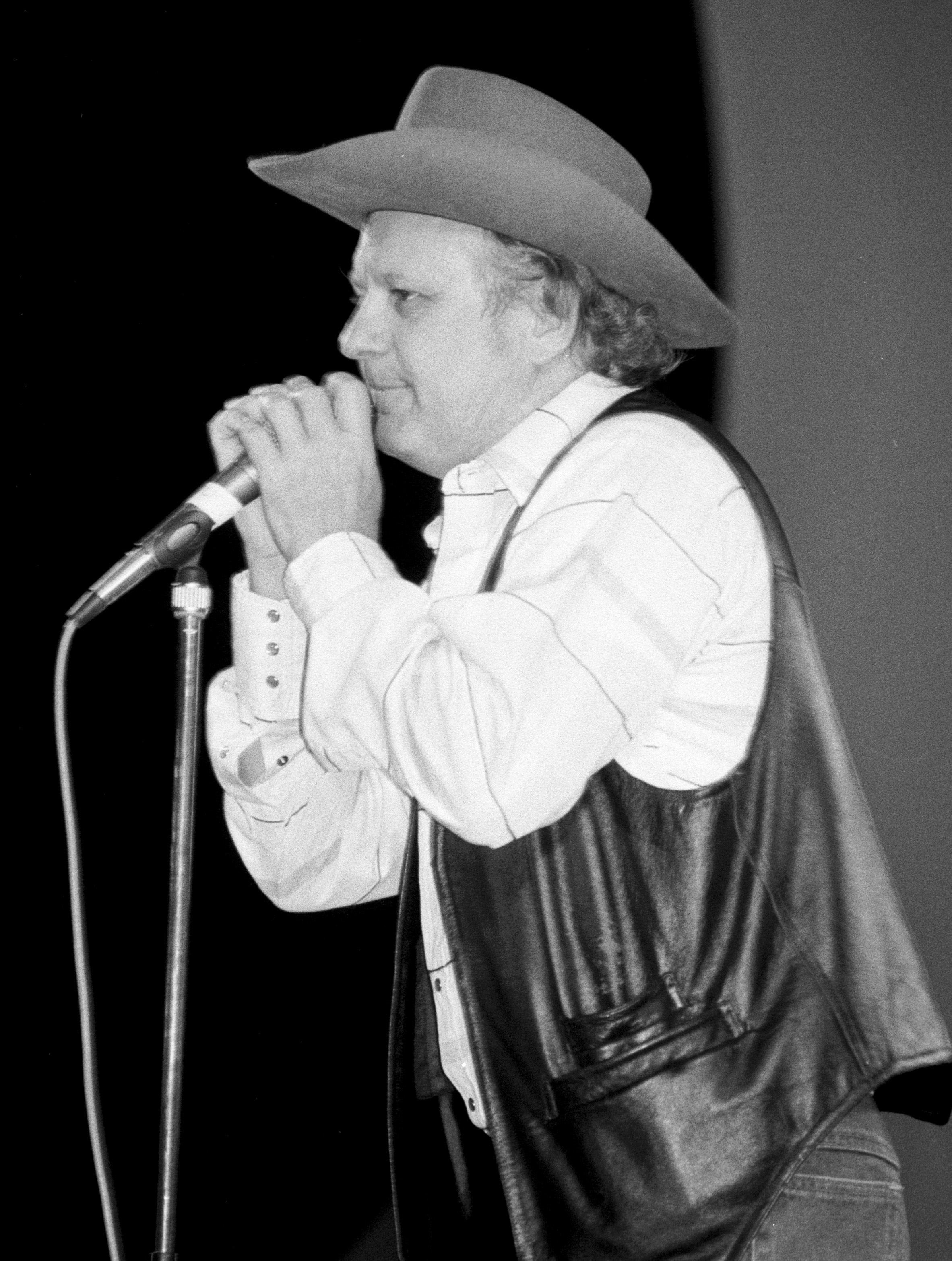
Charlie McCoy (pictured in 1990) rather than Dylan played harmonica on the track. McCoy said that "what [Dylan] wanted – the riff on it – is not what he does".

"Obviously 5 Believers"
Critic Andy Gill describes the song as steaming along like "a basic love moan".

In October 1965, Bob Dylan began recording sessions for his seventh studio album in New York. His sixth album, Highway 61 Revisited, had been released on August 30 of that year. The October sessions featured members of the Hawks, (later known as the Band), who Dylan had been touring with after his performance at the Newport Folk Festival in July. However, after several sessions, Dylan took his producer Bob Johnston's suggestion to relocate recording to Nashville. Two musicians from the New York sessions joined the Nashville recordings: Al Kooper, and Robbie Robertson of the Hawks. Johnston assembled leading session players to play on the recordings. Dylan had produced an outline version of "Obviously 5 Believers" by March 7.

"Obviously 5 Believers" was recorded in the early morning hours of the March 9–10, 1966, Nashville session under the working title "Black Dog Blues". Historian Sean Wilentz, author of Bob Dylan in America, feels that the song is driven by Robertson's guitar, Charlie McCoy's harmonica and Ken Buttrey's drumming. Dylan sang and played guitar, also accompanied by Kooper (organ), Wayne Moss (electric guitar), Hargus "Pig" Robbins (piano), and Henry Strzelecki (electric bass guitar). After an initial breakdown, Dylan complained to the band that the song was "very easy, man" and that he did not want to spend much time on it. Four takes were recorded. Take 4 was used as the fifth track on side three of Blonde on Blonde, It was the B-side to the single of "Just Like a Woman" for releases in America and some other countries. In 2010, it was included on The Original Mono Recordings. Take 3 was included on the deluxe edition of The Bootleg Series Vol. 12: The Cutting Edge 1965–1966 (2015), and all four takes were included on the Collector's Edition of that album.

== Composition and lyrical interpretation ==
Music historians Philippe Margotin and Jean-Michel Guesdon describe "Obviously 5 Believers" as "a bluesy love song about loneliness". They wrote that the song is similar in melody and structure to Memphis Minnie's "Chauffeur Blues", which was also an inspiration for '"Leopard-Skin Pill-Box Hat" on Blonde on Blonde. In 1995, author George White noted that the arrangement of "Obviously 5 Believers" has similarities to Bo Diddley's song "She's Fine, She's Mine", but critic Michael Gray suggests this is because both songs were indebted to earlier blues recordings. Journalist Mike Marqusee also thought that Dylan draws on blues idioms that predate his discovery of the genre in the mid-1950s, and notes that both "Obviously 5 Believers" and "Pledging My Time" from Blonde on Blonde have lyrics that start with the "ritual Delta [blues] invocation of 'early in the mornin''". Marqusee, however, felt that both of these Dylan compositions were "beyond category. They are allusive, repetitive, jaggedly abstract compositions that defy reduction." Other blues imagery used in the song includes a woman who has left, a black dog barking, and a mother who works hard. The song also has what Gill referred to as "apparently arbitrary references to 'fifteen jugglers' ... and the 'five believers'".

== Critical reception ==
The reviewer for Cash Box described "Obviously 5 Believers" as "a blues-soaked, rhythmic romancer". Writing in Crawdaddy!, Paul Williams called the song "joyous" and praised the instrumental and vocal performances. Clinton Heylin felt that every song Dylan recorded in Nashville for Blonde on Blonde relied on the skill of the backing musicians, but this song was "entirely dependent on them".

Jon Landau's assessment was that "the vocal here is truly the entire message and on this cut we are listening to a genuine blues artist". Guitarist Mike Bloomfield cited Dylan's performance on the song as evidence that he was a talented singer of the blues, unlike many other American and British artists of the time who would "just listen to records and imitate them". The song received an "A" rating from author John Nogowski, who highlighted Dylan's "assured, commanding vocals". The track was described by Robert Shelton as "pure honky-tonk" and among the best R&B numbers on the album, whereas Gray dismissed it as "a filler track ... with a repetitive and undistinguished lyric" that was more like a song from Dylan's Highway 61 Revisited than from Blonde on Blonde. Dylan biographer Ian Bell opined that Dylan's blues renditions on Blonde on Blonde "feel unsatisfactory and perfunctory, as though he knows he has better things to do, and far better things to write, and described "Obviously 5 Believers" as a "makeweight".

=== Influence and covers ===
The band Obviously 5 Believers, named after the song and taking inspiration from Dylan and the Rolling Stones, formed in Birmingham, England in 1979. Members included Stephen Duffy, a founder member of Duran Duran, and Dave Kusworth, later of Jacobites. Later renamed the Hawks, they released only one single before breaking up at the end of 1981, although a compilation of their recordings was released in 2021 as the album Obviously 5 Believers.

"Obviously 5 Believers" was often included in live sets by Top Jimmy & The Rhythm Pigs. A 1981 rendition was described by Don Waller as "the sonic equivalent of a bar fight". Chris Morris regarded the version included on the band's only album, Pigus Drunkus Maximus, recorded in 1981 but released in 1987, as one of the record's highlights. The Boston Phoenix reviewer Don Snowden praised it as one of the album's "sublime two-minute power shots". Old Crow Medicine Show performed all the songs from Blonde on Blonde live at a Country Music Hall of Fame and Museum event celebrating the 50th year of the album. The performance was released in 2017 as 50 Years of Blonde on Blonde. Their version of "Obviously 5 Believers", which featured a fiddle solo, was described as a "strutting blues jaunt" by Dan Hyman in Rolling Stone, and a "bluegrass breakdown" by the Knoxville News Sentinel reviewer Wayne Bledsoe.

== Live performances ==
Dylan did not play the song live until 1995, when he debuted it at the McCallum Theatre in Palm Desert, California on May 15. He played it live a further 39 times before retiring it after a performance at the Charles A. Dana Center, Waltham, Massachusetts on April 12, 1997.

== Personnel ==
Credits adapted from the That Thin, Wild Mercury Sound: Dylan, Nashville, and the Making of Blonde on Blonde book.

Musicians

- Bob Dylan – vocals, guitar
- Charlie McCoy – harmonica
- Robbie Robertson – electric guitar
- Wayne Moss – electric guitar
- Al Kooper – organ
- Hargus "Pig" Robbins – piano
- Henry Strzelecki – electric bass guitar
- Kenneth Buttrey – drums

Technical

- Bob Johnston – production
