= Blonde on Blonde =

1966 studio album by Bob Dylan

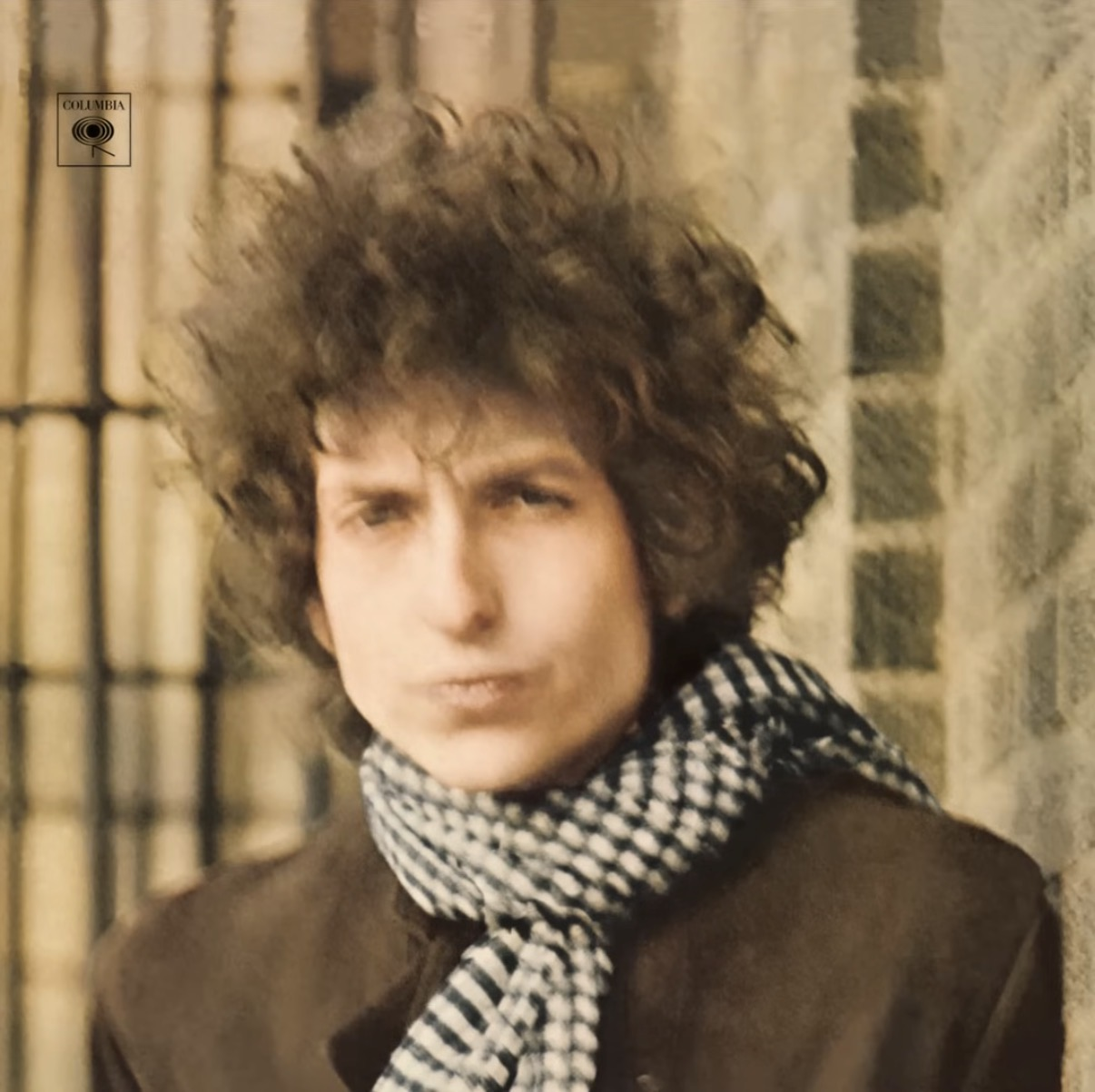

Studio album by Bob Dylan
- Released: June 20, 1966
- Recorded: January 25 – March 10, 1966 (Note: An overdub to "Fourth Time Around" was recorded in June 1966 (Heylin 2011, p. 264).)
- Studios: Columbia 7th Ave, New York City; Columbia, Nashville
- Genres: Folk rock; blues rock; country rock; rock and roll
- Length: 72:37
- Label: Columbia
- Producer: Bob Johnston

Bob Dylan chronology
Highway 61 Revisited (1965)	Blonde on Blonde (1966)	Bob Dylan's Greatest Hits (1967)

Bob Dylan studio album chronology
Highway 61 Revisited (1965)	Blonde on Blonde (1966)	John Wesley Harding (1967)

Singles from Blonde on Blonde
- 1. "One of Us Must Know (Sooner or Later)" Released: February 14, 1966; 2. "Rainy Day Women #12 & 35" / "Pledging My Time" Released: March 22, 1966; 3. "I Want You" Released: June 10, 1966; 4. "Just Like a Woman" / "Obviously 5 Believers" Released: August 18, 1966; 5. "Leopard-Skin Pill-Box Hat" / "Most Likely You Go Your Way and I'll Go Mine" Released: April 24, 1967

Blonde on Blonde is the seventh studio album by the American singer-songwriter Bob Dylan, released as a double album on June 20, 1966, by Columbia Records. Recording sessions began in New York in October 1965 with numerous backing musicians, including members of Dylan's live backing band, the Hawks. Though sessions continued until January 1966, they yielded only one track that made it onto the final album—"One of Us Must Know (Sooner or Later)". At producer Bob Johnston's suggestion, Dylan, keyboardist Al Kooper, and guitarist Robbie Robertson moved to the CBS studios in Nashville, Tennessee. These sessions, augmented by some of Nashville's top session musicians, were more fruitful, and in February and March all the remaining songs for the album were recorded.

Blonde on Blonde completed a trilogy of Dylan rock albums that began with 1965's Bringing It All Back Home and Highway 61 Revisited. Critics often rank Blonde on Blonde as one of the greatest albums of all time. Combining the expertise of Nashville session musicians with a modernist literary sensibility, the album's songs have been described as operating on a grand scale musically, while featuring lyrics one critic called "a unique mixture of the visionary and the colloquial". It was one of the first double albums in rock music.

The album peaked at number nine on the Billboard Top LPs chart in the US, where it eventually was certified double platinum, and it reached number three in the UK. Blonde on Blonde spawned two singles that were top-twenty hits in the US: "Rainy Day Women #12 & 35" and "I Want You". Two additional songs—"Just Like a Woman" and "Visions of Johanna"—have been named as among Dylan's greatest compositions and were featured in Rolling Stone's "The 500 Greatest Songs of All Time" list in 2004. In 1999, the album was inducted into the Grammy Hall of Fame, and was ranked number 38 in Rolling Stone's list of the "500 Greatest Albums of All Time" in 2020.

== Background ==
After the release of Highway 61 Revisited in August 1965, Dylan set about hiring a touring band. Guitarist Mike Bloomfield and keyboard player Al Kooper had backed Dylan on the album and at Dylan's controversial electric debut at the 1965 Newport Folk Festival. However, Bloomfield chose not to tour with Dylan, preferring to remain with the Paul Butterfield Blues Band. After backing him at concerts in late August and early September, Kooper informed Dylan he did not wish to continue touring with him. Dylan's manager, Albert Grossman, was in the process of setting up a grueling concert schedule that would keep Dylan on the road for the next nine months, touring the U.S., Australia, and Europe. Dylan contacted a group who were performing as Levon and the Hawks, consisting of Levon Helm from Arkansas and four Canadian musicians: Robbie Robertson, Rick Danko, Richard Manuel and Garth Hudson. They had come together as a band in Canada, backing American rocker Ronnie Hawkins. Two people had strongly recommended the Hawks to Dylan: Mary Martin, the executive secretary of Grossman, and blues singer John Hammond Jr., son of record producer John Hammond, who had signed Dylan to Columbia Records in 1961; the Hawks had backed the younger Hammond on his 1965 album So Many Roads.

Bob Dylan rehearsed with the Hawks in Toronto on September 15, where they were playing a hometown residency at Friar's Club, and on September 24, they made their debut in Austin, Texas. Two weeks later, encouraged by the success of their Texas performance, Dylan took the Hawks into Studio A of Columbia Records in New York City. Their immediate task was to record a hit single as the follow-up to "Positively 4th Street", but Dylan was already shaping his next album, the third one that year backed by rock musicians.

== Recording ==
=== New York sessions ===
Producer Bob Johnston, who had overseen the recording of Highway 61 Revisited, started work with Dylan and the Hawks at Columbia Studio A, 799 Seventh Avenue, New York, on October 5. They concentrated on a new arrangement of "Can You Please Crawl Out Your Window?", a song recorded during the Highway 61 Revisited sessions but not included on that album. Three further numbers were attempted, but none progressed into completed songs. Both the fragmentary "Jet Pilot" and "I Wanna Be Your Lover", a quasi-parody of the Beatles' "I Wanna Be Your Man", finally appeared on the 1985 box set retrospective, Biograph. Also attempted were two takes of "Medicine Sunday", a song that later evolved into "Temporary Like Achilles".

On November 30, the Hawks joined Dylan again at Studio A, but drummer Bobby Gregg replaced Levon Helm, who had tired of playing in a backing band and quit. They began work on a new composition, "Freeze Out", which was later retitled "Visions of Johanna", but Dylan was not satisfied with the results. One of the November 30 recordings was eventually released on The Bootleg Series Vol. 7: No Direction Home: The Soundtrack in 2005. At this session, they completed "Can You Please Crawl Out Your Window?" The song was released as a single in December, but only reached number 58 on the American charts.

Dylan spent most of December in California, performing a dozen concerts with his band, and then took a break through the third week in January following the birth of his son Jesse. On January 21, 1966, he returned to Columbia's Studio A to record another long composition, "She's Your Lover Now", accompanied by the Hawks (this time with Sandy Konikoff on drums). Despite nineteen takes, the session failed to yield any complete recordings. Dylan did not attempt the song again, but one of the outtakes from the January 21 session finally appeared 25 years later on The Bootleg Series Volumes 1–3 (Rare & Unreleased) 1961–1991. (Although the song breaks down at the start of the last verse, Columbia released it as the most complete take from the session.) Since 2015, this same outtake plus three other ones are available on The Bootleg Series Vol. 12: The Cutting Edge 1965–1966.

Around this time, Dylan became disillusioned about using the Hawks in the studio. He recorded more material at Studio A on January 25, backed by drummer Bobby Gregg, bassist Rick Danko (or Bill Lee), (Note: The booklet accompanying The Original Mono Recordings re-issue of Blonde on Blonde lists Will Lee as the bass player (Marcus 2010, p. 47). Wilentz insists that "the playing and talk on the session tape show conclusively that Rick Danko was the bassist on 'One of Us Must Know'" (Wilentz 2009, p. 113).) guitarist Robbie Robertson, pianist Paul Griffin, and organist Al Kooper. Two more new compositions were attempted: "Leopard-Skin Pill-Box Hat" and "One of Us Must Know (Sooner or Later)". Dylan was satisfied with "One of Us Must Know"; the January 25 take was released as a single a few weeks later and was subsequently selected for the album.

Another session took place on January 27, this time with Robertson, Danko, Kooper and Gregg. Dylan and his band recorded "Leopard-Skin Pill-Box Hat" and "One of Us Must Know (Sooner or Later)" again, but Dylan was not satisfied with the recorded performance of either song. Also at this session Dylan attempted a rough performance of "I'll Keep It with Mine", a song which he had already recorded twice as a demo. The musicians added some tentative backing in a rendering biographer Clinton Heylin described as "cursory". The recording was ultimately released on The Bootleg Series Volumes 1–3 in 1991.

A shortage of new material and the slow progress of the sessions contributed to Dylan's decision to cancel three additional recording dates. Six weeks later Dylan confided to critic Robert Shelton, "Oh, I was really down. I mean, in ten recording sessions, man, we didn't get one song ... It was the band. But you see, I didn't know that. I didn't want to think that".

=== Move to Nashville ===
Recognizing Dylan's dissatisfaction with the progress of the recordings, producer Bob Johnston suggested that they move the sessions to Nashville. Johnston lived there and had extensive experience working with Nashville session musicians. He recalled how Dylan's manager, Albert Grossman, was hostile to the idea: "Grossman came up to me and said 'If you ever mention Nashville to Dylan again, you're gone.' I said, 'What do you mean?' He said, 'You heard me. We got a thing going here'". Despite Grossman's opposition, Dylan agreed to Johnston's suggestion, and preparations were made to record the album at Columbia Studio A in Nashville's Music Row in February 1966.

In addition to Kooper and Robertson, who accompanied Dylan from New York, Johnston recruited harmonica player, guitarist and bassist Charlie McCoy, guitarist Wayne Moss, guitarist and bassist Joe South, and drummer Kenny Buttrey. At Dylan's request, Johnston removed the baffles—partitions separating the musicians so that there was "an ambience fit for an ensemble". Buttrey credited the distinctive sound of the album to Johnston's re-arrangement of the studio, "as if we were on a tight stage, as opposed to playing in a big hall where you're ninety miles apart". Dylan had a piano installed in his Nashville hotel room which Kooper would play to help Dylan write lyrics. Kooper would then teach the tunes to the musicians before Dylan arrived for the sessions.

On the first Nashville session, on February 14, Dylan successfully recorded "Visions of Johanna", which he had attempted several times in New York. Also recorded was a take of "4th Time Around" which made it onto the album and a take of "Leopard-Skin Pill-Box Hat" which did not.

On February 15 the session began at 6 p.m. but Dylan simply sat in the studio working on his lyrics while the musicians played cards, napped and chatted. Finally, at 4 am, Dylan called the musicians in and outlined the structure of the song. Dylan counted off and the musicians fell in, as he attempted his epic composition "Sad Eyed Lady of the Lowlands". Kenny Buttrey recalled, "If you notice that record, that thing after like the second chorus starts building and building like crazy, and everybody's just peaking it up 'cause we thought, Man, this is it ... This is gonna be the last chorus and we've gotta put everything into it we can. And he played another harmonica solo and went back down to another verse and the dynamics had to drop back down to a verse kind of feel ... After about ten minutes of this thing we're cracking up at each other, at what we were doing. I mean, we peaked five minutes ago. Where do we go from here?" The finished song clocked in at 11 minutes, 23 seconds, and would occupy the entire fourth side of the album.

The next session began similarly—Dylan spent the afternoon writing lyrics, and the session continued into the early hours of February 17, when the musicians began to record "Stuck Inside of Mobile with the Memphis Blues Again". After several musical revisions and false starts, the fourteenth take was the version selected for the album.

=== Nashville recording dates ===
Most accounts of recording Blonde on Blonde, including those by Clinton Heylin and Michael Gray, agree that there were two blocks of recording sessions: February 14–17 and March 8–10, 1966. This chronology is based on the logs and files kept by Columbia Records. (Note: The booklet accompanying The Original Mono Recordings re-issue of Blonde on Blonde gives recording dates for each track of the double album, confirming the Nashville recording sessions were in two blocks (Marcus 2010, pp. 48–49).)

Dylan and the Hawks performed concerts in Ottawa, Montreal, and Philadelphia in February and March, and then Dylan resumed recording in Nashville on March 8. On that date, Dylan and the musicians recorded the take of "Absolutely Sweet Marie" that Dylan selected for the album. Historian Sean Wilentz observed that "with the sound of 'Sweet Marie', Blonde on Blonde entered fully and sublimely into what is now considered classic rock and roll". The same day saw the successful takes of "Just Like a Woman", and "Pledging My Time", the latter "driven by Robertson's screaming guitar".

According to Wilentz the final recording session, on March 9–10, produced six songs in 13 hours of studio time. The first number to be recorded to Dylan's satisfaction was "Most Likely You Go Your Way and I'll Go Mine", when McCoy reinforced on trumpet a musical phrase Dylan played on his harmonica, changing the sound of the song radically. Dylan and his band then quickly recorded "Temporary Like Achilles". The session atmosphere began to "get giddy" around midnight when Dylan roughed out "Rainy Day Women #12 & 35" on the piano. Johnston recalled commenting; "That sounds like the damn Salvation Army band". Dylan replied; "Can you get one?" Johnston then telephoned trombonist Wayne Butler, the only additional musician required, and Dylan and the band, with McCoy again on trumpet, played a high-spirited version of the song.

In quick succession Dylan and the musicians then recorded "Obviously 5 Believers" and a final take of "Leopard-Skin Pill-Box Hat" powered by Robertson's lead guitar. The session concluded with "I Want You" on which, as Wilentz notes, "Wayne Moss's rapid-fire sixteenth notes on the guitar" are an impressive element of the recording.

Al Kooper, who played keyboards on every track of Blonde on Blonde, has contested the conventional account that there were two blocks of recording sessions in Nashville. In comments on Michael Gray's website, Kooper wrote: "There was only ONE trip to Nashville for Robbie and I, and ALL THE TRACKS were cut in that one visit", stating that Dylan merely broke for an outstanding concert. Charlie McCoy agreed with Kooper's version. Wilentz analyzed the recording of Blonde on Blonde in his book Bob Dylan in America, concluding that the "official" documented version fits Dylan's known touring schedule, and notes that five of the eight songs first recorded after "Stuck Inside of Mobile with the Memphis Blues Again", but none of those recorded earlier, include a middle-eight section—Dylan's first extensive foray as a writer into that conventional structure".

=== Mixing ===
Dylan mixed the album in Los Angeles in early April, before he departed on the Australian leg of his 1966 world tour. Wilentz writes that it was at this point it became "obvious that the riches of the Nashville sessions could not fit onto a single LP", and they had "produced enough solid material to demand an oddly configured double album, the first of its kind in contemporary popular music". According to producer Steve Berkowitz, who supervised the reissue of Dylan's LPs in mono as The Original Mono Recordings in 2010, Johnston told him that they carefully worked on the mono mix for about three or four days whereas the stereo mix was finished in about four hours. (Note: Johnston said: "We mixed that mono probably for three or four days, then I said, 'Oh shit, man, we gotta do stereo.' So me and a coupla guys put our hands on the board, we mixed that son of a bitch in about four hours! ... So my point is, it took a long time to do the mono, and then it was, 'Oh, yeah, we gotta do stereo'" (Ford 2010, p. 3).)

== Songs ==
=== Side one ===
==== "Rainy Day Women #12 & 35" ====
"Rainy Day Women #12 & 35"
Robert Shelton described the opening song on Blonde on Blonde as "Dylan at his most truculent—toying with the title, the raggle-taggle ensemble singing, the giggling, the manic instrumentation, and a variety of implied games about liquor or dope."

According to author Andy Gill, by starting his new album with what sounded like "a demented marching-band ... staffed by crazy people out of their mind on loco-weed", Dylan delivered his biggest shock yet for his former folkie fans. The elaborate puns on getting stoned combine a sense of paranoiac persecution with "nudge-nudge wink-wink bohemian hedonism". Heylin points out that the Old Testament connotations of getting stoned made the Salvation Army-style musical backing seem like a good joke. The enigmatic title came about, Heylin suggests, because Dylan knew a song called "Everybody Must Get Stoned" would be kept off the airwaves. Heylin links the title to the Book of Proverbs, chapter 27, verse 15: "A continual dropping in a very rainy day and a contentious woman are alike." Released as a single on March 22, 1966, "Rainy Day Women" reached number two on the Billboard singles chart and number seven in the UK.

==== "Pledging My Time" ====
Following the good-time fun of "Rainy Day Women #12 & 35", the Chicago blues-influenced "Pledging My Time" sets the album's somber tone. It draws on several traditional blues songs, including Elmore James's recording of "It Hurts Me Too". For critic Michael Gray, the lines "Somebody got lucky but it was an accident" echo the lines "Some joker got lucky, stole her back again" from Robert Johnson's "Come On in My Kitchen", which is itself an echo of Skip James's 1931 recording "Devil Got My Woman". Gray suggests that "the gulping movements of the melodic phrases" derive from the melody of "Sitting on Top of the World", recorded by the Mississippi Sheiks in 1930. The couplet at the end of each verse expresses the theme: a pledge made to a prospective lover in hopes she "will come through, too". Besides Dylan's vocals and improvised harmonica breaks, the song's sound is defined by Robbie Robertson's guitar, Hargus "Pig" Robbins' blues piano and Ken Buttrey's snare drum rolls. The song was released in edited form as the B-side of "Rainy Day Women #12 & 35" in March.

==== "Visions of Johanna" ====
"Visions of Johanna"
Wilfrid Mellers describes "Visions of Johanna" as one of Dylan's finest songs poetically. For Mellers, "The blurring of time and consciousness is marvelously realized ... when Johanna becomes a mythic femme fatale as well as a real woman, floating in and out of the 'museums where infinity goes up on trial'."

Considered by many critics one of Dylan's masterpieces, "Visions of Johanna" proved difficult to capture on tape. Heylin places the writing in the fall of 1965, when Dylan was living in the Hotel Chelsea with his wife Sara. In the New York recording studio, on November 30, Dylan announced his epic composition: "This is called 'Freeze Out'." Gill notes that this working title captures the "air of nocturnal suspension in which the verse tableaux are sketched ... full of whispering and muttering." Wilentz relates how Dylan guided his backing musicians through 14 takes, trying to sketch out how he wanted it played, saying at one point, "it's not hard rock, The only thing in it that's hard is Robbie." Wilentz notes that, as Dylan quiets things down, he inches closer to what will appear on the album.

Ten weeks later, "Visions of Johanna" fell into place quickly in the Nashville studio. Kooper recalled that he and Robertson had become adept at responding to Dylan's vocal and also singled out Joe South's contribution of "this throbbing ... rhythmically amazing bass part". Gill comments that the song begins by contrasting two lovers, the carnal Louise and "the more spiritual but unattainable" Johanna. Ultimately, for Gill, the song seeks to convey how the artist is compelled to keep striving to pursue some elusive vision of perfection. For Heylin, the triumph of the song is in "the way Dylan manages to write about the most inchoate feelings in such a vivid, immediate way."

==== "One of Us Must Know (Sooner or Later)" ====
When Dylan arrived at the studio on January 25, 1966, he had yet to work out the lyrics and title for what was to become the closing track on Blonde on Blonde's first side. With Dylan piecing together the song's sections, and the chorus that gives the song its title only emerging on take five, the session stretched through the night and into the next morning. Only on the 15th take was a full version recorded. Dylan and the band persisted until they recorded take 24, which closed the session and made it onto the album four months later. Critic Jonathan Singer credits Griffin's piano for binding the song together: "At the chorus, Griffin unleashes a symphony; hammering his way up and down the keyboard, half Gershwin, half gospel, all heart. The follow-up, a killer left hand figure that links the chorus to the verse, releases none of the song's tension."

"One of Us Must Know" is a straightforward account of a burned-out relationship. Dissecting what went wrong, the narrator takes a defensive attitude in a one-sided conversation with his former lover. As he presents his case in the opening verse, it appears he is incapable of acknowledging his part or limiting the abuse: "I didn't mean to treat you so bad. You don't have to take it so personal. I didn't mean to make you so sad. You just happened to be there, that's all." "One of Us Must Know" was the first recording completed for Blonde on Blonde and the only one selected from the New York sessions. The song was released as the first single from the album on February 14, the same day Dylan began to record in Nashville. It failed to appear on the American charts, but reached number 33 in the UK.

=== Side two ===
==== "I Want You" ====
Andy Gill notes that the song displays a tension between the very direct tone of the chorus, the repeated phrase "I want you", and a weird and complex cast of characters, "too numerous to inhabit the song's three minutes comfortably", including a guilty undertaker, a lonesome organ grinder, weeping fathers, mothers, sleeping saviors, the Queen of Spades, and the "dancing child with his Chinese suit". (Note: Gill reports that "the dancing child" was rumored to be a reference to Brian Jones of the Rolling Stones (Gill 2011, p. 142). Heylin agrees there may be substance to this because the dancing child claims that "time was on his side", perhaps a reference to "Time Is on My Side", the Rolling Stones' first US hit (Heylin 2009, p. 312).) Analyzing the lyrics' evolution through successive drafts, Wilentz writes that there are numerous failures, "about deputies asking him his name ... lines about fathers going down hugging one another and about their daughters putting him down because he isn't their brother". Finally Dylan arrives at the right formula.

Heylin points out that the "gorgeous" tune illustrates what Dylan explained to a reporter in 1966: "It's not just pretty words to a tune or putting tunes to words ... [It's] the words and the music [together]—I can hear the sound of what I want to say." Al Kooper has said that of all the songs that Dylan outlined to him in his hotel, this was his favorite, so Dylan delayed recording it to the very end of the Nashville sessions, "just to bug him". Released as a single on June 10, 1966, shortly before the album, "I Want You" reached number 20 in the US and number 16 in the UK.

==== "Stuck Inside of Mobile with the Memphis Blues Again" ====
Recorded at the third Nashville session, this song was the culmination of another epic of simultaneous writing and recording in the studio. Heylin calls this song 'a masterpiece of the first order'. Wilentz describes how the lyrics evolved through a surviving part-typed, part-handwritten manuscript page, "which begins 'honey but it's just too hard' (a line that had survived from the very first New York session with the Hawks). Then the words meander through random combinations and disconnected fragments and images ('people just get uglier'; 'banjo eyes'; 'he was carrying a 22 but it was only a single shot'), before, in Dylan's own hand, amid many crossings-out, there appears 'Oh MAMA you're here IN MOBILE ALABAMA with the Memphis blues again'."

Inside the studio, the song evolved through several musical revisions. Heylin writes, "It is the song's arrangement, and not its lyrics, that occupies the musicians through the wee small hours." On the fifth take, released in 2005 on the No Direction Home Soundtrack, midtake Dylan stumbles on the formula "Stuck inside of Mobile" on the fourth verse, and never goes back. The song contains two oft-quoted pieces of Dylan's philosophy: "Your debutante just knows what you need/ But I know what you want" and "here I sit so patiently/ Waiting to find out what price/ You have to pay to get out of/ Going through all these things twice".

==== "Leopard-Skin Pill-Box Hat" ====
"Leopard-Skin Pill-Box Hat" is a satire of materialism, fashion and faddism. Done in Chicago-blues style, the song derives its melody and part of its lyrics from Lightnin' Hopkins's "Automobile (Blues)". Paul Williams writes that its caustic attitude is "moderated slightly when one realizes that jealous pique is the underlying emotion". The narrator observes his former lover in various situations wearing her "brand new leopard-skin pill-box hat", at one point finding his doctor with her and later spying her making love with a new boyfriend because she "forgot to close the garage door". In the closing lines, the narrator says he knows what her boyfriend really loves her for—her hat.

The song evolved over the course of six takes in New York, 13 in the first Nashville session, and then one on March 10, the take used for the album. Dylan, who gets credit on the liner notes as lead guitarist, opens the song playing lead (on the center-right stereo channel), but Robertson handles the solos with a "searing" performance (on the left stereo channel). A year after the recording, "Leopard-Skin Pill-Box Hat" became the fifth single released from Blonde on Blonde, making it to number 81 on the Billboard Hot 100.

==== "Just Like a Woman" ====
According to Wilentz's analysis of the session's tapes, Dylan felt his way into the lyrics of one of his most popular songs, singing "disconnected lines and semi-gibberish" during the earlier takes. He was unsure what the person described in the song does that is just like a woman, rejecting "shakes", "wakes", and "makes mistakes". This exploration of female wiles and feminine vulnerability was widely rumored—"not least by her acquaintances among Andy Warhol's Factory retinue"—to be about Edie Sedgwick. The reference to Baby's penchant for "fog ... amphetamine and ... pearls" suggests Sedgwick or a similar debutante, according to Heylin.

Discussing the lyrics, literary critic Christopher Ricks detects a "note of social exclusion" in the line "I was hungry and it was your world". In response to the accusation that Dylan's depiction of female strategies is misogynistic, Ricks asks, "Could there ever be any challenging art about men and women where the accusation just didn't arise?" The song reached number 33 in the US.

=== Side three ===
==== "Most Likely You Go Your Way and I'll Go Mine" ====
A bright blues "stomper" about lovers parting, "Most Likely You Go Your Way And I'll Go Mine" is one of the more literal songs Dylan recorded in 1965–66. The narrator has tired of carrying his lover and is going to let her "pass". As in "Just Like a Woman" and "Absolutely Sweet Marie", he waits until the end of each verse to deliver the punch line, which in this case comes from the title. "Most Likely You Go Your Way" was issued as a single a year later, in March 1967, on the B-side of "Leopard-Skin Pill-Box Hat".

==== "Temporary Like Achilles" ====
This slow-moving blues number is highlighted by Hargus "Pig" Robbins's "dusky barrelhouse piano" and Dylan's "brief wheeze of harmonica". The narrator has been spurned by his lover, who has already taken up with her latest boyfriend. Calling his rival "Achilles", the narrator senses the new suitor may be discarded as quickly as he was. The refrain that ends each of the main verses—"Honey, why are you so hard?"—is a double entendre Dylan had been wanting to work into a song.

==== "Absolutely Sweet Marie" ====
This song, described as "up-tempo blues shuffle, pure Memphis" and an example of "obvious pop sensibility and compulsive melody", was recorded in four takes on March 7, 1966. Gill sees the lyrics as a series of sexual metaphors, including "beating on my trumpet" and keys to locked gates, many deriving from traditional blues. Nonetheless, the song contains what has been termed "one of the most oft-repeated of Dylan's life lessons", that "to live outside the law you must be honest", which was later invoked in many bohemian and countercultural contexts.

==== "4th Time Around" ====
When the Beatles released their sixth studio album, Rubber Soul, in December 1965, John Lennon's song "Norwegian Wood" attracted attention for the way Lennon disguised his account of an illicit affair in cryptic, Dylanesque language. Dylan sketched out a response to the song, also in 3/4 time, copying the tune and circular structure, but taking Lennon's tale in a darker direction. Wilentz describes the result as sounding "like Bob Dylan impersonating John Lennon impersonating Bob Dylan".

==== "Obviously 5 Believers" ====
"Obviously 5 Believers"
Critic Andy Gill describes this blues song as steaming along like "a basic love moan", except for its apparently arbitrary references to 15 jugglers and five believers. Heylin notes that every song Dylan recorded in Nashville relied on the caliber of the backing musicians, but this song was "entirely dependent on them."

"Obviously 5 Believers", Blonde on Blonde's second-to-last track, is a roadhouse blues love song similar in melody and structure to Memphis Minnie's "Chauffeur Blues", and was described by Robert Shelton as "the best R&B song on the album". Recorded in the early morning hours of the March 9–10 Nashville session under the working title "Black Dog Blues", the song is driven by Robertson's guitar, Charlie McCoy's harmonica and Ken Buttrey's drumming. After an initial breakdown, Dylan complained to the band that the song was "very easy, man" and that he did not want to spend much time on it. Within four takes, the recording was done.

=== Side four ===
==== "Sad Eyed Lady of the Lowlands" ====
Written in the CBS recording studio in Nashville over the space of eight hours on the night of February 15–16, "Sad Eyed Lady" eventually occupied all of side four of Blonde On Blonde. Critics have observed that "Lowlands" hints at "Lownds", and Dylan biographer Robert Shelton wrote that this was a "wedding song" for Sara Lownds, whom Dylan had married just three months earlier. (Note: Bob Dylan married Sara Lownds on November 22, 1965, at a judge's office on Long Island, New York. The only guests were Albert Grossman and a maid of honor for Sara; there was no publicity (Sounes 2001, p. 193).) In his paean to his wife, "Sara", written in 1975, Dylan sings that he stayed "up for days in the Chelsea Hotel/Writin' 'Sad-Eyed Lady of the Lowlands' for you".

When Dylan played Shelton the song, shortly after recording it, he claimed, "This is the best song I've ever written." Around the same time, Dylan enthused to journalist Jules Siegel, "Just listen to that! That's old-time religious carnival music!" But in 1969, Dylan told Rolling Stone editor Jann Wenner, "I just sat down at a table and started writing ... And I just got carried away with the whole thing ... I just started writing and I couldn't stop. After a period of time, I forgot what it was all about, and I started trying to get back to the beginning [laughs]."

Heard by some listeners as a hymn to an otherworldly woman, for Shelton "her travails seem beyond endurance, yet she radiates an inner strength, an ability to be reborn. This is Dylan at his most romantic." Wilentz comments that Dylan's writing had shifted from the days when he asked questions and supplied answers. Like the verses of William Blake's "The Tyger", Dylan asks a series of questions about the "Sad Eyed Lady" but never supplies any answers.

=== Outtakes and The Cutting Edge ===
The following outtakes were recorded during the Blonde on Blonde sessions.

Title	Status
"I'll Keep It with Mine"	Released on The Bootleg Series Volumes 1–3 (Rare & Unreleased) 1961–1991
"I Wanna Be Your Lover"	Released on Biograph
"Jet Pilot"	Released on Biograph
"Medicine Sunday"	Released on Highway 61 Interactive CD-ROM
"She's Your Lover Now"	Released on The Bootleg Series Volumes 1–3

In 2015, Dylan released Volume 12 of his Bootleg Series, The Cutting Edge, in three different formats. The 18-disc Collector's Edition was described as including "every note recorded during the 1965–1966 sessions, every alternate take and alternate lyric." The 18 CDs contain every take of every song recorded in the studio during the Blonde on Blonde sessions, from October 5, 1965, to March 10, 1966.

The New York sessions comprise: two takes of "Medicine Sunday", one take of "Jet Pilot", twelve takes of "Can You Please Crawl Out Your Window?", seven takes of "I Wanna Be Your Lover", fourteen takes of "Visions of Johanna", sixteen takes of "She's Your Lover Now", four takes of "Leopard-Skin Pill-Box Hat", twenty-four takes of "One of Us Must Know (Sooner or Later)", one take of "I'll Keep It with Mine", and one take of "Lunatic Princess".

The Nashville sessions comprise 20 takes of "Fourth Time Around", four of "Visions of Johanna", 14 of "Leopard-Skin Pill-Box Hat", four of "Sad-Eyed Lady of the Lowlands", 15 of "Stuck Inside of Mobile with the Memphis Blues Again", three of "Absolutely Sweet Marie", 18 of "Just Like a Woman", three of "Pledging My Time", six of "Most Likely You Go Your Way (And I'll Go Mine)", four of "Temporary Like Achilles", four of "Obviously Five Believers", five of "I Want You", and one of "Rainy Day Women #12 & 35". The 18 CDs also contain brief recordings of guitar and keyboard inserts.

Describing the process of listening to all these alternative versions, Neil McCormick wrote: "The Cutting Edge allows fans to bear witness to perhaps the most astonishing explosion of language and sound in rock history, a new approach to song being forged before our very ears."

== Packaging ==
=== Origin of album title ===
Al Kooper recalled that both the album title, Blonde on Blonde, and song titles arrived during the mixing sessions. "When they were mixing it, we were sitting around and Bob Johnston came in and said, 'What do you want to call this?' And [Bob] just like said them out one at a time ... Free association and silliness, I'm sure, played a big role." Dylan himself has said of the title: "Well, I don't even recall exactly how it came up, but I know it was all in good faith ... I don't know who thought of that. I certainly didn't."

Several explanations have been put forward in an attempt to shed light on the identity or meaning of the blondes superimposed in the title. Two of these explanations are contemporary with the album and lead to personalities in Dylan's entourage at the time. To Edie Sedgwick, firstly, a short-lived celebrity in the New York underground in the mid-1960s, with blond hair and a pale complexion. (Note: The assumption was echoed by Patti Smith, in the poem she dedicated to Sedgwick's memory in 1972: "Everyone knew she was the real heroine of Blonde on Blonde. oh it is not fair / oh it is not fair / how her ermine hair / turned men around / she was white on white / so blonde on blonde" ("edie sedgwick (1943–1971)". January 3, 2015. In Smith 1972).) Then to Brian Jones and the blond couple that the founder of the Rolling Stones formed with the actress Anita Pallenberg. (Note: "The two of them, Brian and Annita, even looked alike after she dyed their already blond hair an even lighter color. They were a pair of incestuous, impossibly glamorous, twins." (Davis 2001, p. 147).)

Since the publication of Dylan's autobiographical Chronicles in 2004, another hypothesis has taken shape: that Blonde on Blonde is a tribute to Brecht on Brecht, a musical performance of Bertolt Brecht's songs which Dylan attended in 1963 and which had a profound effect on him. In addition to this analogy, it has become classic to point out that the initials of the title reproduce Dylan's first name, as a wink. Oliver Trager, for instance, in 2004: "Its title is at least a riff on Brecht on Brecht, a rather literary touch for rock ’n’ roll at the time. And let's not forget that the first letter of each word in the title form an anagram [sic, acronym] that spells the word 'Bob'."

In 2012, another theory was espoused in David Dalton's book Who Is That Man? In Search of the Real Bob Dylan. Dalton writes that "the title of the album itself is a double entendre that refers to a rock star's endless harem as well as to Kazimir Malevich's constructivist painting White Square on White. Avant-garde art sandwiched between serial blondes" (the painting is actually titled Suprematist Composition: White on White).

A new interpretation appeared in a French essay published in 2021. According to Like a Rolling Stone Revisited : Une relecture de Dylan [A Re-Reading of Dylan] by Jean-Michel Buizard, the title refers to two guitars that together form the musical heart of the album, two light wood and beige guitars, "blonde" in English usage – like the Gibson Nick Lucas Special and the Fender acoustic that Robertson and Dylan play face to face in a 1966 scene from the documentary Eat the Document: "two guitars of the same colour playing with each other, melodic line on rhythmic line, blonde on blonde." This interpretation is essentially based on two ideas drawn from Dylan's lyrics. On the one hand, the understanding that, in his most important and enigmatic songs of the 1965–1966 period, Dylan never stops talking about his music and, with it, about his place in the history of the blues. On the other hand, the discovery that a whole troupe of famous bluesmen, modern or old, parade through these same songs, each of them accompanied by his guitar disguised in a personified or metaphorical form.

=== Cover photo ===
The cover photo of Blonde on Blonde shows a 12-by-12-inch close-up portrait of Dylan. The double album gatefold sleeve opens to form a 12-by-26-inch photo of the artist, at three quarter length. The artist's name and the album's title only appear on the spine. A sticker was applied to the shrink wrap to promote the release's two hit singles, "I Want You" and "Rainy Day Women #12 & 35".

The cover shows Dylan in front of a brick building, wearing a suede jacket and a black and white checkered scarf. The jacket is the same one he wore on his next two albums, John Wesley Harding and Nashville Skyline. The photographer, Jerry Schatzberg, described how the photo was taken:

I wanted to find an interesting location outside of the studio. We went to the west side, where the Chelsea art galleries are now. At the time it was the meat packing district of New York and I liked the look of it. It was freezing and we were very cold. The frame he chose for the cover is blurred and out of focus. Of course everyone was trying to interpret the meaning, saying it must represent getting high on an LSD trip. It was none of the above; we were just cold and the two of us were shivering. There were other images that were sharp and in focus but, to his credit, Dylan liked that photograph.

Research by rock historian Bob Egan suggests the location of the cover photo was at 375 West Street, at the extreme west of Greenwich Village. The original inside gatefold featured nine black-and-white photos, all taken by Schatzberg and selected for the sleeve by Dylan himself. A shot of actress Claudia Cardinale from Schatzberg's portfolio was included but later withdrawn because it had been used without her authorization and Cardinale's representatives threatened to sue, making the original record sleeves a collector's item. Dylan included a self-portrait by Schatzberg as a credit to the photographer. The photos, for Gill, added up to "a shadowy glimpse of [Dylan's] life, including an enigmatic posed shot of Dylan holding a small portrait of a woman in one hand and a pair of pliers in the other: they all contributed to the album's air of reclusive yet sybaritic genius."

== Release and reception ==
Blonde on Blonde reached the Top 10 in both the US and UK album charts, and also spawned a number of hits that restored Dylan to the upper echelons of the singles charts. In August 1967, the album was certified as a gold disc.

A high-definition 5.1 surround sound edition of the album was released on SACD by Columbia in 2003.

The album received generally favorable reviews. Pete Johnson in the Los Angeles Times wrote, "Dylan is a superbly eloquent writer of pop and folk songs with an unmatched ability to press complex ideas and iconoclastic philosophy into brief poetic lines and startling images." The editor of Crawdaddy!, Paul Williams, reviewed Blonde on Blonde in July 1966: "It is a cache of emotion, a well handled package of excellent music and better poetry, blended and meshed and ready to become part of your reality. Here is a man who will speak to you, a 1960s bard with electric lyre and color slides, but a truthful man with x-ray eyes you can look through if you want. All you have to do is listen."

To accompany the songbook of Blonde on Blonde, Paul Nelson wrote an introduction stating, "The very title suggests the singularity and the duality we expect from Dylan. For Dylan's music of illusion and delusion—with the tramp as explorer and the clown as happy victim, where the greatest crimes are lifelessness and the inability to see oneself as a circus performer in the show of life—has always carried within it its own inherent tensions ... Dylan in the end truly UNDERSTANDS situations, and once one truly understands anything, there can no longer be anger, no longer be moralizing, but only humor and compassion, only pity." In May 1968 for Esquire, Robert Christgau said Dylan had "presented his work at its most involuted, neurotic, and pop—and exhilarating—in Blonde on Blonde."

=== Date discrepancy ===
Blonde on Blonde was released on June 20, 1966, but for many years, May 16 was thought to be the correct date. Michael Gray, author of The Bob Dylan Encyclopedia, had contended that the release date was actually around late June or early July. This coincides with the album's promotion in Billboard, which carried a full-page Columbia advertisement on June 25, selected the album as a "New Action LP" on July 9, and ran a review and article on July 16. In 2017, after viewing a Sony database of album releases, Heylin found that the release date was in fact June 20. This is supported by the fact that an overdub on "Fourth Time Around" was recorded in June.

The album debuted on Billboard's Top LPs chart on July 23 at number 101—just six days before Dylan's motorcycle accident in Woodstock removed him from public view. By contrast, another contemporary LP which has an official 1966 release date of May 16, Pet Sounds by the Beach Boys, entered the Billboard LP chart less than two weeks after release on May 28 at number 105.

Blonde on Blonde has been described as rock's first studio double LP by a major artist, released just one week before Freak Out!, the double album by the Mothers of Invention.

== Reappraisal and legacy ==
Retrospective professional reviews
Review scores
Source	Rating
AllMusic	5/5 stars
The Encyclopedia of Popular Music	5/5 stars
Entertainment Weekly	A+
The Great Rock Discography	10/10
MusicHound Rock	5/5
The Rolling Stone Album Guide	5/5 stars
Tom Hull	A−

Twelve years after its release, Dylan said: "The closest I ever got to the sound I hear in my mind was on individual bands in the Blonde on Blonde album. It's that thin, that wild mercury sound. It's metallic and bright gold, with whatever that conjures up." For critics, the double album was seen as the last installment in Dylan's trilogy of mid-1960s rock albums. As Janet Maslin wrote, "The three albums of this period—Bringing It All Back Home and Highway 61 Revisited both released in 1965, and Blonde on Blonde from 1966—used their electric instrumentation and rock arrangements to achieve a crashing exuberance Dylan hadn't approached before." Mike Marqusee has described Dylan's output between late 1964 and the summer of 1966, when he recorded these three albums, as "a body of work that remains unique in popular music." For Patrick Humphries, "Dylan's body of work during the 14-months period ... stands unequalled in rock's 30-year history. In substance, style, ambition and achievement, no one has even come close to matching Bringing It All Back Home, Highway 61 Revisited and Blonde on Blonde." Music journalist Gary Graff points to Highway 61 Revisited and Blonde on Blonde, along with the Beach Boys' Pet Sounds (1966), as possible starting points to the album era, as they each constituted "a cohesive and conceptual body of work rather than just some hit singles ... with filler tracks."

Dylan scholar Michael Gray wrote: "To have followed up one masterpiece with another was Dylan's history making achievement here ... Where Highway 61 Revisited has Dylan exposing and confronting like a laser beam in surgery, descending from outside the sickness, Blonde on Blonde offers a persona awash inside the chaos ... We're tossed from song to song ... The feel and the music are on a grand scale, and the language and delivery are a unique mixture of the visionary and the colloquial." Critic Tim Riley wrote: "A sprawling abstraction of eccentric blues revisionism, Blonde on Blonde confirms Dylan's stature as the greatest American rock presence since Elvis Presley." Biographer Robert Shelton saw the album as "a hallmark collection that completes his first major rock cycle, which began with Bringing It All Back Home". Summing up the album's achievement, Shelton wrote that Blonde on Blonde "begins with a joke and ends with a hymn; in between wit alternates with a dominant theme of entrapment by circumstances, love, society, and unrealized hope ... There's a remarkable marriage of funky, bluesy rock expressionism, and Rimbaud-like visions of discontinuity, chaos, emptiness, loss, being 'stuck'."

That sense of crossing cultural boundaries was, for Al Kooper, at the heart of Blonde on Blonde: "[Bob Dylan] was the quintessential New York hipster—what was he doing in Nashville? It didn't make any sense whatsoever. But you take those two elements, pour them into a test tube, and it just exploded." For Mike Marqusee, Dylan had succeeded in combining traditional blues material with modernist literary techniques: "[Dylan] took inherited idioms and boosted them into a modernist stratosphere. 'Pledging My Time' and 'Obviously 5 Believers' adhered to blues patterns that were venerable when Dylan first encountered them in the mid-fifties (both begin with the ritual Delta invocation of "early in the mornin"). Yet like 'Visions of Johanna' or 'Memphis Blues Again', these songs are beyond category. They are allusive, repetitive, jaggedly abstract compositions that defy reduction."

Blonde on Blonde has been ranked high in critics' polls of the greatest albums of all time. In 1974, the writers of NME voted Blonde on Blonde the number-two album of all time. It was ranked second in the 1978 book Critic's Choice: Top 200 Albums and third in the 1987 edition. In 1997 the album was placed at number 16 in a "Music of the Millennium" poll conducted by HMV, Channel 4, The Guardian and Classic FM. In 2006, Time magazine included the record on their 100 All-Time Albums list. In 2003, the album was ranked number nine on Rolling Stone magazine's list of "The 500 Greatest Albums of All Time", maintaining the rating in a 2012 revised list, while dropping to number 38 in 2020. In 2004, two songs from the album also appeared on the magazine's list of "The 500 Greatest Songs of All Time": "Just Like a Woman" ranked number 230 and "Visions of Johanna" number 404. (When Rolling Stone updated this list in 2010, "Just Like a Woman" dropped to number 232 and "Visions of Johanna" to number 413. Then in 2021, "Visions of Johanna" was re-ranked at number 317.) The album was included in Robert Christgau's "Basic Record Library" of 1950s and 1960s recordings—published in Christgau's Record Guide: Rock Albums of the Seventies (1981)—and in critic Robert Dimery's book 1001 Albums You Must Hear Before You Die. It was voted number 33 in the third edition of Colin Larkin's All Time Top 1000 Albums (2000). It was inducted into the Grammy Hall of Fame in 1999. When Dylan was awarded the Nobel Prize for Literature in 2016, Swedish Academy Secretary Sara Danius, when asked how to evaluate Dylan's literary merit, suggested listening first to Blonde on Blonde.

== Track listing ==
All tracks are written by Bob Dylan.

Side one
No.	Title	Length
1.	"Rainy Day Women #12 & 35"	4:36
2.	"Pledging My Time"	3:50
3.	"Visions of Johanna"	7:33
4.	"One of Us Must Know (Sooner or Later)"	4:54
Total length:		20:53

Side two
No.	Title	Length
1.	"I Want You"	3:07
2.	"Stuck Inside of Mobile with the Memphis Blues Again"	7:05
3.	"Leopard-Skin Pill-Box Hat"	3:58
4.	"Just Like a Woman"	4:52
Total length:		19:02

Side three
No.	Title	Length
1.	"Most Likely You Go Your Way and I'll Go Mine"	3:30
2.	"Temporary Like Achilles"	5:02
3.	"Absolutely Sweet Marie"	4:57
4.	"4th Time Around"	4:35
5.	"Obviously 5 Believers"	3:35
Total length:		21:19

Side four
No.	Title	Length
1.	"Sad Eyed Lady of the Lowlands"	11:23
Total length:		11:23 72:37

== Personnel ==
The personnel involved in making Blonde on Blonde is subject to some discrepancy:

- Bob Dylan – vocals; harmonica (tracks 1, 2, 4, 5, 8–12, 14), guitar (tracks 4, 7, 13), acoustic guitar (tracks 5, 6, 8, 12, 14)

Additional musicians

- Robbie Robertson – guitar (tracks 2–4, 7, 9–11, 13)
- Rick Danko – bass guitar (track 4)
- Charlie McCoy – trumpet (tracks 1, 9), acoustic guitar (tracks 2, 3, 5–8, 11, 12, 14), harmonica (tracks 3, 6, 13), bass guitar (track 10)
- Al Kooper – tambourine (track 1), organ (tracks 2–9, 11–14), electric piano (track 10)
- Wayne Moss – bass guitar (track 1), guitar (tracks 3, 5–9, 11, 13), acoustic guitar (tracks 12, 14)
- Joe South – guitar (tracks 2, 6–8, 10, 11, 14), bass guitar (tracks 3, 5, 9, 12, 14)
- Kenneth Buttrey – percussion; drums (tracks 1–3, 5–14)
- Hargus "Pig" Robbins – piano (tracks 1, 2, 5–11, 13, 14)
- Henry Strzelecki – organ (track 1), bass guitar (tracks 2, 5–8, 11, 13)
- Bobby Gregg – drums (track 4)
- Paul Griffin – piano (track 4)
- Mac Gayden – guitar (track 11)
- Wayne Butler – trombone (track 1)

Technical

- Bob Johnston – record producer
- Jerry Schatzberg – cover photographer

== Charts ==
=== Weekly charts ===
Year	Chart	Position
1966	Billboard Top LPs	9
1966	UK Top 75	3
1966	Spanish Albums Chart	11

=== Singles ===
Year	Single	Chart	Position
1966	"One of Us Must Know"	UK Top 75	33
1966	"Rainy Day Women #12 & 35"	Billboard Hot 100	2
1966	"Rainy Day Women #12 & 35"	UK Top 75	7
1966	"I Want You"	Billboard Hot 100	20
1966	"I Want You"	UK Top 75	16
1966	"Just Like a Woman"	Billboard Hot 100	33
1967	"Leopard-Skin Pillbox Hat"	Billboard Hot 100	81

== Certifications ==
Region	Certification	Certified units/sales
United Kingdom (BPI)	Platinum	300,000^{^}
United States (RIAA)	2× Platinum	2,000,000^{^}
^{^} Shipments figures based on certification alone.

== See also ==
- 50 Years of Blonde on Blonde, a 2017 live album by Old Crow Medicine Show covering these songs
