= Absolutely Sweet Marie =

1966 song by Bob Dylan

Song by Bob Dylan

from the album Blonde on Blonde
- Released: June 20, 1966
- Recorded: March 8, 1966
- Studio: Columbia Studio A (Nashville, Tennessee)
- Genre: Rock
- Length: 4:57
- Label: Columbia
- Songwriter(s): Bob Dylan
- Producer(s): Bob Johnston

Audio
- "Absolutely Sweet Marie" by Bob Dylan on YouTube

"Absolutely Sweet Marie" is a song by American singer-songwriter Bob Dylan, which was released on the third side of the double album and Dylan's seventh studio album, Blonde on Blonde (1966). The song was written by Dylan and produced by Bob Johnston. It was recorded at around 1:00 am on March 8, 1966, at Columbia Studio A, Nashville. Some commentators have interpreted the song as being about sexual frustration.

The song has received critical acclaim; Rolling Stone placed the track 78th in their 2015 ranking of the 100 greatest Dylan songs. Dylan first performed "Absolutely Sweet Marie" live in concert on the first night of his Never Ending Tour, in Concord, California, on June 7, 1988. In all, he has played the song in concert 181 times, most recently in 2012. It was later included on The Original Mono Recordings (2010) and alternate versions appeared on The Bootleg Series Vol. 12: The Cutting Edge 1965–1966 (2015). George Harrison performed the song for The 30th Anniversary Concert Celebration (1993).

== Background and recording ==
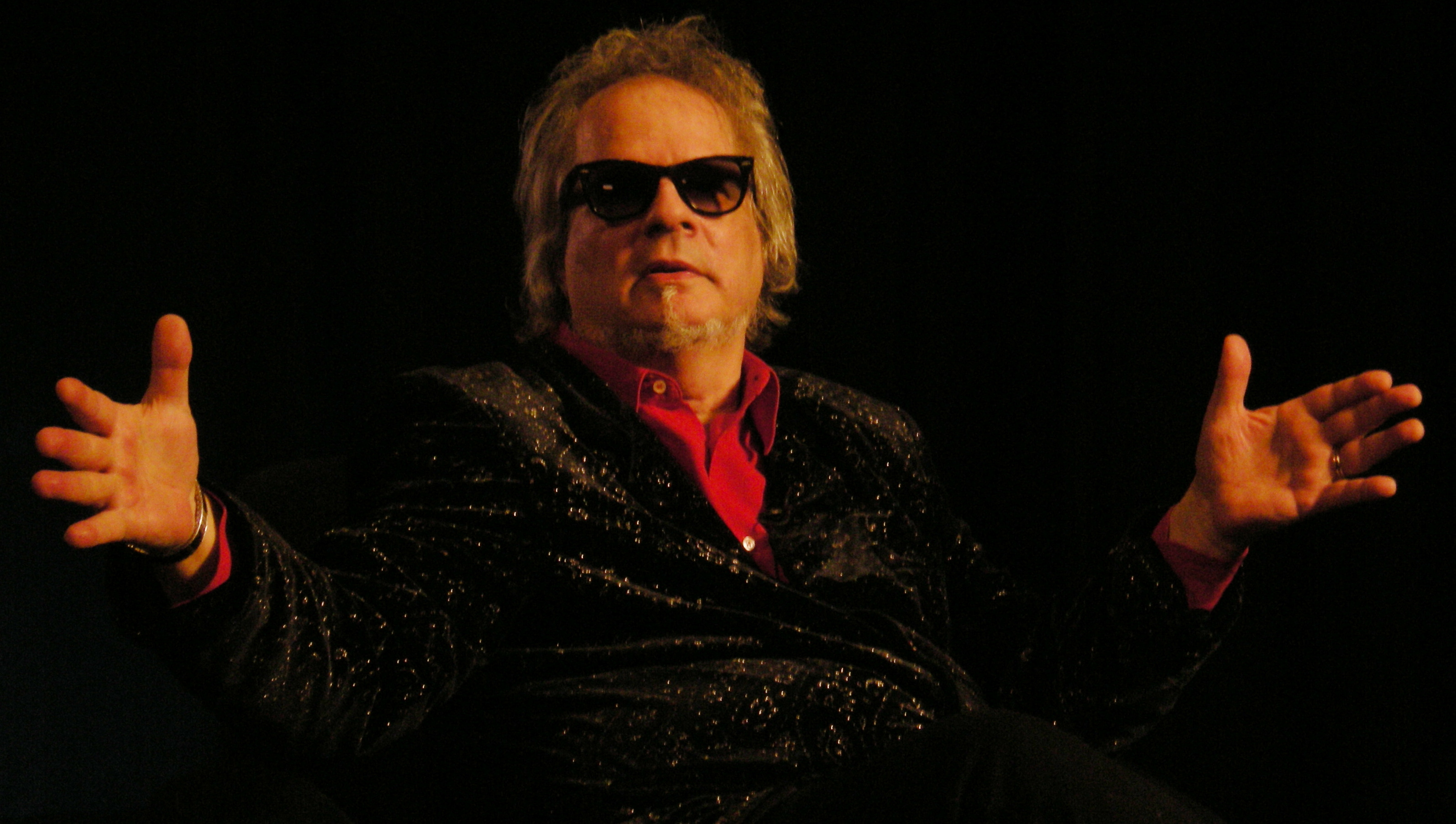
According to journalist Daryl Sanders, Al Kooper (pictured in 2009) provided an "unforgettable organ riff that enhanced the song and gave the song its primary melodic hook".

Bob Dylan's sixth studio album Highway 61 Revisited was released in August 1965. Bob Johnston had produced all but the first two of the six recording sessions, and was again the producer when recording started for Dylan's next album on October 5, 1965, at Columbia Studio A, New York City. Further sessions in New York took place on November 30, and January 21, 25 and 27, 1966. Johnston suggested a change of location to Nashville, after the January sessions were unproductive. Robbie Robertson and Al Kooper, who had both played at earlier sessions, were joined by experienced Nashville session musicians, including Joe South, Charlie McCoy, Wayne Moss, and Kenneth Buttrey, for sessions at Columbia Studio A, initially on February 14, 1966.

"Absolutely Sweet Marie" was recorded at around 1:00 am on March 8, 1966, during the 10th album session, that had started at 9:30 pm the previous evening; it was the only song played during the session. Dylan sang and played harmonica, accompanied by Robertson, Moss, South and Mac Gayden (electric guitars); McCoy (acoustic guitar); Kooper (organ); Hargus "Pig" Robbins (piano); Henry Strzelecki (electric bass guitar); and Buttrey (drums). A rehearsal was followed by a complete take; a false start; a second complete take; and a recording of part of the song (an "insert"). The session finished at around 4:00 am. The second of the complete takes was released on Blonde on Blonde, Dylan's seventh studio album, on June 20, 1966. The LP record was the first rock double album, and "Absolutely Sweet Marie" appeared as the third of five tracks on the third side. The first complete take was released on The Bootleg Series Vol. 12: The Cutting Edge 1965–1966 in 2015.

== Composition and lyrical interpretation ==
"Absolutely Sweet Marie" was written by Dylan in the studio. The handwritten lyrics from the session largely reflect the recorded versions, apart from several changes in the first verse. The original lyrics omit the "railroad gate" that is in the first line of the released version, and although the studio log shows the song listed as "Where Are You Tonight, Sweet Marie?", the line does not appear in the written lyrics or the first take. The song's bridge, which refers to a "riverboat captain" who knows the narrator's fate, is also not in the original lyrics, although there is a note that "they all know my fate". Oliver Trager notes that possible inspirations for the name of the song have included "everything from a type of biscuit to a famous carnival 'Fat Lady' to a popular nineteenth century song by Percy French ... ('Mountains of the Mourne')". Philippe Margotin and Jean-Michel Guesdon describe the song as a "mid-tempo rock song", with similarities to a British Invasion sound. Buttrey's drumming features prominently on the track; organist Kooper remarked that "the beat is amazing, and that's what makes the track work".

According to the American historian Timothy Hampton, the narrator of the song is imprisoned. In Vanity Fair, Mike Hogan wrote that the song was about "being at the mercy of a much stronger woman". Journalist Paul Williams considers that "the whole album is about sexuality and power", and names "Absolutely Sweet Marie" as one of several songs on Blonde on Blonde referring to "the power and confusion of sexual connection, the mysteries and frustrations and rewards of the sexual encounter (always tied up in the problem or fear of being misunderstood)". Critic Andy Gill and Trager both interpret the song as about sexual frustration, citing the lines where the narrator refers to "beating on my trumpet" after mentioning "it gets so hard, you see". Gill notes that images used in the song, such as railroads, had gained a sexual connotation in songs; "white horses" in the traditional "She'll Be Coming 'Round the Mountain", and Blind Lemon Jefferson's "See That My Grave Is Kept Clean", are a "blues image of sexual potency". Scholar of English Louis Renza remarked that Dylan's song "unquestionably traffics in sexual innuendo from first to last".

The song features mosaic rhymes in the style of poet Robert Browning, and as used in some Tin Pan Alley songs. Scholar of literature Jim Curtis wrote that "Absolutely Sweet Marie" "has a five-line stanza which rhymes ababb, where the a rhymes are consistently mosaic rhymes. Thus, in the first stanza Dylan rhymes 'Jump it/trumpet' and in the second stanza 'half sick/traffic.'" Music scholar Larry Starr wrote of "Absolutely Sweet Marie" that it was "probably the most unconventional of the Blonde on Blonde songs from a formal standpoint". He highlighted how the bridge music features twice, with different lyrics, and a "sudden, striking beginning on an out of key chord".

During a 1991 interview published in Paul Zollo's book Songwriters on Songwriting (1997), Dylan gives an idea of how he sees the song in his explanation of a line about a "yellow railroad":

That's about as complete as you can be. Every single letter in that line. It's all true. On a literal and on an escapist level.... Getting back to the yellow railroad, that could be from looking someplace. Being a performer, you travel the world. You're not just looking out of the same window every day. You're not just walking down the same old street. So you must make yourself observe whatever. But most of the time it hits you. You don't have to observe. It hits you. Like, "yellow railroad" could have been a blinding day when the sun was so bright on a railroad someplace and it stayed on my mind... These aren't contrived images. These are images which are just in there and have got to come out.

The song contains the phrase "To live outside the law you must be honest". Jonathan Lethem points to a very similar line by the screenwriter Stirling Silliphant in the 1958 film The Lineup: "When you live outside the law, you have to eliminate dishonesty"; without attribution, Lethem imagines that Dylan "heard it ... cleaned it up a little, and inserted it into" this song. This possible allusion is also noted by Trager.

== Critical reception ==
The Sun-Herald's reviewer gave a negative view of what they referred to as "pop songs" on Blonde on Blonde, mentioning "Absolutely Sweet Marie" and other tracks, dismissing them with the comment that "the fancy words are inclined to hide the fact that there is nothing there at all".

Dylan biographer Robert Shelton found the track "catchy and bright, sparked off by a great organ proclamation ... The band's ensemble sound is tight, over insistent drumming." Michael Gray wrote that "the words are borne along on a sea of rich red music, bobbing with a stylish and highly distinctive rhythm". Gray praised Dylan's vocal performance as amongst his best, and regards the delivery of the line which concludes each verse as having "as much alert variety in delivery as would be humanly yet still felicitously possible". Trager wrote that the track is "an elixir to those who found Dylan's mid-'60s songs a bit dour ... an exuberant, pure Beale Street, up-tempo skip complete with a slew of memorable lines that could be anyone's koan". A reviewer for the Runcorn Weekly News described "Absolutely Sweet Marie" as a "real gem". Curtis praised how "discipline and verbal mastery to create such stable structures for his startling imagery. The tensions between his surrealistic, unpredictable images and his traditional, predictable stanzaic forms produces [sic] the extraordinary effects to which we responded so intensely."

Rolling Stone placed the track 78th in their 2015 ranking of the 100 greatest Dylan songs, calling it "a cryptic love letter that rides a bubblegum electric keyboard and sparkling blues-rock guitar". Author John Nogowski highlighted the mid-song "wild harmonica solo", and rated the song "A". In 1991, Dylan said of the song: "It's matured well ... It's like old wine."

== Live performances and later releases ==
Dylan first performed "Absolutely Sweet Marie" live in concert on the first night of his Never Ending Tour, in Concord, California, on June 7, 1988. According to Dylan's official website, he has played the song live 181 times, most recently in 2012. The track was included on albums called Bob Dylan's Greatest Hits 2 in the Netherlands and West Germany in 1967, with "Marie" wrongly spelled as "Mary" on the sleeve and label. The same spelling error occurred on other releases in varying formats of Bob Dylan's Greatest Hits 2 in France, India, and Yugoslavia. The song was included on The Original Mono Recordings (2010) and alternate versions appeared on The Bootleg Series Vol. 12: The Cutting Edge 1965–1966 (2015).

== Personnel ==
Credits adapted from the That Thin, Wild Mercury Sound: Dylan, Nashville, and the Making of Blonde on Blonde book.

Musicians

- Bob Dylan – vocals, harmonica
- Charlie McCoy – acoustic guitar
- Robbie Robertson – electric guitar
- Wayne Moss – electric guitar
- Joe South – electric guitar
- Mac Gayden – electric guitar
- Al Kooper – organ
- Hargus "Pig" Robbins – piano
- Henry Strzelecki – electric bass guitar
- Kenneth Buttrey – drums

Technical

- Bob Johnston – record producer
