= Rowland Scherman =

American photographer (born 1937)

Rowland Scherman is an American photographer.

Rowland Scherman was born in New York in 1937. He studied at Oberlin College, and was dark room apprentice at Life magazine. He was the first photographer for the newly formed Peace Corps in 1961. His photographs appeared in Life, Look, Time, National Geographic, Paris Match and Playboy, among many others, and he photographed many of the iconic musical, cultural, and political events of the 1960s, including the 1963 Newport Folk Festival, the Beatles first US concert, and Woodstock. He won a Grammy Award in 1968 for his photograph cover of Bob Dylan's Greatest Hits. His published collections include "Love Letters", an alphabet formed by posed dancers, and "Elvis is Everywhere." He lived in Birmingham, Alabama, and documented Alabama's Highway 11. He now lives on Cape Cod. Rowland Scherman describes his day as the official photographer for USIA at the March on Washington, 1963. In his book, Timeless--photography of Rowland Scherman, Scherman shows and comments on some of his most famous pictures.

A documentary movie was made about Rowland Scherman by Chris Szwedo, called Eye on the Sixties; it has been shown on public television and at the Smithsonian.

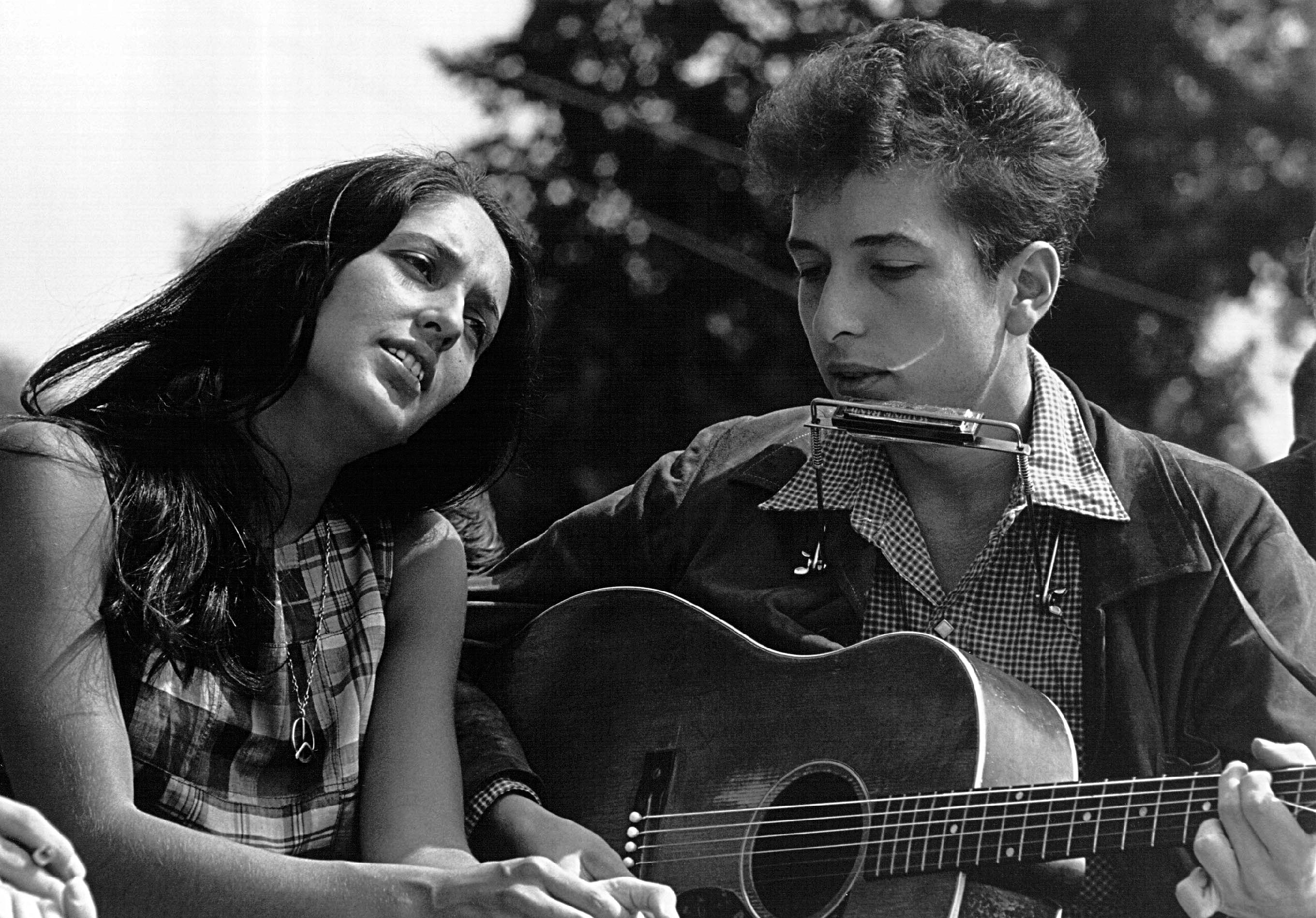
Photo by Scherman of Joan Baez and Bob Dylan at Newport Folk Festival, 1963.
