= Temporary Like Achilles =

1966 song by Bob Dylan

Song by Bob Dylan

from the album Blonde on Blonde
- Released: June 20, 1966
- Recorded: March 9, 1966
- Studio: Columbia Studio A (Nashville, Tennessee)
- Genre: Blues
- Length: 5:03
- Label: Columbia
- Songwriter(s): Bob Dylan
- Producer(s): Bob Johnston

Audio
- "Temporary Like Achilles" on YouTube

"Temporary Like Achilles" is a song by American singer-songwriter Bob Dylan that was released on side three of his double album, Blonde on Blonde (1966). (Note: See Blonde on Blonde regarding uncertainty about the release date.) The song was written by Dylan, and produced by Bob Johnston. It was recorded at Columbia Studio A, Nashville, Tennessee on March 9, 1966. The song is a blues number that incorporates elements of Dylan's incomplete "Medicine Sunday", which he had recorded with members of the Band in New York in October 1965. The song describes a narrator's frustration at being kept waiting by a woman that he wishes to be romantically involved with, who is guarded by "Achilles". Some critics have suggested that the song references the Iliad.

The song has received acclaim from critics for its lyrics and musicianship. A different take was included on The Bootleg Series Vol. 12: The Cutting Edge 1965–1966 (2015). A version of "Medicine Sunday" was issued on the Highway 61 Interactive interactive CD-ROM in 1995. As of November 2022, Dylan has never played "Temporary Like Achilles" live in concert.

== Background and recording ==
On October 5, 1965, Dylan recorded two versions of a song called "Medicine Sunday" in New York with Robbie Robertson, Garth Hudson, Rick Danko, and Richard Manuel of the Band, both versions consisting of one verse and a chorus, and neither lasting more than a minute. The recordings were in a folk rock style, both with the chorus "Well, I know you want my loving / Mama, but you're so hard" that was later adapted in "Temporary Like Achilles".

On March 9, 1966, between 9:00 pm and midnight, four versions of "Temporary Like Achilles" were recorded by Dylan and a band at Columbia Studio A, Nashville, with Bob Johnston as producer. Dylan reworked the lyrics during the first three takes, and wrote the lyrics for the first verse of the final version after take 3 was completed. Each verse of "Temporary Like Achilles" finishes with a version of the lines "You know I want your lovin'/Honey, but you're so hard", a reworking of the chorus from "Medicine Sunday". Take 4 was released on the double album Blonde on Blonde on June 20, 1966,, as the second track on side three, and Take 3 was later released on The Bootleg Series Vol. 12: The Cutting Edge 1965–1966 (2015). A version of "Medicine Sunday" (reported as being "Medicine Show") was issued on the Highway 61 Interactive interactive CD-ROM in 1995.

"Temporary Like Achilles" is described as a "smoky, slow-drag blues" number by Dylan biographer Robert Shelton, and similarly as a "slow, smoky blues" by Gill. It seems to be narrated by someone who has been rejected by a woman that is now with another person. In 1987, lyrics for "Temporary Like Achilles", handwritten by Dylan, were sold at auction for $7,577. They were bought from a collector by the Minnesota Historical Society in 1988.

The song has a bridge in an AABAA form. Music scholar Larry Starr described the bridge as "set off harmonically as well as lyrically, with a shift to minor chords and the singer's self-characterization as a 'poor fool'". Scholar of English Charles O. Hartman wrote that "Temporary Like Achilles" and "Most Likely You Go Your Way and I'll Go Mine", also from Blonde on Blonde, "are both experiments in combining Tin Pan Alley form with a musical and lyrical sensibility indebted ... to blues". The album version has a duration of five minutes and three seconds.

As of November 2022, Dylan has never played the song live in concert. Dylan biographer Clinton Heylin noted in 2010 that it was also the only track from Blonde on Blonde not to have been played by Dylan in tour rehearsals.

== Lyrical interpretation ==
The narrator of the song is being kept waiting by a woman that he wishes to be romantically involved with; she is guarded by "Achilles". When the narrator enters her hallway, and "Lean[s] against [her] velvet door", he sees a scorpion crawl across her "circus floor". Music journalist Daryl Sanders described the song as "a lover's lament built around one of the album's recurring themes: the narrator being blocked in one way or another, resulting in unfulfilled sexual longing". During the bridge, the narrator asks whether the woman he is talking to has a heart "made out of stone, or is it lime, or is it solid rock". Shelton pondered why the bodyguard was named after Achilles, and why he is temporary; he also wrote: "A whole poem could grow from one throwaway line: 'I'm helpless, like a rich man's child.'"

Classics scholar Owen Ewald has suggested that the song is inspired by the Iliad. Thomas Strunk, another classicist, has argued that classical poetry influenced Dylan, and also noted Dylan was a member of the Latin club in his high school years. Dylan mentioned the Odyssey, and specifically Odysseus' trip to see Achilles in the underworld, in his Nobel Prize in Literature acceptance speech. Monica Silveira Cyrino, another classics scholar, notes that the reference in the song to Achilles being "hungry, like a man in drag" recalls the episode where Achilles's mother Thetis disguises him in her clothes, so that he can hide with the daughters of Lycomedes.

Scholar of American literature Geoff Ward felt that "the layered ironies of 'Temporary Like Achilles' or 'Stuck Inside of Mobile with the Memphis Blues Again' mock both the authenticity cult of folk music, and the waftings of the incoming hippie generation, in one swoop".

== Critical reception ==
Craig McGregor in The Sydney Morning Herald praised the song as "entirely successful, uniquely and unmistakably Dylanish, a gentle and moving love song". The lyrics were described as "rich in metaphore and allegory" by a reviewer for Beat Instrumental.

Norman Jopling in Record Mirror wrote in his review of the album, "One of the worst tracks on the set is 'Temporary Like Achilles' .... There's some good Fats Domino styled piano for the intro, but the pleading, almost whining lyric is not very special." The piano on the track, by Hargus "Pig" Robbins, has been praised by Margotin and Guesdon, and by Gill, who calls it "beautifully evocative". Oliver Trager wrote that "Dylan's wheezing harmonica perfectly fits the song's mood of detachment and restrained disgust".

Author John Nogowski found the song "puzzling" and felt that "the refrain never seems to be resolved"; he gave the album version a "B" rating, and rated take 3, released on The Bootleg Series Vol. 12: The Cutting Edge 1965–1966, as a "B+".

== Personnel ==
Credits adapted from the That Thin, Wild Mercury Sound: Dylan, Nashville, and the Making of Blonde on Blonde book.

Musicians

- Bob Dylan – vocals, harmonica
- Robbie Robertson – electric guitar
- Joe South – electric guitar
- Hargus Robbins – piano
- Al Kooper – electric piano
- Charlie McCoy – electric bass
- Kenneth Buttrey – drums

Technical

- Bob Johnston – production
