= She's Your Lover Now =

Song by Bob Dylan

from the album The Bootleg Series Volumes 1-3 (Rare & Unreleased) 1961-1991
- Released: March 26, 1991
- Recorded: January 21, 1966
- Genre: Rock
- Length: 6:09
- Label: Columbia
- Songwriter: Bob Dylan
- Producer: Bob Johnston

"She's Your Lover Now" is a song written by the American singer-songwriter Bob Dylan, and recorded for his 1966 album Blonde on Blonde, but ultimately never used. It is a "dramatized scene for three players, but only one speaker – the singer – who's attempting to unravel a tangle of complicated emotions." Despite the unfinished recording, critic Greil Marcus wrote in his 1975 book Mystery Train that "thanks to a guitar note here, a piano rumble there, Dylan's bitterest lyrics, and his unforgiving vocal, it is one of the most terrifying performances ever recorded."

== Recording ==
The third session for Blonde on Blonde, which took place on January 21, 1966, in Studio A of Columbia Recording Studios in New York City, focused entirely on laying down a complete take of "She's Your Lover Now". Sixteen takes were recorded between 2:30 pm and 2:30 am, but several were false starts. The most complete take with the full band, albeit one that breaks down before the end of the song, was take 15, which was released in 1991 on The Bootleg Series Volumes 1-3 (Rare & Unreleased) 1961-1991. After January 21, 1966, the song was dropped from recording and never returned to.

Take 16, a complete version of the song with just Dylan on piano and vocals – which was highly praised by Paul Williams in Bob Dylan Performing Artist The Early Years 1960–1973 – was released in 2015 on the deluxe and collector's editions of The Bootleg Series Vol. 12: The Cutting Edge 1965–1966, along with various other takes of the song. Take 6 of the song appeared on all versions of The Bootleg Series Vol. 12.

On the recording sheet, each take is titled "Just a Little Glass of Water", which was the song's working name.

== Musical style ==
"She's Your Lover Now" is in the key of C♯, and follows a chord procession similar to that of "Like a Rolling Stone" (C-Dm-Em-F-G).

=== Lyrics ===
In the liner notes to The Bootleg Series Volumes 1–3, John Bauldie states that "it's just about impossible to do justice to its achievement, without writing an entire dissertation on the many simultaneous levels on which this song works." Because this recording of "She's Your Lover Now" breaks down before its end, the last verse is missing from the recording:

Now your eyes cry wolf,
While your mouth cries "I'm not scared
Of animals like you."
And you, there's been nothing of you I can recall;
I just saw you that one time. You were just there, that's all.
But, I've already been kissed,
I'm not gonna get into this.
I couldn't make it, anyhow.
You do it for me,
You're her lover now.

This verse is also missing from the official lyrics that appear in both Writings and Drawings and on bobdylan.com.

== Cover version ==
A cover version of the song by the band Luxuria was released in 1988 as the b-side of their single "Redneck".

== Personnel ==
- Bob Dylan: piano, vocals
- Robbie Robertson: guitar
- Garth Hudson: organ
- Rick Danko: bass
- Richard Manuel: piano
- Sandy Konikoff: drums

However, it has been speculated that Garth Hudson, Richard Manuel, and Sandy Konikoff did not play on this version, with Al Kooper on organ, Paul Griffin on piano, and Levon Helm on drums, instead.
