= 4th Time Around =

1966 song by Bob Dylan

Song by Bob Dylan

from the album Blonde on Blonde
- Released: June 20, 1966
- Recorded: February 14 and June 1966
- Studio: Columbia Studio A (Nashville, Tennessee)
- Length: 4:35
- Label: Columbia
- Songwriter: Bob Dylan
- Producer: Bob Johnston

Audio
- "4th Time Around" on YouTube

"4th Time Around" (also listed as "Fourth Time Around") is a song by the American singer-songwriter Bob Dylan, which was released as the 12th track on his seventh studio album Blonde on Blonde on June 20, 1966. The song was written by Dylan and produced by Bob Johnston. Commentators often interpret it as a parody of the Beatles' 1965 song "Norwegian Wood (This Bird Has Flown)". John Lennon (Note: In 1980, Lennon claimed full authorship of the song, but Paul McCartney may have co-written the lyrics and/or music.) composed "Norwegian Wood" after being influenced by the introspective lyrics of Dylan. Lennon later reflected on his feelings of paranoia when Dylan first played him "4th Time Around".

Twenty takes of "4th Time Around", most of them incomplete, were recorded at Columbia Studio A, Nashville, on February 14, 1966. The last of these was used for the album. "4th Time Around" has received critical acclaim, despite being identified as one of the lesser tracks on Blonde on Blonde.

== Background and recording ==
A few weeks after the release of his sixth studio album Highway 61 Revisited (1965), Bob Dylan's first recording session for his next album was on October 5, 1965, at Columbia Studio A, New York City. The producer was Bob Johnston who had supervised from the third, to the concluding sixth, recording session for Highway 61 Revisited at the same studio. After this session, Dylan toured the United States and Canada; there was a second recording session in New York on November 30, during the tour. Three recording sessions in January (on the 21st, 25th and 27th) were not productive.

At Johnston's suggestion, the location for the sessions was changed to Nashville, Tennessee. After two further concerts, the fifth album session took place at Columbia Studio A, Nashville. Johnston organized for experienced session musicians including Charlie McCoy, Wayne Moss, Kenneth Buttrey and Joe South to play with Dylan. They were joined by Robbie Robertson and Al Kooper who had both played at earlier sessions. Twenty takes of "4th Time Around", most of them incomplete, were recorded at the start of the first Nashville session, on February 14, 1966. The twentieth take was used on Blonde on Blonde, with overdubs recorded in June. The album was released on June 20, 1966.

Dylan biographer Robert Shelton wrote that "the guitar figure repeats a rippling, romantic Mexican cadence". He related that Dylan told him that he had always been "hip to" Tejano music and a type of Mexican folk-pop music known as "cangacero", and that these had influenced his songs "It's All Over Now, Baby Blue" and "Just Like Tom Thumb's Blues" as well as "4th Time Around".

== Composition and lyrical interpretation ==
Dylan biographer Clinton Heylin speculated that "4th Time Around" was written either hours or days before the Nashville recording session. Yet journalist Johnny Black claims that the song existed "for some time" before the Nashville sessions, relying on Al Kooper's recollection: "[Bob] said that he had played it to [the Beatles]. So I asked him if they'd remarked on how similar it sounded to Norwegian Wood and he said, 'When I played it to them, there was no Norwegian Wood.' Then I asked if they might sue him. He said, 'No, my song came first. I could sue them.'"

The song has five verses, each with nine lines. The lyrics appear to address a love triangle, and the narrator's memories of a separation from a former lover. Scholar of English literature Michael Rodgers wrote that "the song is notable for its vitriol and how much the speaker acts the clown". In the first verse, a woman that the narrator has been arguing with says "Everybody must give something back/For something they get". The narrator questions why, and in the second verse, responds immaturely as he relates that he "gallantly handed her/My very last piece of gum". Critic Michael Gray refers to the start of the track as a "cold, mocking put-down of a woman and a relationship untouched by love". He writes that the song contains instances of sexual innuendo that highlight "Dylan's skill in pursuing the suggestive".

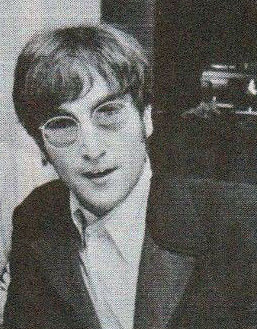
John Lennon in October 1966

Commentators often interpret "4th Time Around" as a response to the Beatles' song "Norwegian Wood (This Bird Has Flown)", written by John Lennon for the 1965 album Rubber Soul. "Norwegian Wood" obliquely addresses Lennon's romantic affair with a journalist. Dylan and the Beatles first met each other in August 1964, in New York. They were appreciative of each other's work, and some commentators have identified Dylan, whose lyrics contained "honest self-scrutiny and melancholy" as an influence on Lennon's writing in particular, first evidenced in "I'm a Loser" (1964). Heylin has suggested that Dylan, having noticed his influence on Rubber Soul, wrote "4th Time Around" as "a way of showing that he could raise the bar lyrically on Lennon".

The songs share a similar melody, although their orchestrations differ. Scholar of English Charles O. Hartman wrote that the song is "made of stanzas each of which is an AABA structure, placing the song among Dylan's most baroque concoctions". Lennon was asked about the track in a 1968 Rolling Stone interview, in which he stated:

I was very paranoid about that. I remember he played it to me when he was in London. He said, what do you think? I said, I don't like it. I didn't like it. I was very paranoid. I just didn't like what I felt I was feeling – I thought it was an out and out skit, you know, but it wasn't. It was great. I mean he wasn't playing any tricks on me. I was just going through the bit.

Gray comments that "it says something ... that Dylan was suspected (not least by Lennon) of parodying rather than copying". Heylin regards Dylan's song as "altogether darker, more disturbing". Classics scholar Richard F. Thomas considers that the Beatles track "sounds coy, almost innocent in comparison to the sophistication of Dylan's voice and lyrics". Thomas argued that if indeed "4th Time Around" is addressed to the Beatles, then its closing couplet, "I never asked for your crutch/Now don't ask for mine", is "devastating", and a message to the Beatles to "[s]tay away from what I'm doing". He believes that it rings true to hear that Lennon was "unhappy at what must have seemed like mockery and parody", and that Dylan does in fact "parody the simple rhyme of the Beatles song".

== Critical reception ==
Ralph J. Gleason of the San Francisco Examiner praised the song for "some great, grotesque and funny lines that dip into reality". Scholar Sean Wilentz wrote that "4th Time Around" sounds "like Bob Dylan impersonating John Lennon impersonating Bob Dylan", and is "slight" in comparison to Dylan's "Visions of Johanna'". Shelton described Dylan's voice on the track as that of "a tired, old bluesman" and commented that "The lyric is runaway fantasy, almost incongruous against the soft musical flow". Rodgers finds that the "reprehensible" image presented by the narrator is "heavily distorted by boyish naiveté and Socratic irony and actually works in such a way as to make the whole affair extremely humorous". Although he writes positively about the song, Gray considers it one of the lesser tracks on Blonde on Blonde. Rolling Stone rated the song as 54th in a 2015 ranking of the "100 Greatest Bob Dylan Songs".

== Live performances ==
According to his official website, Dylan has played the song in concert 37 times. The live debut was on February 26, 1966, at Island Garden, West Hempstead, New York, and it featured regularly on setlists until the conclusion of his 1966 World Tour, on May 26, 1966, at the Royal Albert Hall, London. One-off acoustic performances in 1974 and 1978 have been criticized as "among Dylan's worst-ever live performances" by Heylin, who praised the 1966 performances, where he felt Dylan was focused, and a 1975 Rolling Thunder Revue live rendition that he felt "came caressingly close to [the song's] corrosive core". The song also featured in Dylan shows in 1999, 2000, and 2002.

== Personnel ==
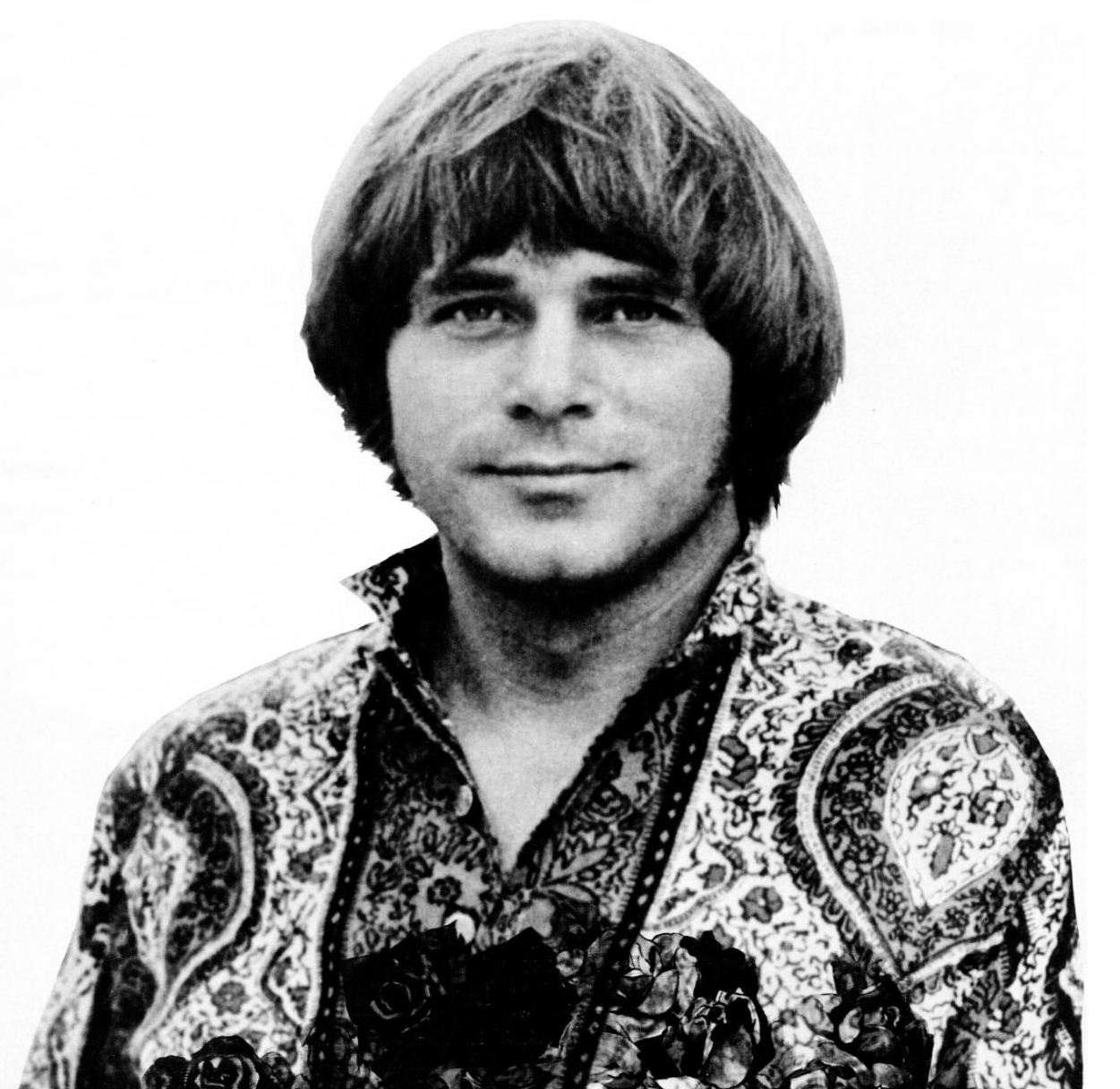
Joe South (pictured in 1970) played on the track

The details of the personnel involved in making Blonde on Blonde are subject to some uncertainty. According to Daryl Sanders, the musicians on "4th Time Around" were as follows:

Musicians

- Bob Dylan – vocals, acoustic guitar, harmonica
- Wayne Moss – acoustic guitar
- Charlie McCoy – acoustic guitar
- Joe South – electric bass
- Al Kooper – organ (Note: According to Sanders, Kooper's organ part was included on the mono releases of the album in France and Canada, and on the initial stereo release, but was not included on later stereo releases.)
- Kenneth Buttrey – drums

Technical

- Bob Johnston – record producer
