= Henry Strzelecki =

American musician (1939–2014)

- Born: Henry Pershing Strzelecki; August 8, 1939; Birmingham, Alabama
- Died: December 30, 2014 (aged 75) Nashville, Tennessee
- Genres: Country, Rock & Roll
- Occupation: Musician
- Instruments: Double bass, bass guitar

Henry Pershing Strzelecki (August 8, 1939 – December 30, 2014) was a Nashville studio musician who performed with Roy Orbison, Chet Atkins, Waylon Jennings, Jim Reeves, Willie Nelson, Eddy Arnold, Bob Dylan, Johnny Cash, Ronnie Milsap, Merle Haggard, and many others.

Born in Birmingham, Alabama, Strzelecki began playing country music in his teens. He wrote the novelty song "Long Tall Texan," which was a hit for Murry Kellum in 1963 and was covered by The Beach Boys on their popular 1964 album Beach Boys Concert. He worked with Chet Atkins for many years, both in the studio and on tour. He was considered a primary member of the Nashville A-Team and worked with nearly every star to come out of Nashville in the 1960s, 1970s and 1980s.

In 1987 he was nominated for Bassman of the Year at the 23rd Academy of Country Music Awards. He was inducted to the Musicians Hall of Fame and Museum in 2007.

Strzelecki was struck by a car in Nashville on December 22 and died of his injuries on December 30, 2014.

== See also ==
- The Nashville A-Team
- Strzelecki (disambiguation)
