= Wayne Moss =

American session guitarist (1938–2026)

- Born: February 9, 1938; South Charleston, West Virginia, U.S.
- Died: April 20, 2026 (aged 88); Madison, Tennessee, U.S.

Wayne Moss (February 9, 1938 – April 20, 2026) was an American guitarist, bassist, producer, and songwriter best known for his session work in Nashville. In 1961, Moss founded Cinderella Sound recording studio. In 2011 it was Nashville's oldest surviving independent studio. Moss was one of the founders of Area Code 615 and Barefoot Jerry, both bands made up of Nashville session players.

== Life and career ==
Moss was born in South Charleston, West Virginia, on February 9, 1938. As a teenager he played in bands in nearby Charleston before eventually moving to Nashville, Tennessee, in 1959. He became friends with Kenny Buttrey and Charlie McCoy. Hargus "Pig" Robbins hired him as a session musician, leading to Moss playing on recordings by artists including Patsy Cline, Waylon Jennings, Loretta Lynn, Charley Pride, Joan Baez, Steve Miller Band, and Linda Ronstadt.

The first number one hit song that Moss played on was Tommy Roe's "Sheila" (1962). He also played guitar on Roy Orbison's hit song "Oh, Pretty Woman" (1964), and played guitar and bass on Bob Dylan's acclaimed album Blonde On Blonde (1966). He also played on Joe Simon's 1969 album The Chokin' Kind, as well as guitar on Dolly Parton's signature song "Jolene" (1973).

Other artists whose recordings Moss has played on as a session musician include Charlie Daniels, Fats Domino, Everly Brothers, Lefty Frizzell, Leo Kottke, Kris Kristofferson, Dennis Linde, Charlie McCoy, Moon Mullican, Mike Nesmith, Carl Perkins, and Nancy Sinatra. He also played with Brenda Lee as a member of her touring band.

Moss died at his home in Madison, Tennessee, on April 20, 2026, at the age of 88.

== Cinderella Sound ==
When the Sack, a Nashville nightclub Moss and McCoy had been running, went out of business in 1961, they used the equipment to build a recording studio in Moss's garage in Madison. The studio, which Moss named Cinderella Sound, has hosted recording sessions by artists including Jackie DeShannon, Steve Miller Band, Linda Ronstadt, Grand Funk Railroad, James Gang, Tracy Nelson, and Mickey Newbury.

== Selected discography ==
- Blonde On Blonde, Bob Dylan, 1966 (including guitar on "I Want You" and bass on "Rainy Day Women #12 & 35")
- Roy Orbison, "Pretty Woman"
- Stan Beaver, "I Got a Rocket in my Pocket"
- Tommy Roe, "Sheila"
- Joe Simon, "The Chokin' Kind", #13 and "Yours Love"
- Kai Winding, Modern Country (Verve, 1964)
