= Robert Shelton (critic) =

American music and film critic

Robert Shelton, born Robert Shapiro (June 28, 1926, Chicago, Illinois, United States – December 11, 1995, Brighton, England) was a music and film critic.

Shelton helped to launch the career of a then-unknown 20-year-old Bob Dylan. In 1961, Dylan was performing at Gerdes Folk City in the West Village, one of the best-known folk venues in New York, opening for the bluegrass act the Greenbriar Boys. Shelton's positive review in The New York Times brought crucial publicity to Dylan and led to a Columbia recording contract. Shelton had previously noted Dylan in a review for The New York Times of WRVR's live twelve-hour Hootenanny, July 29, 1961, at Riverside Church in Morningside Heights, Manhattan. "Among the newer promising talents deserving mention are a 20-year-old latter-day Guthrie disciple named Bob Dylan, with a curiously arresting mumbling, country-steeped manner." This was Dylan's first live radio performance.

== Biography ==
Shelton was born in Chicago in 1926 under the name Robert Shapiro, the son of Joseph and Hannah Shapiro, Russian Jewish immigrants. His father, a research chemist, was born in Minsk and came to the US in 1905. Shelton was raised in Chicago, served in the US Army in France during 1944–45, and attended the School of Journalism at Northwestern University. He moved to New York in the 1950s, and soon joined the staff of The New York Times. In 1955, Shelton was one of 30 New York Times staffers subpoenaed by the Senate Internal Security Subcommittee, who were informed by Times counsel Louis M. Loeb that they would be fired if they took the Fifth Amendment. Shelton refused to answer questions from the committee about any affiliation with the Communist Party or about fellow Times staffer Matilda Landsman, and was indicted by a grand jury for contempt. Because he did not plead the Fifth he was allowed to continue working at the Times but was transferred away from the news department onto the less sensitive entertainment desk, where he became a music critic. Convicted and sentenced to six months in prison, he appealed his conviction and had it reversed on a technicality, only to be indicted, retried, convicted, and have the conviction overturned on a technicality again. After several years of appeals in which he was represented by noted civil liberties lawyer Joseph L. Rauh, Jr. the case was finally dropped in the mid-1960s.

For a decade (1958–1968), Shelton reviewed music, in particular folk music, but also pop and country music, becoming a friend of many of the artists and extending his influence beyond the pages of the Times. He reviewed the inaugural Newport Folk Festival (NFF) for The New York Times and The Nation and edited the program for the influential 1963 NFF under the pen name 'Stacey Williams'. He wrote album notes for several artists, including Bob Dylan's first album (credited to 'Stacey Williams'). During the early 1960s, Shelton co-edited a magazine, Hootenanny, at the same time as his friend Linda Solomon edited a different magazine titled ABC-TV Hootenanny.

Shelton spent 20 years writing and rewriting his Dylan biography, No Direction Home, The Life and Music of Bob Dylan which was finally published in 1986, after years of arguments with publishers about the style and length of the work. Shelton's intention from the outset was to write a serious cultural study, not a showbiz biography; as a result, he later said his life's work had been "abridged over troubled waters". The title is taken from the lyric of Dylan's hit single, "Like a Rolling Stone". The same title, No Direction Home, was used by Martin Scorsese for his 2005 documentary film about Dylan's career from the beginning to his motorcycle crash in 1966. Other books by Shelton include Electric Muse: The Story Of Folk Into Rock and The Face of Folk Music. An updated edition of this book, The Electric Muse Revisited, with new material by Robin Denselow, one of the original quartet of contributors, is scheduled for publication by Omnibus Press in May 2021. The folk music charity Square Roots Productions was midwife to the project.

In 1969, Shelton moved to the United Kingdom, living in Hampstead and Sydenham, and then (from 1982) in the South Coast town of Brighton where he edited the Arts page of the Brighton Evening Argus and then wrote, mostly about films, for a number of other publications up to his death. On December 11, 1995, Shelton died at the age of 69 at the Royal Sussex County Hospital following a stroke. In 1996, Shelton's papers, and his collection of books, records and research material were donated to the Institute of Popular Music at the University of Liverpool.

== Books ==
- No Direction Home: The Life and Music of Bob Dylan, 1986, Da Capo Press reprint 2003, ISBN 0-306-81287-8.
- No Direction Home: The Life and Music of Bob Dylan: Revised and Updated Edition, 2011, Omnibus Press, ISBN 9781849389112 A new edition, with some 20,000 words of Shelton's original text restored, published in 2011 to mark Dylan's seventieth birthday.
- Bob Dylan: No Direction Home. Revised Illustrated Edition and with a New Foreword and Afterword by Elizabeth Thomson. 2021 Palazzo Editions UK, Sterling US/Canada, Hardie Grant Australia, Flammarion France, Pangea, Czech Republic
