= The Bootleg Series Vol. 12: The Cutting Edge 1965–1966 =

- Standard edition cover

Compilation album by Bob Dylan
- Released: November 6, 2015
- Recorded: January 13, 1965 – May 13, 1966
- Genre: Folk rock
- Length: 2:25:04 (standard); 6:58:27 (deluxe); 19:04:55 (Collector's Edition)
- Label: Columbia

Bob Dylan chronology
Shadows in the Night (2015)	The Bootleg Series Vol. 12: The Cutting Edge 1965–1966 (2015)	Fallen Angels (2016)

Bob Dylan Bootleg Series chronology
Vol. 11: The Basement Tapes Complete (2014)	Vol. 12: The Cutting Edge 1965–1966 (2015)	Vol. 13: Trouble No More 1979–1981 (2017)

Professional ratings
Aggregate scores
Source	Rating
Metacritic	99/100
Review scores
Source	Rating
AllMusic	5/5 stars
American Songwriter	5/5 stars
Billboard	4/5 stars
Drowned in Sound	10/10
Paste	10/10
Pitchfork Media	8.7/10
PopMatters	10/10 stars
Telegraph (UK)	4/5 stars

The Bootleg Series Vol. 12: The Cutting Edge 1965–1966 is a compilation album by the American singer-songwriter Bob Dylan, released on Legacy Records in November 2015. The tenth installment in the ongoing Bob Dylan Bootleg Series, it comprises recordings from 1965 and 1966, mostly unreleased demos and outtakes from recording sessions for his albums Bringing It All Back Home, Highway 61 Revisited and Blonde on Blonde. The standard set peaked at number 41 on the Billboard 200.

== Content ==
Three different versions of the set were released simultaneously: a two-disc 36-track Best of edition in the packaging and format standard to the rest of the series after the first installment; a six-disc 111-track box set Deluxe edition similar in packaging to its counterpart from the previous Bootleg set; and an 18-disc 379-track limited Collector's Edition available exclusively by order from Dylan's official website, which also came with nine mono vinyl singles reproducing ones released around the world by Columbia Records during this era. Only 5000 copies of this edition were produced, and it won the Grammy Award for Best Historical Album at the 59th Annual Grammy Awards presentation.

The Collector's Edition was unique as it included "...every note recorded during the 1965–1966 sessions, every alternate take and alternate lyric" on 17 discs, with an 18th disc of hotel room recordings of Dylan with Joan Baez or Robbie Robertson. All tracks on the standard two-disc Best of edition are also included in the Deluxe edition. Purchasers of the Collector's Edition were also offered 208 live recordings from 1965 as a free digital download.

== Title ==
The title of the set, “The Cutting Edge,” a hackneyed expression about being at the forefront of a movement, is used ironically by Dylan in his 2004 memoir Chronicles: Volume One when writing about the music scene of the late 1950s and early 1960s. He proleptically describes the era by alluding to the Rock Era that had not yet arrived:

[John Hammond] saw me as someone in the long line of a tradition, the tradition of blues, jazz and folk and not as some newfangled wunderkind on the cutting edge. Not that there was any cutting edge. Things were pretty sleepy on the Americana music scene in the late '50s and early '60s. Popular radio was sort of at a standstill and filled with empty pleasantries. It was years before The Beatles, The Who or The Rolling Stones would breathe new life and excitement into it.

He also uses it later in chapter 5, "River of Ice" when describing "Pirate Jenny":

I took the song apart and unzipped it -- it was the form, the free verse association, the structure and disregard for the known certainty of melodic patterns to make it seriously matter, give it its cutting edge.

== Singles reproductions ==
Duplicates of the following nine singles are included with the Collector's Edition:

- "Subterranean Homesick Blues" b/w "She Belongs to Me" (1965)
- "Like a Rolling Stone" b/w "Gates of Eden" (1965)
- "Positively 4th Street" b/w "From a Buick 6" (1965)
- "Can You Please Crawl Out Your Window?" b/w "Highway 61 Revisited" (1966)
- "One of Us Must Know (Sooner or Later)" b/w "Queen Jane Approximately" (1966)
- "Rainy Day Women #12 & 35" b/w "Pledging My Time" (1966)
- "I Want You" b/w "Just Like Tom Thumb's Blues (live)" (1966)
- "Just Like a Woman" b/w "Obviously 5 Believers" (1966)
- "Leopard-Skin Pill-Box Hat" b/w "Most Likely You Go Your Way And I'll Go Mine" (1967)

== Best of track listing ==
Disc one
No.	Title	Version	Length
1.	"Love Minus Zero/No Limit"	Take 2, Acoustic	3:11
2.	"I'll Keep It with Mine" (previously released on Biograph)	Take 1, Piano Demo	4:11
3.	"Bob Dylan's 115th Dream" (take 1 previously released on Bringing It All Back Home)	Takes 1 and 2, Solo Acoustic	6:17
4.	"She Belongs to Me"	Take 1, Solo Acoustic	2:57
5.	"Subterranean Homesick Blues"	Take 1, Alternate Take	2:38
6.	"Outlaw Blues"	Take 2, Alternate Take	3:29
7.	"On the Road Again"	Take 4, Alternate Take	2:31
8.	"Farewell, Angelina" (previously released on The Bootleg Series Volume 2)	Take 1, Solo Acoustic	5:28
9.	"If You Gotta Go, Go Now"	Take 2, Alternate Take	2:50
10.	"You Don't Have to Do That"	Take 1, Solo Acoustic	0:50
11.	"California"	Take 1, Solo Acoustic	3:05
12.	"Mr. Tambourine Man"	Take 3 with Band, Incomplete	3:23
13.	"It Takes a Lot to Laugh, It Takes a Train to Cry"	Take 8, Alternate Take	3:28
14.	"Like a Rolling Stone" (short version)	Take 5, Rehearsal	1:44
15.	"Like a Rolling Stone"	Take 11, Alternate Take	5:56
16.	"Sitting on a Barbed Wire Fence"	Take 2	3:58
17.	"Medicine Sunday"	Take 1	1:01
18.	"Desolation Row"	Take 2, Piano Demo	2:00
19.	"Desolation Row"	Take 1, Alternate Version	11:15
Total length:			70:12

Disc two
No.	Title	Version	Length
1.	"Tombstone Blues"	Take 1, Alternate Take	7:30
2.	"Positively 4th Street"	Take 5, Alternate Take	4:24
3.	"Can You Please Crawl Out Your Window?" (short version)	Take 1, Alternate Take	4:05
4.	"Just Like Tom Thumb's Blues"	Take 3, Rehearsal	5:39
5.	"Highway 61 Revisited"	Take 3, Alternate Take	3:30
6.	"Queen Jane Approximately"	Take 5, Alternate Take	6:02
7.	"Visions of Johanna"	Take 5, Rehearsal	7:40
8.	"She's Your Lover Now"	Take 6, Rehearsal	4:58
9.	"Lunatic Princess"	Take 1	1:20
10.	"Leopard-Skin Pill-Box Hat"	Take 8, Alternate Take	3:26
11.	"One of Us Must Know (Sooner or Later)"	Take 19, Alternate Take	5:10
12.	"Stuck Inside of Mobile with the Memphis Blues Again"	Take 13, Alternate Take	4:03
13.	"Absolutely Sweet Marie"	Take 1, Alternate Take	5:01
14.	"Just Like a Woman"	Take 4, Alternate Take	5:19
15.	"Pledging My Time"	Take 1, Alternate Take	3:22
16.	"I Want You"	Take 4, Alternate Take	2:51
17.	"Highway 61 Revisited"	Take 7, False Start	0:32
Total length:			74:52

== Deluxe edition track listing ==
Extended content

Disc one
No.	Title	Version	Length
1.	"Love Minus Zero/No Limit"	Take 1, Breakdown	1:34
2.	"Love Minus Zero/No Limit" (included on standard edition)	Take 2, Acoustic	3:11
3.	"Love Minus Zero/No Limit"	Take 3 Remake, Complete	3:42
4.	"Love Minus Zero/No Limit"	Take 1 Remake, Complete	2:43
5.	"I'll Keep it With Mine" (included on standard edition; previously released on Biograph)	Take 1, Piano Demo	4:12
6.	"It's All Over Now, Baby Blue" (previously released on The Bootleg Series Volume 7)	Take 1	3:34
7.	"Bob Dylan's 115th Dream" (included on standard edition; previously released on Bringing It All Back Home)	Take 1, Fragment	0:26
8.	"Bob Dylan's 115th Dream" (included on standard edition)	Take 2, Complete	5:50
9.	"She Belongs to Me" (included on standard edition)	Take 1, Solo Acoustic	2:59
10.	"She Belongs to Me" (previously released on The Bootleg Series Volume 7)	Take 2 Remake, Complete	3:21
11.	"She Belongs to Me"	Take 1 Remake, Complete	2:39
12.	"Subterranean Homesick Blues" (previously released on The Bootleg Series Volume 2)	Take 1	3:07
13.	"Subterranean Homesick Blues" (included on standard edition)	Take 1, Alternate Take	2:39
14.	"Outlaw Blues" (previously released on Exclusive Outtakes from No Direction Home)	Take 1, Complete	2:17
15.	"Outlaw Blues" (included on standard edition)	Take 2, Alternate Version	3:30
16.	"On the Road Again"	Take 1, Complete	3:21
17.	"On the Road Again" (included on standard edition)	Take 4, Alternate Take	2:31
18.	"On the Road Again"	Take 1 Remake, Complete	2:31
19.	"On the Road Again"	Take 7 Remake, Complete	2:48
20.	"Farewell, Angelina" (included on standard edition; previously released on The Bootleg Series Volume 2)	Take 1, Solo Acoustic	5:28
21.	"If You Gotta Go, Go Now"	Take 1, Complete	2:54
22.	"If You Gotta Go, Go Now" (included on standard edition)	Take 2, Alternate Take	2:50
23.	"You Don't Have to Do That" (included on standard edition)	Take 1, Solo Acoustic	0:48
Total length:			69:09

Disc two
No.	Title	Version	Length
1.	"California" (included on standard edition)	Take 1, Solo Acoustic	3:06
2.	"It's Alright, Ma (I'm Only Bleeding)"	Take 1, False Start	1:10
3.	"Mr. Tambourine Man"	Takes 1 and 2, False Starts	1:52
4.	"Mr. Tambourine Man" (included on standard edition)	Take 3 with Band, Incomplete	3:23
5.	"It Takes a Lot to Laugh, It Takes a Train to Cry"	Take 1, Complete	2:40
6.	"It Takes a Lot to Laugh, It Takes a Train to Cry" (included on standard edition)	Take 8, Alternate Version	3:29
7.	"It Takes a Lot to Laugh, It Takes a Train to Cry"	Take 3, Incomplete	3:13
8.	"It Takes a Lot to Laugh, It Takes a Train to Cry"	Take 3 Remake, Complete	3:42
9.	"Sitting on a Barbed Wire Fence" (included on standard edition)	Take 2	4:00
10.	"Tombstone Blues" (included on standard edition)	Take 1, Alternate Take	7:29
11.	"Tombstone Blues" (previously released on The Bootleg Series Volume 7)	Take 9	3:27
12.	"Positively 4th Street"	Takes 1, 2 and 3, False Starts	0:56
13.	"Positively 4th Street"	Take 4, Complete	4:24
14.	"Positively 4th Street" (included on standard edition)	Take 5, Alternate Take	4:24
15.	"Desolation Row" (included on standard edition)	Take 1, Alternate Take	11:17
16.	"Desolation Row" (included on standard edition)	Take 2, Piano Demo	2:01
17.	"Desolation Row"	Take 5, Remake, Complete	10:51
18.	"From a Buick 6"	Take 1, False Start	0:23
19.	"From a Buick 6" (accidentally released on the first pressing of Highway 61 Revisited)	Take 4	3:10
Total length:			75:07

Disc three
No.	Title	Version	Length
1.	"Like a Rolling Stone"	Takes 1, 2 and 3, Rehearsal	5:48
2.	"Like a Rolling Stone" (previously released on The Bootleg Series Volume 2)	Take 4, Rehearsal	1:39
3.	"Like a Rolling Stone" (edited version included on standard edition)	Take 5, Rehearsal	2:17
4.	"Like a Rolling Stone"	Rehearsal Remake	2:33
5.	"Like a Rolling Stone"	Take 1 Remake, Rehearsal	1:57
6.	"Like a Rolling Stone"	Takes 2 and 3 Remakes, Rehearsal	0:35
7.	"Like a Rolling Stone" (previously released as Columbia single 43346)	Take 4 Remake	6:28
8.	"Like a Rolling Stone"	Take 5 Remake, Rehearsal	1:54
9.	"Like a Rolling Stone"	Take 6 Remake, False Start	0:21
10.	"Like a Rolling Stone"	Take 8 Remake, Breakdown	4:18
11.	"Like a Rolling Stone"	Takes 9 and 10 Remake, False Starts	0:35
12.	"Like a Rolling Stone" (included on standard edition)	Take 11, Alternate Take	5:57
13.	"Like a Rolling Stone"	Take 12 Remake, False Start	0:10
14.	"Like a Rolling Stone"	Take 13 Remake, Breakdown	1:36
15.	"Like a Rolling Stone"	Take 14 Remake, False Start	0:23
16.	"Like a Rolling Stone"	Take 15 Remake, Breakdown	3:08
17.	"Like a Rolling Stone"	Master Take, guitar (Bloomfield)	6:25
18.	"Like a Rolling Stone"	Master Take, vocals and guitar (Dylan)	6:25
19.	"Like a Rolling Stone"	Master Take, piano and bass	6:25
20.	"Like a Rolling Stone"	Master Take, drums, organ and tambourine	6:27
Total length:			65:21

Disc four
No.	Title	Version	Length
1.	"Can You Please Crawl Out Your Window?" (edited version included on standard edition)	Take 1, Alternate Take	4:39
2.	"Can You Please Crawl Out Your Window?" (accidentally released as b-side to first pressing of "Positively 4th Street" single)	Take 17	4:01
3.	"Highway 61 Revisited" (included on standard edition)	Take 3, Alternate Take	3:30
4.	"Highway 61 Revisited"	Take 5, Complete	3:40
5.	"Highway 61 Revisited" (included on standard edition)	Take 7, False Start	0:33
6.	"Just Like Tom Thumb's Blues"	Take 1, Breakdown	1:09
7.	"Just Like Tom Thumb's Blues" (included on standard edition)	Take 3, Rehearsal	5:39
8.	"Just Like Tom Thumb's Blues"	Take 13, Complete	5:29
9.	"Queen Jane Approximately"	Take 2, Complete	5:19
10.	"Queen Jane Approximately" (included on standard edition)	Take 5, Alternate Take	6:02
11.	"Ballad of a Thin Man"	Take 2, Breakdown	3:53
12.	"Medicine Sunday" (included on standard edition)	Take 1	1:02
13.	"Jet Pilot" (previously released on Biograph)	Take 1	1:27
14.	"I Wanna Be Your Lover"	Take 1, Fragment	1:07
15.	"I Wanna Be Your Lover"	Take 6, Complete	3:30
16.	"Instrumental"	Take 2, Complete	4:03
17.	"Can You Please Crawl Out Your Window"	Take 6, Complete	3:48
18.	"Visions of Johanna"	Take 1, Rehearsal	1:43
19.	"Visions of Johanna" (included on standard edition)	Take 5, Rehearsal	7:38
Total length:			68:12

Disc five
No.	Title	Version	Length
1.	"Visions of Johanna"	Take 7, Complete	9:08
2.	"Visions of Johanna" (previously released on The Bootleg Series Volume 7)	Take 8	7:05
3.	"Visions of Johanna"	Take 14, Complete	7:32
4.	"She's Your Lover Now"	Take 1, Breakdown	3:02
5.	"She's Your Lover Now" (included on standard edition)	Take 6, Rehearsal	4:59
6.	"She's Your Lover Now" (previously released on The Bootleg Series Volume 2)	Take 15	6:24
7.	"She's Your Lover Now"	Take 16, Complete	8:27
8.	"One of Us Must Know (Sooner or Later)"	Take 2, Rehearsal	2:16
9.	"One of Us Must Know (Sooner or Later)"	Take 4, Rehearsal	1:54
10.	"One of Us Must Know (Sooner or Later)" (included on standard edition)	Take 19, Alternate Take	5:11
11.	"Lunatic Princess" (included on standard edition)	Take 1	1:20
12.	"4th Time Around"	Take 11, Complete	4:26
13.	"Leopard-Skin Pill-Box Hat"	Take 3, Complete	4:27
14.	"Leopard-Skin Pill-Box Hat" (included on standard edition)	Take 8, Alternate Take	3:26
15.	"Rainy Day Women #12 & 35" (edit without rehearsal previously released as Columbia single 43592)	Take 1, Rehearsal and Finished Track	6:17
Total length:			75:54

Disc six
No.	Title	Version	Length
1.	"Stuck Inside of Mobile with the Memphis Blues Again"	Take 1, Rehearsal	3:23
2.	"Stuck Inside of Mobile with the Memphis Blues Again"	Rehearsal	4:54
3.	"Stuck Inside of Mobile with the Memphis Blues Again" (previously released on The Bootleg Series Volume 7)	Take 5	5:52
4.	"Stuck Inside of Mobile with the Memphis Blues Again" (included on standard edition)	Take 13, Alternate Take	4:09
5.	"Stuck Inside of Mobile with the Memphis Blues Again"	Take 14, Complete	7:04
6.	"Absolutely Sweet Marie" (included on standard edition)	Take 1, Alternate Take	5:02
7.	"Just Like a Woman"	Take 1, Complete	4:32
8.	"Just Like a Woman" (included on standard edition)	Take 4, Alternate Take	5:20
9.	"Just Like a Woman"	Take 8, Complete	5:22
10.	"Pledging My Time" (included on standard edition)	Take 1, Alternate Take	3:26
11.	"Most Likely You Go Your Way and I'll Go Mine"	Take 1, Complete	3:38
12.	"Temporary Like Achilles"	Take 3, Complete	5:43
13.	"Obviously Five Believers"	Take 3, Complete	3:47
14.	"I Want You" (included on standard edition)	Take 4, Alternate Take	2:52
15.	"Sad Eyed Lady of the Lowlands"	Take 1, Complete	10:06
Total length:			75:09 418:27

== Collector's edition track listing ==
Extended content

Disc one
No.	Title	Version	Length
1.	"Love Minus Zero/No Limit" (included on deluxe edition)	Take 1 (1/13/1965) Breakdown	1:34
2.	"Love Minus Zero/No Limit" (included on standard edition)	Take 2 (1/13/1965) Complete	3:11
3.	"I’ll Keep It with Mine" (included on standard edition)	Take 1 (1/13/1965) Released on Biograph, 1985	4:11
4.	"It’s All Over Now, Baby Blue" (included on deluxe edition)	Take 1 (1/13/1965) Released on The Bootleg Series, Vol. 7, 2005	3:34
5.	"Bob Dylan’s 115th Dream" (included on standard edition)	Take 1 (1/13/1965) Fragment. Released on Bringing It All Back Home, 1965	0:26
6.	"Bob Dylan’s 115th Dream" (included on standard edition)	Take 2 (1/13/1965) Complete	5:50
7.	"She Belongs to Me" (included on standard edition)	Take 1 (1/13/1965) Complete	2:58
8.	"Subterranean Homesick Blues" (included on deluxe edition)	Take 1 (1/13/1965) Released on The Bootleg Series, Vol. 2, 1991	3:08
9.	"Outlaw Blues" (included on deluxe edition)	Take 1 (1/13/1965) Complete	2:16
10.	"On the Road Again" (included on deluxe edition)	Take 1 (1/13/1965) Complete	3:21
11.	"Farewell Angelina" (included on standard edition)	Take 1 (1/13/1965) Released on The Bootleg Series, Vol. 2, 1991	5:29
12.	"If You Gotta Go, Go Now" (included on deluxe edition)	Take 1 (1/13/1965) Complete	2:54
13.	"You Don’t Have to Do That" (included on standard edition)	Take 1 (1/13/1965) Incomplete	0:51
14.	"California" (included on standard edition)	Take 1 (1/13/1965) Complete	3:06
15.	"Love Minus Zero/No Limit" (included on deluxe edition)	Take 3 Remake (1/13/1965) Complete	3:41
16.	"She Belongs to Me" (included on deluxe edition)	Take 2 Remake (1/13/1965) Complete Released on The Bootleg Series, Vol. 7, 2005	3:20
17.	"Outlaw Blues"	Take 1 Remake (1/13/1965) False start	0:28
18.	"Outlaw Blues" (included on standard edition)	Take 2 Remake (1/13/1965) Complete	3:29
19.	"Love Minus Zero/No Limit" (included on deluxe edition)	Take 1 Remake (1/14/1965) Complete	2:43
20.	"Love Minus Zero/No Limit"	Take 2 Remake (1/14/1965) Released on Bringing It All Back Home, 1965	2:58
21.	"Love Minus Zero/No Limit"	(1/14/1965) Insert	1:52
22.	"Subterranean Homesick Blues" (included on standard edition)	Take 1 Remake (1/14/1965) Complete	2:39
23.	"Subterranean Homesick Blues"	Take 2 Remake (1/14/1965) False start	0:24
24.	"Subterranean Homesick Blues"	Take 3 Remake (1/14/1965) Released on Bringing It All Back Home, 1965	2:28
25.	"Outlaw Blues"	Take 1 Remake (1/14/1965) False start	0:31
26.	"Outlaw Blues"	Take 2 Remake (1/14/1965) Fragment/breakdown	1:00
27.	"Outlaw Blues"	Take 3 Remake (1/14/1965) Released on Bringing It All Back Home, 1965	3:10
Total length:			71:45

Disc two
No.	Title	Version	Length
1.	"She Belongs to Me" (included on deluxe edition)	Take 1 Remake (1/14/1965) Complete	2:49
2.	"She Belongs to Me"	Take 2 Remake (1/14/1965) Released on Bringing It All Back Home, 1965	2:49
3.	"Bob Dylan’s 115th Dream"	Take 1 (1/14/1965) False start	0:07
4.	"Bob Dylan’s 115th Dream"	Take 2 (1/14/1965) Released on Bringing It All Back Home, 1965	6:08
5.	"On the Road Again"	Take 1 (1/14/1965) False start	0:27
6.	"On the Road Again"	Take 2 (1/14/1965) Complete	2:54
7.	"On the Road Again"	Take 3 (1/14/1965) False start	0:43
8.	"On the Road Again" (included on standard edition)	Take 4 (1/14/1965) Complete	2:32
9.	"Maggie’s Farm"	Take 1 (1/15/1965) Released on Bringing It All Back Home, 1965	4:01
10.	"On the Road Again" (included on deluxe edition)	Take 1 Remake (1/15/1965) Complete	2:31
11.	"On the Road Again"	Takes 2–6 Remake (1/15/1965) False starts/complete	2:47
12.	"On the Road Again" (included on deluxe edition)	Take 7 Remake (1/15/1965) Complete	2:49
13.	"On the Road Again"	Takes 8–9 Remake (1/15/1965) False starts	0:38
14.	"On the Road Again"	Take 11 Remake (1/15/1965) False start	0:45
15.	"On the Road Again"	Take 12 Remake (1/15/1965) False start	0:16
16.	"On the Road Again"	Take 13 Remake (1/15/1965) Released on Bringing It All Back Home, 1965	2:39
17.	"It’s Alright, Ma (I’m Only Bleeding)" (included on deluxe edition)	Take 1 (1/15/1965) False start	1:10
18.	"It’s Alright, Ma (I’m Only Bleeding)"	Take 2 (1/15/1965) Released on Bringing It All Back Home, 1965	7:32
19.	"Gates of Eden"	Take 1 (1/15/1965) Released on Bringing It All Back Home, 1965	5:44
20.	"Mr. Tambourine Man" (included on deluxe edition)	Takes 1–2 (1/15/1965) False starts	1:51
21.	"Mr. Tambourine Man" (included on standard edition)	Take 3 (1/15/1965) Breakdown	3:24
22.	"Mr. Tambourine Man"	Takes 4–5 (1/15/1965) Breakdown	0:28
23.	"Mr. Tambourine Man"	Take 6 (1/15/1965) Released on Bringing It All Back Home, 1965	5:55
24.	"It’s All Over Now, Baby Blue"	Take 1 Remake (1/15/1965) Released on Bringing It All Back Home, 1965	4:14
Total length:			65:23

Disc three
No.	Title	Version	Length
1.	"If You Gotta Go, Go Now"	Take 1 (1/15/1965) Complete	2:50
2.	"If You Gotta Go, Go Now" (included on standard edition)	Take 2 (1/15/1965) Complete	2:50
3.	"If You Gotta Go, Go Now"	Take 3 (1/15/1965) Complete	3:12
4.	"If You Gotta Go, Go Now"	Take 4 (1/15/1965) Released on The Bootleg Series, Vol. 2, 1991	2:56
5.	"It Takes a Lot to Laugh, It Takes a Train to Cry" (included on deluxe edition)	Take 1 (6/15/1965) Complete	2:40
6.	"It Takes a Lot to Laugh, It Takes a Train to Cry"	Takes 2–3 (6/15/1965) Fragments	0:18
7.	"It Takes a Lot to Laugh, It Takes a Train to Cry"	Take 4 (6/15/1965) Breakdown	1:53
8.	"It Takes a Lot to Laugh, It Takes a Train to Cry"	Take 5 (6/15/1965) False start	0:17
9.	"It Takes a Lot to Laugh, It Takes a Train to Cry"	Take 6 (6/15/1965) Breakdown	1:46
10.	"It Takes a Lot to Laugh, It Takes a Train to Cry"	Take 7 (6/15/1965) Insert	0:57
11.	"It Takes a Lot to Laugh, It Takes a Train to Cry" (included on standard edition)	Take 8 (6/15/1965) Complete	3:29
12.	"It Takes a Lot to Laugh, It Takes a Train to Cry"	Take 9 (6/15/1965) Released on The Bootleg Series, Vol. 7, 2005	3:42
13.	"Sitting on a Barbed-Wire Fence"	Take 1 (6/15/1965) Rehearsal and breakdown	1:25
14.	"Sitting on a Barbed-Wire Fence" (included on standard edition)	Take 2 (6/15/1965) Complete	3:59
15.	"Sitting on a Barbed-Wire Fence"	Take 3 (6/15/1965) Released on The Bootleg Series, Vol. 2, 1991	5:29
16.	"Sitting on a Barbed-Wire Fence"	Take 2 (6/15/1965) Edited version. Complete	3:54
17.	"It Takes a Lot to Laugh, It Takes a Train to Cry"	Take 1 Remake (6/15/1965) Released on The Bootleg Series, Vol. 2, 1991	3:30
18.	"Sitting on a Barbed-Wire Fence"	Takes 4–5 (6/15/1965) False starts	0:41
19.	"Sitting on a Barbed-Wire Fence"	Take 6 (6/15/1965) Complete	4:52
20.	"Like a Rolling Stone" (included on deluxe edition)	Takes 1–3 (6/15/1965) Rehearsal	5:50
21.	"Like a Rolling Stone" (included on deluxe edition)	Take 4 (6/15/1965) Rehearsal. Partially released on The Bootleg Series, Vol. 2, 1991	2:56
22.	"Like a Rolling Stone" (edited version included on standard edition; included on deluxe edition)	Take 5 (6/15/1965) Breakdown	2:16
Total length:			61:54

Disc four
No.	Title	Version	Length
1.	"Like a Rolling Stone" (included on deluxe edition)	Rehearsal Remake (6/16/1965) Rehearsal	2:33
2.	"Like a Rolling Stone" (included on deluxe edition)	Takes 1 Remake (6/16/1965) Rehearsal	1:57
3.	"Like a Rolling Stone" (included on deluxe edition)	Takes 2–3 Remake (6/16/1965) False Starts	0:35
4.	"Like a Rolling Stone" (included on deluxe edition; previously released as Columbia single 43346)	Take 4 Remake (6/16/1965) Released on Highway 61 Revisited, 1965	6:28
5.	"Like a Rolling Stone" (included on deluxe edition)	Take 5 Remake (6/16/1965) Rehearsal	1:54
6.	"Like a Rolling Stone" (included on deluxe edition)	Take 6 Remake (6/16/1965) False Start	0:21
7.	"Like a Rolling Stone" (included on deluxe edition)	Take 8 Remake (6/16/1965) Breakdown	4:19
8.	"Like a Rolling Stone" (included on deluxe edition)	Takes 9–10 Remake (6/16/1965) False Starts	0:35
9.	"Like a Rolling Stone" (included on standard edition)	Take 11 Remake (6/16/1965) Complete	5:57
10.	"Like a Rolling Stone" (included on deluxe edition)	Take 12 Remake (6/16/1965) False Start	0:10
11.	"Like a Rolling Stone" (included on deluxe edition)	Take 13 Remake (6/16/1965) Breakdown	1:36
12.	"Like a Rolling Stone" (included on deluxe edition)	Take 14 Remake (6/16/1965) False Start	0:23
13.	"Like a Rolling Stone" (included on deluxe edition)	Take 15 Remake (6/16/1965) Breakdown	3:08
14.	"Like a Rolling Stone" (included on deluxe edition)	(6/16/1965) Master Take guitar Bloomfield	6:25
15.	"Like a Rolling Stone" (included on deluxe edition)	(6/16/1965) Master Take vocal, guitar (Dylan)	6:25
16.	"Like a Rolling Stone" (included on deluxe edition)	(6/16/1965) Master Take piano and bass	6:25
17.	"Like a Rolling Stone" (included on deluxe edition)	(6/16/1965) Master Take drums, organ, and tambourine	6:27
Total length:			55:47

Disc five
No.	Title	Version	Length
1.	"It Takes a Lot to Laugh, It Takes a Train to Cry"	Take 1 (7/29/1965) Breakdown	1:51
2.	"It Takes a Lot to Laugh, It Takes a Train to Cry"	Take 2 (7/29/1965) False start	0:24
3.	"It Takes a Lot to Laugh, It Takes a Train to Cry" (included on deluxe edition)	Take 3 (7/29/1965) Incomplete	3:12
4.	"Tombstone Blues" (included on standard edition)	Take 1 (7/29/1965) Complete	7:29
5.	"Tombstone Blues"	Takes 2–3 (7/29/1965) False starts	1:16
6.	"Tombstone Blues"	Take 4 (7/29/1965) Complete	6:59
7.	"Tombstone Blues"	Takes 5–7 (7/29/1965) False starts, rehearsal	1:54
8.	"Tombstone Blues" (included on deluxe edition)	Take 9 (7/29/1965) Released on The Bootleg Series, Vol. 7, 2005	3:36
9.	"Tombstone Blues"	Take 10 (7/29/1965) False start	0:24
10.	"Tombstone Blues"	Take 11 (7/29/1965) Breakdown	3:15
11.	"Tombstone Blues"	Take 12 (7/29/1965) Released on Highway 61 Revisited, 1965	6:12
12.	"It Takes a Lot to Laugh, It Takes a Train to Cry"	Take 1 (7/29/1965) Complete	3:51
13.	"It Takes a Lot to Laugh, It Takes a Train to Cry"	Take 2 (7/29/1965) False start	0:24
14.	"It Takes a Lot to Laugh, It Takes a Train to Cry" (included on deluxe edition)	Take 3 (7/29/1965) Complete	3:42
15.	"It Takes a Lot to Laugh, It Takes a Train to Cry"	Take 4 (7/29/1965) Released on Highway 61 Revisited, 1965	4:14
16.	"Positively 4th Street" (included on deluxe edition)	Takes 1–3 (7/29/1965) False starts	0:57
17.	"Positively 4th Street" (included on deluxe edition)	Take 4 (7/29/1965) Complete	4:24
18.	"Positively 4th Street" (included on standard edition)	Take 5 (7/29/1965) Complete	4:25
19.	"Positively 4th Street"	Take 6 (7/29/1965) Breakdown	0:52
20.	"Positively 4th Street"	Take 7 (7/29/1965) Breakdown	1:13
21.	"Positively 4th Street"	Take 8 (7/29/1965) Breakdown	2:55
22.	"Positively 4th Street"	Take 10 (7/29/1965) Breakdown	1:02
23.	"Positively 4th Street"	Take 12 (7/29/1965) Released as a single, 1965	4:23
Total length:			69:03

Disc six
No.	Title	Version	Length
1.	"Desolation Row"	Take 1 (7/29/1965) Released on The Bootleg Series, Vol. 7, 2005	11:47
2.	"From a Buick 6" (included on deluxe edition)	Take 1 (7/30/1965) False start	0:23
3.	"From a Buick 6"	Take 2 (7/30/1965) False start	0:16
4.	"From a Buick 6" (included on deluxe edition)	Take 4 (7/30/1965) Accidentally released on the first pressing of Highway 61 Revisited, 1965	3:12
5.	"From a Buick 6"	Take 5 (7/30/1965) Released on Highway 61 Revisited, 1965	3:41
6.	"Can You Please Crawl Out Your Window?"	Takes 1–4 (7/30/1965) False starts	1:41
7.	"Can You Please Crawl Out Your Window?" (edited version included on standard edition; included on deluxe edition)	Take 1 (7/30/1965) Complete	4:38
8.	"Can You Please Crawl Out Your Window?"	Take 2 (7/30/1965) False start	0:35
9.	"Can You Please Crawl Out Your Window?"	Take 3 (7/30/1965) Complete	4:10
10.	"Can You Please Crawl Out Your Window?"	Take 4 (7/30/1965) False start	0:26
11.	"Can You Please Crawl Out Your Window?"	Take 5 (7/30/1965) Complete	4:08
12.	"Can You Please Crawl Out Your Window?"	Take 6 (7/30/1965) Rehearsal/false start	1:02
13.	"Can You Please Crawl Out Your Window?"	Take 7 (7/30/1965) False start	0:26
14.	"Can You Please Crawl Out Your Window?"	Take 8 (7/30/1965) False start	0:43
15.	"Can You Please Crawl Out Your Window?"	Takes 10–11 (7/30/1965) False starts	0:49
16.	"Can You Please Crawl Out Your Window?"	Take 12 (7/30/1965) Complete	3:48
17.	"Can You Please Crawl Out Your Window?"	Take 14 (7/30/1965) Breakdown	1:05
18.	"Can You Please Crawl Out Your Window?"	Take 15 (7/30/1965) Breakdown	2:49
19.	"Can You Please Crawl Out Your Window?" (included on deluxe edition)	Take 17 (7/30/1965) Accidentally Released as B-side of first pressing of "Positively 4th Street" single	4:00
20.	"Highway 61 Revisited"	Take 1 (8/02/1965) False start	0:22
21.	"Highway 61 Revisited"	Take 2 (8/02/1965) False start	0:28
22.	"Highway 61 Revisited" (included on standard edition)	Take 3 (8/02/1965) Complete	3:30
23.	"Highway 61 Revisited"	Take 4 (8/02/1965) False start	0:08
24.	"Highway 61 Revisited" (included on deluxe edition)	Take 5 (8/02/1965) Complete	3:40
25.	"Highway 61 Revisited"	Take 5 (mis-slate) (8/02/1965) Complete	3:19
26.	"Highway 61 Revisited"	Take 6 (8/02/1965) Released on The Bootleg Series, Vol. 7, 2005	3:38
27.	"Highway 61 Revisited" (included on standard edition)	Take 7 (8/02/1965) False start	0:34
28.	"Highway 61 Revisited"	Take 8 (8/02/1965) False start	0:27
29.	"Highway 61 Revisited"	Take 9 (8/02/1965) Released on Highway 61 Revisited, 1965	3:34
Total length:			69:34

Disc seven
No.	Title	Version	Length
1.	"Just Like Tom Thumb’s Blues" (included on deluxe edition)	Take 1 (8/02/1965) Breakdown	1:09
2.	"Just Like Tom Thumb’s Blues" (included on standard edition)	Take 3 (8/02/1965) Complete	5:39
3.	"Just Like Tom Thumb’s Blues"	Take 4 (8/02/1965) Rehearsal	0:20
4.	"Just Like Tom Thumb’s Blues"	Take 5 (8/02/1965) Released on The Bootleg Series, Vol. 7, 2005	5:45
5.	"Just Like Tom Thumb’s Blues"	Takes 9–10 (8/02/1965) Breakdown	1:14
6.	"Just Like Tom Thumb’s Blues"	Takes 11–12 (8/02/1965) False starts	0:23
7.	"Just Like Tom Thumb’s Blues" (included on deluxe edition)	Take 13 (8/02/1965) Complete	5:28
8.	"Just Like Tom Thumb’s Blues"	Takes 14–15 (8/02/1965) False starts	0:42
9.	"Just Like Tom Thumb’s Blues"	Take 16 (8/02/1965) Released on Highway 61 Revisited, 1965	5:34
10.	"Queen Jane Approximately"	Take 1 (8/02/1965) Rehearsal	0:24
11.	"Queen Jane Approximately" (included on deluxe edition)	Take 2 (8/02/1965) Complete	5:19
12.	"Queen Jane Approximately"	Take 3 (8/02/1965) False start	0:45
13.	"Queen Jane Approximately"	Take 4 (8/02/1965) False start	0:08
14.	"Queen Jane Approximately" (included on standard edition)	Take 5 (8/02/1965) Complete	6:02
15.	"Queen Jane Approximately"	Take 6 (8/02/1965) Complete	5:28
16.	"Queen Jane Approximately"	Take 7 (8/02/1965) Released on Highway 61 Revisited, 1965	5:24
17.	"Ballad of a Thin Man"	Take 1 (8/02/1965) False start	0:42
18.	"Ballad of a Thin Man" (included on deluxe edition)	Take 2 (8/02/1965) Breakdown	3:53
19.	"Ballad of a Thin Man"	Take 3 (8/02/1965) Released on Highway 61 Revisited, 1965	5:56
20.	"Ballad of a Thin Man"	Take 4 (8/02/1965) Insert	1:00
Total length:			61:26

Disc eight
No.	Title	Version	Length
1.	"Desolation Row"	Takes 1–2 Remake (8/02/1965) False start/breakdown	0:41
2.	"Desolation Row"	Take 3 Remake (8/02/1965) Breakdown	1:56
3.	"Desolation Row"	Take 4 Remake (8/02/1965) False start	0:17
4.	"Desolation Row" (included on deluxe edition)	Take 5 Remake (8/02/1965) Complete	10:51
5.	"Tombstone Blues"	Take 1 (8/03/1965) Complete. Vocal overdub	2:47
6.	"Tombstone Blues"	Take 2 (8/03/1965) Complete. Vocal overdub	6:06
7.	"Tombstone Blues"	Take 3 (8/03/1965) Complete. Vocal overdub	6:06
8.	"Desolation Row"	Take 1 (8/04/1965) Rehearsal	1:11
9.	"Desolation Row" (included on standard edition)	Take 2 (8/04/1965) Rehearsal	2:01
10.	"Desolation Row" (included on standard edition)	Take 1 (8/04/1965) Complete (with insert)	11:17
11.	"Desolation Row"	Take 5 (8/04/1965) Complete master w/o acoustic guitar overdub. Released on Highway 61 Revisited, 1965	11:18
12.	"Desolation Row"	Take 6 (8/04/1965) Guitar overdub	11:18
13.	"Desolation Row"	Take 7 (8/04/1965) Guitar overdub	0:11
14.	"Tombstone Blues"	Take 1 (8/04/1965) Harmonica overdub	1:04
15.	"Medicine Sunday" (included on standard edition)	Take 1 (10/05/1965) Incomplete	1:02
16.	"Medicine Sunday"	Take 2 (10/05/1965) Incomplete	0:59
17.	"Jet Pilot" (included on deluxe edition)	Take 1 (10/05/1965) Released on Biograph, 1985	1:27
18.	"I Wanna Be Your Lover"	(10/05/1965) Rehearsal	5:32
19.	"Can You Please Crawl Out Your Window?"	Take 1 (10/05/1965) Fragment	0:57
20.	"Can You Please Crawl Out Your Window?"	Take 2 (10/05/1965) Fragment	1:21
Total length:			78:32

Disc nine
No.	Title	Version	Length
1.	"I Wanna Be Your Lover" (included on deluxe edition)	Take 1 (10/05/1965) Fragment	1:06
2.	"I Wanna Be Your Lover"	Take 1 Edit 1 (10/05/1965) Complete	1:47
3.	"I Wanna Be Your Lover"	Take 1 Edit 2 (10/05/1965) Complete	2:10
4.	"I Wanna Be Your Lover"	Take 2 (10/05/1965) Complete	2:02
5.	"I Wanna Be Your Lover"	(10/05/1965) Rehearsal	1:41
6.	"I Wanna Be Your Lover"	Take 3 10/05/1965) Complete	2:46
7.	"I Wanna Be Your Lover"	Take 4 (10/05/1965) Complete	2:50
8.	"I Wanna Be Your Lover"	Take 5 (10/05/1965) Complete	3:37
9.	"I Wanna Be Your Lover" (included on deluxe edition)	Take 6 (10/05/1965) Complete	3:30
10.	"I Wanna Be Your Lover"	Take 6 (mis-slate) (10/05/1965) Released on Biograph, 1985	3:30
11.	"Instrumental"	Take 1 (10/05/1965) Fragment	0:07
12.	"Instrumental" (included on deluxe edition)	Take 2 (10/05/1965) Complete	4:03
13.	"Visions of Johanna" (included on deluxe edition)	Take 1 (11/30/1965) Rehearsal	1:43
14.	"Visions of Johanna"	Take 2 (11/30/1965) Rehearsal	1:57
15.	"Visions of Johanna"	Take 3 (11/30/1965) Rehearsal	2:52
16.	"Visions of Johanna"	Take 4 (11/30/1965) Complete	7:43
17.	"Visions of Johanna" (included on standard edition)	Take 5 (11/30/1965) Complete	7:41
18.	"Visions of Johanna"	Take 6 (11/30/1965) Rehearsal	1:56
19.	"Visions of Johanna" (included on deluxe edition)	Take 7 (11/30/1965) Complete	9:10
20.	"Visions of Johanna" (included on deluxe edition)	Take 8 (11/30/1965) Released on The Bootleg Series, Vol. 7, 2005	7:04
Total length:			69:22

Disc ten
No.	Title	Version	Length
1.	"Visions of Johanna"	Takes 9–12 (11/30/1965) False starts	2:17
2.	"Visions of Johanna"	Take 13 (11/30/1965) Breakdown	1:30
3.	"Visions of Johanna" (included on deluxe edition)	Take 14 (11/30/1965) Complete	7:32
4.	"Can You Please Crawl Out Your Window?"	Take 1 (11/30/1965) False start	0:12
5.	"Can You Please Crawl Out Your Window?"	Take 2 (11/30/1965) False start, rehearsal	1:15
6.	"Can You Please Crawl Out Your Window?"	Take 3 (11/30/1965) False start	0:14
7.	"Can You Please Crawl Out Your Window?"	Take 4 (11/30/1965) False start, rehearsal	1:34
8.	"Can You Please Crawl Out Your Window?" (included on deluxe edition)	Take 6 (11/30/1965) Complete	3:48
9.	"Can You Please Crawl Out Your Window?"	Take 7 (11/30/1965) Breakdown	0:42
10.	"Can You Please Crawl Out Your Window?"	Take 8 (11/30/1965) Complete	3:49
11.	"Can You Please Crawl Out Your Window?"	Take 9 (11/30/1965) False start	0:14
12.	"Can You Please Crawl Out Your Window?"	Take 10 (11/30/1965) Released as a single in December, 1965	3:57
13.	"She’s Your Lover Now" (included on deluxe edition)	Take 1 (1/21/1966) Breakdown	3:00
14.	"She’s Your Lover Now"	Take 2 (1/21/1966) Rehearsal	0:16
15.	"She’s Your Lover Now"	Take 3 (1/21/1966) Breakdown	1:00
16.	"She’s Your Lover Now"	Take 4 (1/21/1966) Incomplete	4:44
17.	"She’s Your Lover Now"	Take 5 (1/21/1966) Rehearsal	1:48
18.	"She’s Your Lover Now" (included on standard edition)	Take 6 (1/21/1966) Complete	4:59
19.	"She’s Your Lover Now"	Take 7 (1/21/1966) False start	1:18
20.	"She’s Your Lover Now"	Take 8 (1/21/1966) Rehearsal	1:04
21.	"She’s Your Lover Now"	Take 9 (1/21/1966) Rehearsal	1:31
22.	"She’s Your Lover Now"	Takes 10–11 (1/21/1966) Rehearsal	11:28
23.	"She’s Your Lover Now"	Take 12 (1/21/1966) Rehearsal	2:51
24.	"She’s Your Lover Now"	Take 13 (1/21/1966) Rehearsal	2:56
Total length:			64:10

Disc eleven
No.	Title	Version	Length
1.	"She’s Your Lover Now"	Take 14 (1/21/1966) Breakdown	3:13
2.	"She’s Your Lover Now" (included on deluxe edition)	Take 15 (1/21/1966) Released on The Bootleg Series, Vol. 2, 1991	6:24
3.	"She’s Your Lover Now"	(1/21/1966) Rehearsal	3:55
4.	"She’s Your Lover Now" (included on deluxe edition)	Take 16 (1/21/1966) Complete	9:04
5.	"Leopard-Skin Pill-Box Hat"	Take 1 (1/25/1966) Released on The Bootleg Series, Vol. 7, 2005	6:23
6.	"Leopard-Skin Pill-Box Hat"	Take 2 (1/25/1966) Complete	4:15
7.	"One of Us Must Know (Sooner or Later)"	Take 1 (1/25/1966) Rehearsal	4:11
8.	"One of Us Must Know (Sooner or Later)" (included on deluxe edition)	Take 2 (1/25/1966) Rehearsal	2:17
9.	"One of Us Must Know (Sooner or Later)"	Take 3 (1/25/1966) Fragment	0:27
10.	"One of Us Must Know (Sooner or Later)" (included on deluxe edition)	Take 4 (1/25/1966) Rehearsal	1:54
11.	"One of Us Must Know (Sooner or Later)"	Take 5 (1/25/1966) Rehearsal	2:04
12.	"One of Us Must Know (Sooner or Later)"	Takes 6–8 (1/25/1966) Rehearsal	1:43
13.	"One of Us Must Know (Sooner or Later)"	Take 9 (1/25/1966) Rehearsal	2:56
14.	"One of Us Must Know (Sooner or Later)"	Takes 10–14 (1/25/1966) Rehearsal	2:45
15.	"One of Us Must Know (Sooner or Later)"	Take 15 (1/25/1966) Complete	5:51
16.	"One of Us Must Know (Sooner or Later)"	Takes 16–17 (1/25/1966) False starts	0:35
17.	"One of Us Must Know (Sooner or Later)"	Take 18 (1/25/1966) Complete	5:47
18.	"One of Us Must Know (Sooner or Later)"	(1/25/1966) Rehearsal	1:50
19.	"One of Us Must Know (Sooner or Later)" (included on standard edition)	Take 19 (1/25/1966) Complete	5:11
20.	"One of Us Must Know (Sooner or Later)"	Takes 21–22 (1/25/1966) Breakdown	1:50
Total length:			72:45

Disc twelve
No.	Title	Version	Length
1.	"One of Us Must Know (Sooner or Later)"	Take 23 (1/25/1966) Complete	5:11
2.	"One of Us Must Know (Sooner or Later)"	Take 24 (1/25/1966) Released on Blonde On Blonde, 1966	4:58
3.	"One of Us Must Know (Sooner or Later)"	(1/25/1966) Master take, guitar (Dylan) and organ	4:58
4.	"One of Us Must Know (Sooner or Later)"	(1/25/1966) Master take, vocal	4:58
5.	"One of Us Must Know (Sooner or Later)"	(1/25/1966) Master take, piano and drums	4:58
6.	"One of Us Must Know (Sooner or Later)"	(1/25/1966) Master take, guitar and bass	4:57
7.	"Lunatic Princess" (included on standard edition)	Take 1 (1/27/1966) Incomplete	1:20
8.	"Leopard-Skin Pill-Box Hat"	Takes 1–2 (1/27/1966) False start, incomplete	3:01
9.	"Leopard-Skin Pill-Box Hat"	(1/27/1966) Insert	1:06
10.	"I’ll Keep It with Mine"	(no date listed) Rehearsal. Partially released on The Bootleg Series, Vol. 2, 1991	5:39
11.	"Fourth Time Around"	Take 1 (2/14/1966) Rehearsal	0:12
12.	"Fourth Time Around"	Take 2 (2/14/1966) Breakdown	4:00
13.	"Fourth Time Around"	Takes 3–4 (2/14/1966) Rehearsal	0:46
14.	"Fourth Time Around"	Take 5 (2/14/1966) Complete	4:08
15.	"Fourth Time Around"	Takes 6–7 (2/14/1966) Rehearsal	3:03
16.	"Fourth Time Around"	Take 8 (2/14/1966) Rehearsal	2:02
17.	"Fourth Time Around"	Takes 9–10 (2/14/1966) False starts	0:34
Total length:			55:58

Disc thirteen
No.	Title	Version	Length
1.	"Fourth Time Around" (included on deluxe edition)	Take 11 (2/14/1966) Complete	4:27
2.	"Fourth Time Around"	Takes 12–13 (2/14/1966) False starts	0:47
3.	"Fourth Time Around"	Takes 14–16 (2/14/1966) False starts	0:52
4.	"Fourth Time Around"	Takes 17–18 (2/14/1966) False starts	1:16
5.	"Fourth Time Around"	Take 19 (2/14/1966) Breakdown	1:51
6.	"Fourth Time Around"	Take 19 again (2/14/1966) Released on Blonde On Blonde, 1966	4:36
7.	"Visions of Johanna"	Take 1 (2/14/1966) False start	0:22
8.	"Visions of Johanna"	Take 2 (2/14/1966) Breakdown	2:45
9.	"Visions of Johanna"	Take 3 (2/14/1966) False start	0:34
10.	"Visions of Johanna"	Take 4 (2/14/1966) Released on Blonde On Blonde, 1966	7:33
11.	"Leopard-Skin Pill-Box Hat"	Takes 1–2 (2/14/1966) Rehearsal	1:17
12.	"Leopard-Skin Pill-Box Hat" (included on deluxe edition)	Take 3 (2/14/1966) Complete	4:27
13.	"Leopard-Skin Pill-Box Hat"	Takes 4–5 (2/14/1966) Rehearsal	1:13
14.	"Leopard-Skin Pill-Box Hat"	Take 6 (2/14/1966) Breakdown	1:20
15.	"Leopard-Skin Pill-Box Hat"	Take 6 again (2/14/1966) Rehearsal	0:42
16.	"Leopard-Skin Pill-Box Hat" (included on standard edition)	Take 8 (2/14/1966) Complete	3:26
17.	"Leopard-Skin Pill-Box Hat"	Take 9 (2/14/1966) Breakdown	1:56
18.	"Leopard-Skin Pill-Box Hat"	Take 10 (2/14/1966) False start	0:59
19.	"Leopard-Skin Pill-Box Hat"	Take 11 (2/14/1966) Breakdown	1:46
20.	"Leopard-Skin Pill-Box Hat"	Take 12 (2/14/1966) False start	0:14
21.	"Leopard-Skin Pill-Box Hat"	Take 13 (2/14/1966) Complete	2:41
22.	"I’ll Keep It with Mine (instrumental)"	Take 1 (2/15/1966) Rehearsal	0:31
23.	"I’ll Keep It with Mine (instrumental)"	Take 2 (2/15/1966) Rehearsal	1:08
24.	"I’ll Keep It with Mine (instrumental)"	Take 3 (2/15/1966) Rehearsal	0:07
25.	"I’ll Keep It with Mine (instrumental)"	Take 4 (2/15/1966) Rehearsal	2:01
26.	"I’ll Keep It with Mine (instrumental)"	Take 5 (2/15/1966) Rehearsal	1:48
27.	"I’ll Keep It with Mine (instrumental)"	Takes 6–7 (2/15/1966) Rehearsal	1:17
28.	"I’ll Keep It with Mine (instrumental)"	Take 8 (2/15/1966) Rehearsal	2:06
29.	"I’ll Keep It with Mine (instrumental)"	Take 8 again (2/15/1966) Complete	3:13
30.	"I’ll Keep It with Mine (instrumental)"	Take 9 (2/15/1966) Complete	3:11
Total length:			60:39

Disc fourteen
No.	Title	Version	Length
1.	"Sad-Eyed Lady of the Lowlands" (included on deluxe edition)	Take 1 (2/16/1966) Complete	10:08
2.	"Sad-Eyed Lady of the Lowlands"	Take 2 (2/16/1966) Rehearsal	2:07
3.	"Sad-Eyed Lady of the Lowlands"	Take 3 (2/16/1966) Complete	12:20
4.	"Sad-Eyed Lady of the Lowlands"	Take 4 (2/16/1966) Released on Blonde On Blonde, 1966	11:24
5.	"Stuck Inside of Mobile with the Memphis Blues Again" (included on deluxe edition)	Take 1 (2/17/1966) Rehearsal	3:23
6.	"Stuck Inside of Mobile with the Memphis Blues Again" (included on deluxe edition)	(2/17/1966) Rehearsal	4:54
7.	"Stuck Inside of Mobile with the Memphis Blues Again"	Take 1 (2/17/1966) Breakdown	1:52
8.	"Stuck Inside of Mobile with the Memphis Blues Again"	Takes 2–3 (2/17/1966) Rehearsal	1:13
9.	"Stuck Inside of Mobile with the Memphis Blues Again"	Take 4 (2/17/1966) Breakdown	2:45
10.	"Stuck Inside of Mobile with the Memphis Blues Again"	Take 4 (mis-slate) (2/17/1966) False start	0:10
11.	"Stuck Inside of Mobile with the Memphis Blues Again" (included on deluxe edition)	Take 5 (2/17/1966) Released on The Bootleg Series, Vol. 7, 2005	5:52
12.	"Stuck Inside of Mobile with the Memphis Blues Again"	Takes 6–8 (2/17/1966) False starts	0:40
13.	"Stuck Inside of Mobile with the Memphis Blues Again"	Take 9 (2/17/1966) Breakdown	0:32
14.	"Stuck Inside of Mobile with the Memphis Blues Again"	Take 10 (2/17/1966) False start	0:20
15.	"Stuck Inside of Mobile with the Memphis Blues Again"	Takes 11–12 (2/17/1966) Breakdown	1:44
16.	"Stuck Inside of Mobile with the Memphis Blues Again" (included on standard edition)	Take 13 (2/17/1966) Breakdown	4:08
Total length:			63:37

Disc fifteen
No.	Title	Version	Length
1.	"Stuck Inside of Mobile with the Memphis Blues Again" (included on deluxe edition)	Take 14 (2/17/1966) Complete	7:04
2.	"Stuck Inside of Mobile with the Memphis Blues Again"	Take 15 (2/17/1966) Released on Blonde On Blonde, 1966	7:07
3.	"Absolutely Sweet Marie"	(3/07/1966) Rehearsal	3:19
4.	"Absolutely Sweet Marie" (included on standard edition)	Take 1 (3/07/1966) Complete	5:02
5.	"Absolutely Sweet Marie"	Take 2 (3/07/1966) False start	0:22
6.	"Absolutely Sweet Marie"	Take 3 (3/07/1966) Released on Blonde On Blonde, 1966	4:57
7.	"Absolutely Sweet Marie"	(3/07/1966) Insert	1:17
8.	"Just Like a Woman" (included on deluxe edition)	Take 1 (3/08/1966) Complete	4:32
9.	"Just Like a Woman"	Take 2 (3/08/1966) Complete	5:13
10.	"Just Like a Woman"	Take 3 (3/08/1966) Complete	5:12
11.	"Just Like a Woman" (included on standard edition)	Take 4 (3/08/1966) Complete	5:19
12.	"Pledging My Time" (included on standard edition)	Take 1 (3/08/1966) Breakdown	3:26
13.	"Pledging My Time"	(3/08/1966) Rehearsal	1:11
14.	"Pledging My Time"	Take 2 (3/08/1966) False start	0:21
15.	"Pledging My Time"	Take 3 (3/08/1966) Released on Blonde On Blonde, 1966	4:04
16.	"Just Like a Woman"	Take 5 (3/08/1966) False start	1:15
17.	"Just Like a Woman"	Take 6 (3/08/1966) Breakdown	3:25
Total length:			63:14

Disc sixteen
No.	Title	Version	Length
1.	"Just Like a Woman" (included on deluxe edition)	Take 8 (3/08/1966) Complete	5:21
2.	"Just Like a Woman"	Takes 9–10 (3/08/1966) False start, breakdown	3:46
3.	"Just Like a Woman"	Takes 11–12 (3/08/1966) Rehearsal	1:20
4.	"Just Like a Woman"	Take 13 (3/08/1966) Breakdown	3:54
5.	"Just Like a Woman"	Takes 14–15 (3/08/1966) Rehearsal	1:30
6.	"Just Like a Woman"	Take 16 (3/08/1966) Complete	5:10
7.	"Just Like a Woman"	Take 17 (3/08/1966) Breakdown	0:52
8.	"Just Like a Woman"	Take 18 (3/08/1966) Released on Blonde On Blonde, 1966	4:53
9.	"Most Likely You Go Your Way (And I’ll Go Mine)" (included on deluxe edition)	Take 1 (3/09/1966) Complete	3:38
10.	"Most Likely You Go Your Way (And I’ll Go Mine)"	Take 2 (3/09/1966) Rehearsal	1:04
11.	"Most Likely You Go Your Way (And I’ll Go Mine)"	Take 3 (3/09/1966) Rehearsal	1:42
12.	"Most Likely You Go Your Way (And I’ll Go Mine)"	Take 4 (3/09/1966) Rehearsal	1:34
13.	"Most Likely You Go Your Way (And I’ll Go Mine)"	Take 5 (3/09/1966) Breakdown	1:10
14.	"Most Likely You Go Your Way (And I’ll Go Mine)"	Take 6 (3/09/1966) Released on Blonde on Blonde, 1966	3:29
15.	"Temporary Like Achilles"	Take 1 (3/09/1966) Complete	5:14
16.	"Temporary Like Achilles"	Take 2 (3/09/1966) False start	0:38
17.	"Temporary Like Achilles" (included on deluxe edition)	Take 3 (3/09/1966) Complete	5:41
18.	"Temporary Like Achilles"	Take 4 (3/09/1966) Released on Blonde On Blonde, 1966	5:19
19.	"Rainy Day Women #12 & 35" (included on deluxe edition)	(3/10/1966) Rehearsal	1:35
20.	"Rainy Day Women #12 & 35" (included on deluxe edition; previously released as Columbia single 43592)	Take 1 (3/10/1966) Released on Blonde On Blonde, 1966	4:41
Total length:			62:42

Disc seventeen
No.	Title	Version	Length
1.	"Obviously Five Believers"	Take 1 (3/10/1966) False start	0:58
2.	"Obviously Five Believers"	Take 2 (3/10/1966) Breakdown	1:13
3.	"Obviously Five Believers" (included on deluxe edition)	Take 3 (3/10/1966) Complete	3:46
4.	"Obviously Five Believers"	Take 4 (3/10/1966) Released on Blonde On Blonde, 1966	3:37
5.	"Leopard-Skin Pill-Box Hat"	Take 1 (3/10/1966) Released on Blonde On Blonde, 1966	3:58
6.	"I Want You"	(3/10/1966) Rehearsal	1:58
7.	"I Want You"	Take 1 (3/10/1966) Complete	3:00
8.	"I Want You"	Take 2 (3/10/1966) Rehearsal, breakdown	3:10
9.	"I Want You"	Take 3 (3/10/1966) Rehearsal, false start	0:43
10.	"I Want You" (included on standard edition)	Take 4 (3/10/1966) Complete	2:52
11.	"I Want You"	Take 5 (3/10/1966) Released on Blonde On Blonde, 1966	3:09
12.	"I Want You"	Take 5b (3/10/1966) Insert, guitar overdub	3:08
Total length:			31:38 1077:29

Disc eighteen: hotel room recordings
No.	Title	Version	Length
1.	"Remember Me"	(5/04/1965) Savoy Hotel, London	1:11
2.	"More and More"	(5/04/1965) Savoy Hotel, London	2:12
3.	"Blues Stay Away from Me"	(5/04/1965) Savoy Hotel, London	2:02
4.	"Weary Blues from Waitin'"	(5/04/1965) Savoy Hotel, London	1:31
5.	"Lost Highway"	(5/04/1965) Savoy Hotel, London	2:15
6.	"I'm So Lonesome I Could Cry"	(5/04/1965) Savoy Hotel, London	0:51
7.	"Young But Daily Growing"	(5/04/1965) Savoy Hotel, London	2:51
8.	"Wild Mountain Thyme"	(5/04/1965) Savoy Hotel, London	4:23
9.	"I Can't Leave Her Behind [1]"	(5/13/1966) North British Station Hotel, Glasgow, Scotland	2:42
10.	"I Can't Leave Her Behind [2]"	(5/13/1966) North British Station Hotel, Glasgow, Scotland	4:56
11.	"On a Rainy Afternoon"	(5/13/1966) North British Station Hotel, Glasgow, Scotland	1:38
12.	"If I Was a King [1]"	(5/13/1966) North British Station Hotel, Glasgow, Scotland	3:00
13.	"If I Was a King [2]"	(5/13/1966) North British Station Hotel, Glasgow, Scotland	2:37
14.	"What Kind of Friend Is This"	(5/13/1966) North British Station Hotel, Glasgow, Scotland	2:44
15.	"Positively Van Gogh [1]"	(3/12/1966) Denver, Colorado Hotel Room	0:53
16.	"Positively Van Gogh [2]"	(3/12/1966) Denver, Colorado Hotel Room	6:14
17.	"Positively Van Gogh [3]"	(3/12/1966) Denver, Colorado Hotel Room	2:18
18.	"Don’t Tell Him, Tell Me"	(3/12/1966) Denver, Colorado Hotel Room	1:21
19.	"If You Want My Love"	(3/12/1966) Denver, Colorado Hotel Room	3:53
20.	"Just Like a Woman"	(3/12/1966) Denver, Colorado Hotel Room	4:29
21.	"Sad-Eyed Lady of the Lowlands"	(3/12/1966) Denver, Colorado Hotel Room	13:17
Total length:			67:26

== Personnel ==
- Bob Dylan — vocals, guitar, piano, harmonica
- Mike Bloomfield, Al Gorgoni, John Hammond, Jr., Jerry Kennedy, Bruce Langhorne, Charlie McCoy, Wayne Moss, Kenny Rankin, Robbie Robertson — guitars
- Joe South — guitar, bass guitar
- Paul Griffin — piano, electric piano, organ
- Al Kooper — organ, electric piano, celeste
- Frank Owens — piano, electric piano
- Richard Manuel, Hargus "Pig" Robbins — piano
- Garth Hudson — organ
- John Sebastian — bass guitar, harmonica
- John Boone, Harvey Brooks, Rick Danko, Joseph Macho, Jr., Russ Savakus, Henry Strzelecki — bass guitar
- Kenny Buttrey, Bobby Gregg, Levon Helm, Sandy Konikoff, Sam Lay — drums
- Joan Baez — vocals, guitar on "Remember Me," "More and More," "Blues Stay Away from Me," "Weary Blues from Waitin'," "Lost Highway," "I'm So Lonesome I Could Cry," "Young But Daily Growing," and "Wild Mountain Thyme"
- Angeline Butler — backing vocals on "If You Gotta Go, Go Now"

== Charts ==
=== Weekly ===
Chart (2015)	Peak position
Australian Albums (ARIA)	26
Austrian Albums (Ö3 Austria)	12
Belgian Albums (Ultratop Flanders)	8
Belgian Albums (Ultratop Wallonia)	50
Danish Albums (Hitlisten)	31
Dutch Albums (Album Top 100)	5
French Albums (SNEP)	59
Irish Albums (IRMA)	8
Italian Albums (FIMI)	11
New Zealand Albums (RMNZ)	23
Norwegian Albums (VG-lista)	3
Spanish Albums (Promusicae)	24
Swedish Albums (Sverigetopplistan)	2
Swiss Albums (Schweizer Hitparade)	10
UK Albums (Official Charts)	12
US Billboard 200	33

=== Year-end ===
Chart (2015)	Position
Belgian Albums (Ultratop Flanders)	199

== See also ==
- Bringing It All Back Home
- Highway 61 Revisited
- Blonde on Blonde

== Sources ==
- Heylin, Clinton (2021). The Double Life of Bob Dylan: A Restless, Hungry Feeling (1941–1966). New York City: Little, Brown and Company. ISBN 978-0-316-53521-2.
