= Rainy Day Women Nos. 12 & 35 =

Song by Bob Dylan

"Rainy Day Women #12 & 35"
- Dutch picture sleeve

Single by Bob Dylan

from the album Blonde on Blonde
- B-side: "Pledging My Time"
- Released: March 22, 1966
- Recorded: March 10, 1966
- Studio: Columbia, Nashville
- Length: 4:36 (album); 2:26 (single)
- Label: Columbia
- Songwriter: Bob Dylan
- Producer: Bob Johnston

Bob Dylan singles chronology
"One of Us Must Know (Sooner or Later)" (1966)	"Rainy Day Women #12 & 35" (1966)	"I Want You" (1966)

"Rainy Day Women #12 & 35" (sometimes erroneously called "Everybody Must Get Stoned") is a song written and recorded by Bob Dylan, appearing as the opening track of his seventh studio album, Blonde on Blonde. Columbia Records first released an edited version as a single in March 1966, which reached numbers two and seven in the US and UK charts respectively, and has been included on several compilation albums.

"Rainy Day Women #12 & 35" was recorded in one take in Columbia's Nashville, Tennessee studio with session musicians. The track was produced by Bob Johnston and features a raucous brass band accompaniment. There has been much debate over both the meaning of the title and of the recurrent chorus, "Everybody must get stoned". Consequently, it became controversial, with some commentators labeling it as "a drug song". The song received acclaim from music critics, several of whom highlighted the playful nature of the track. Over the years, it became one of Dylan's most performed concert pieces, sometimes with variations in the arrangement.

== Background and recording ==
A few weeks after the release of his sixth studio album Highway 61 Revisited (1965), Bob Dylan began to record his next album on October 5, 1965, at Columbia Studio A, New York City. The producer was Bob Johnston who had supervised all the later recording sessions for Highway 61 Revisited in the same studio. Following unproductive sessions in November 1965 and January 1966, Johnston suggested that Dylan move the location for his next recording session to Nashville, Tennessee. Johnston hired experienced session musicians, including Charlie McCoy, Wayne Moss, Kenneth Buttrey and Joe South, to play with Dylan. They were joined by Robbie Robertson and Al Kooper who had both played at earlier sessions.

Paul Williams described "Rainy Day Women #12 & 35" as "a sound, a set of sounds, created on the spot, shaped by the moment just as Dylan's songwriting method is reshaped at each separate moment in his career." The song is notable for its brass band arrangement and the controversial chorus "Everybody must get stoned". Kooper, who played keyboards on Blonde on Blonde, recalled that when Dylan initially demoed the song to the backing musicians in Columbia's Nashville studio, Johnston suggested that "it would sound great Salvation Army style". When Dylan queried how they would find horn players in the middle of the night, McCoy, who played trumpet, made a phone call and summoned a trombone player.

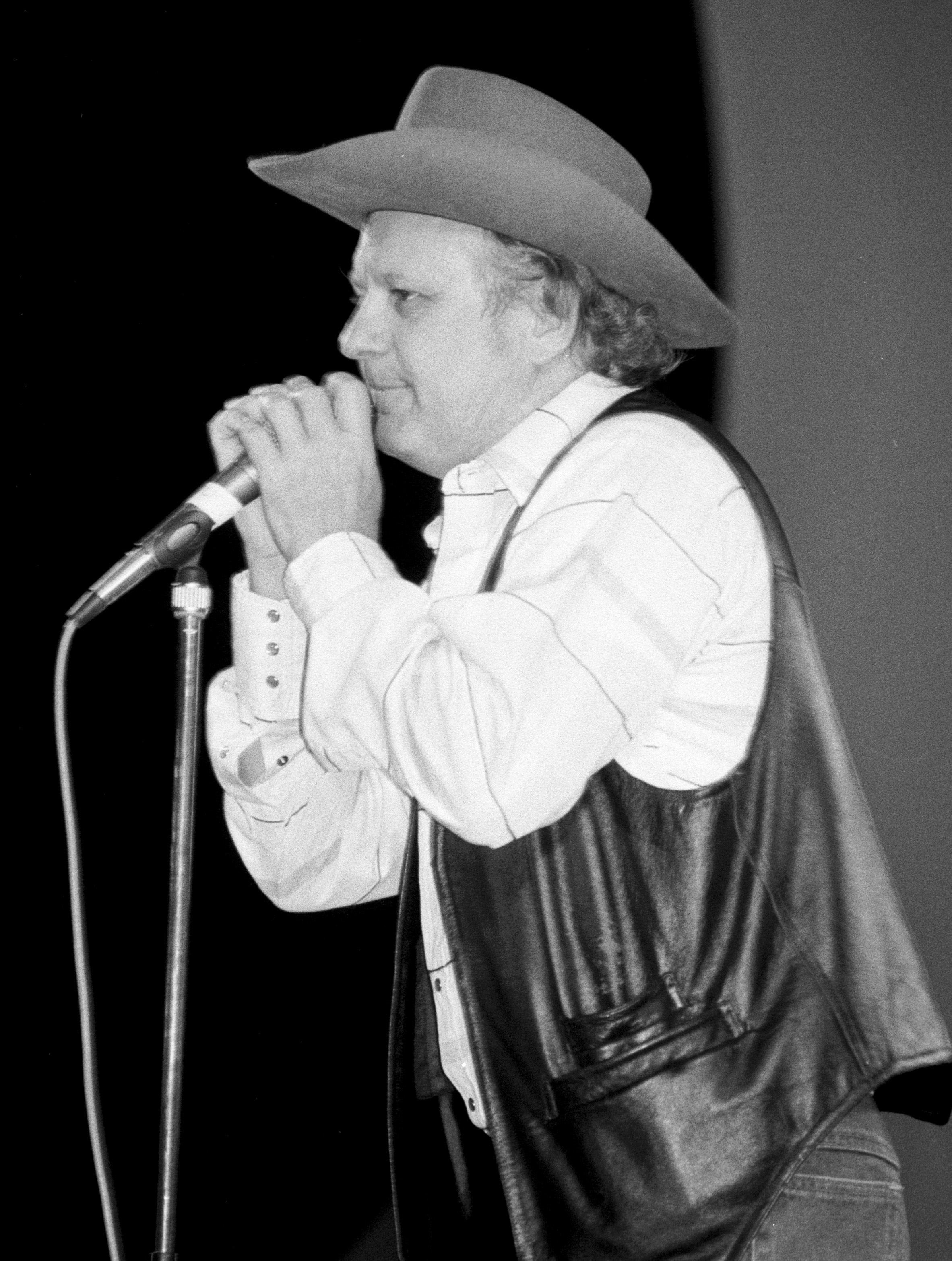
Charlie McCoy (pictured in 1990) played trumpet on the track. He wrote out the horn parts after a late night call to his Escorts bandmate Wayne Butler, who came in to join the session.

The track was recorded in Columbia Music Row Studios in Nashville in the early hours of March 10, 1966. In the account by Dylan biographer Howard Sounes, the chaotic musical atmosphere of the track was attained by the musicians playing in unorthodox ways and on unfamiliar instruments. McCoy switched from bass to trumpet. Drummer Kenny Buttrey set up his bass drum on two chairs and played it using a timpani mallet. Moss played bass, while Strzelecki played Kooper's organ. Kooper played a tambourine. Producer Bob Johnston recalled, "all of us walking around, yelling, playing and singing." Following one rehearsal, the song was recorded in a single take. Guitarist Robertson missed the recording as he had left the studio to buy cigarettes.

Sean Wilentz, who listened to the complete studio tapes to research his book on Dylan, wrote that the chatter before the take is "if not seriously whacked, certainly jacked up and high-spirited." Before the take, producer Bob Johnston asked Dylan for the song's title and Dylan replied, "A Long-Haired Mule and a Porcupine Here." Johnston said, "It's the only one time that I ever heard Dylan really laugh, really belly-laugh ... going around the studio, marching in that thing."

Sounes quoted Moss recalling that in order to record "Rainy Day Women", Dylan insisted the backing musicians must be intoxicated. A studio employee was sent to an Irish bar to obtain "Leprechaun cocktails". In Sounes's account, Moss, Hargus "Pig" Robbins, and Henry Strzelecki claimed they also smoked a "huge amount" of marijuana and "got pretty wiped out". Sounes stated that some musicians, including McCoy, remained unintoxicated. This version of events has been challenged by Wilentz's and Sanders's studies of the making of Blonde on Blonde. According to Wilentz, both McCoy and Kooper insisted that all the musicians were sober and that Dylan's manager, Albert Grossman, would not have permitted pot or drink in the studio. In support of this account, Wilentz pointed out that three other tracks were recorded that night in the Nashville studio, all of which appeared on the final album. McCoy recalled the "Leprechaun cocktails" incident as relating to a different recording session several years later.

== Composition and lyrical interpretation ==
Dylan biographer Robert Shelton writes that he was told by Phil Spector that the inspiration for the song came when Spector and Dylan heard Ray Charles on a Los Angeles jukebox sing "Let's Go Get Stoned", written by husband and wife songwriting team Ashford & Simpson. Spector said "they were surprised to hear a song that free, that explicit", referring to its chorus of "getting stoned" as an invitation to indulge in alcohol or narcotics. In fact, the Charles song was released in April 1966, after "Rainy Day Women" was recorded. Both the Coasters and Ronnie Milsap released versions in 1965; the Coasters version was a B-side and commercially unsuccessful, and journalist Daryl Sanders suggested that it may have been Milsap's version, the B-side of "Never Had It So Good", which Dylan heard.

The song is recorded as a twelve-bar blues, although the lyrics are not typical of the blues genre. However, the pattern of a repeated introduction (i.e. "They'll stone ya when they say that it’s the end...") and conclusion "I would not feel so all alone / Everybody must get stoned") to each stanza recalls a blues format. Musicologist Wilfrid Mellers described the song as "musically corny: a parody of a New Orleans marching or Yankee Revivalist band". According to music scholar Timothy Koozin, Dylan "exaggerates the musical vulgarity with a descending chromatic figure" that is out of place in a twelve-bar blues, and serves to "form a mimetic representation of sinking into a 'stoned' stupor".

After recording Blonde on Blonde, Dylan embarked on his 1966 world tour. At a press conference in Stockholm on April 28, 1966, Dylan was asked about the meaning of his new hit single, "Rainy Day Women". Dylan replied the song was about "cripples and orientals and the world in which they live ... It's a sort of Mexican thing, very protest ... and one of the protestiest of all things I've protested against in my protest years."

Shelton states that, as the song rose up the charts, it became controversial as a "drug song"; consequently the song was banned by some American and British radio stations. He mentions that Time magazine, on July 1, 1966, wrote: "In the shifting multi-level jargon of teenagers, 'to get stoned' does not mean to get drunk but to get high on drugs ... a 'rainy-day woman', as any junkie [sic] knows, is a marijuana cigarette." Dylan responded to the controversy by announcing, during his May 27, 1966, performance at the Royal Albert Hall, London, "I never have and never will write a drug song."

According to Dylan critic Clinton Heylin, Dylan was determined to use a "fairly lame pun"—the idea of being physically stoned for committing a sin, as opposed to being stoned on "powerful medicine"—to avoid being banned on the radio. Given its Old Testament connotations, Heylin argued that the Salvation Army band backing becomes more appropriate. Heylin further suggested that the song's title is a Biblical reference, taken from the Book of Proverbs, "which contains a huge number of edicts for which one could genuinely get stoned". He suggested that the title "Rainy Day Women #12 & 35" refers to Proverbs chapter 27, verse 15 (in the King James Bible): "A continual dropping in a very rainy day and a contentious woman are alike."

Dylan critic Andrew Muir suggested that the mood of paranoia conjured up by the recurrent phrase "they'll stone you" is a reference to the hostile reaction of Dylan's audience to his new sound. "Dylan was 'being stoned' by audiences around the world for moving to Rock from Folk," wrote Muir, who also suggested the seemingly nonsensical verses of "Rainy Day Women" can be heard as echoes of social and political conflicts in the U.S. For Muir, "They'll stone ya when you're tryin’ to keep your seat" evokes the refusal of black people to move to the back of the bus during the civil rights struggle. For Muir, "They'll stone you and then say you are brave / They'll stone you when you are set down in your grave" reminds listeners that Dylan also wrote "Masters of War" and other "anti-militarism songs that mourned the waste of young men being sent off to be maimed or killed". Koozin interprets the song as aimed at the media and "every other authoritative force in society that oppresses and clouds the individual's mind with untruths". He comments that there is a disconnect between the jovial atmosphere of the track and the "seriousness of the subject matter". David Yaffe felt that it was "the equation between toking up and a public stoning that made it Dylanesque". Writer and musician Mike Edison called the song "Bob Dylan's stoner anthem".

According to Heylin, Dylan "finally explained" the song when speaking to New York radio host Bob Fass in 1986: "'Everybody must get stoned' is like when you go against the tide ... you might in different times find yourself in an unfortunate situation and so to do what you believe in sometimes ... some people they just take offence to that. You can look through history and find that people have taken offence to people who come out with a different viewpoint on things."

In a 2012 interview in Rolling Stone, Mikal Gilmore asked Dylan if he worried about "misguided" interpretations of his songs, adding: "For example, some people still see 'Rainy Day Women' as coded about getting high." Dylan responded: "It doesn't surprise me that some people would see it that way. But these are people that aren't familiar with the Book of Acts."

== Releases ==
An edited version of "Rainy Day Women #12 & 35", lasting 2 minutes and 26 seconds, was released as a single on March 22, 1966, with "Pledging My Time" as the B-side. The third and fifth verses were omitted, to make the duration more suitable for radio play. The single entered the Billboard Hot 100 charts on April 23 and remained on the chart for nine weeks, peaking at number two. On May 12, the single entered the UK Singles Chart for the start of an eight-week run, where its highest placing was seventh. It also appeared at number three in Canada, and ninth in the Netherlands. Blonde on Blonde, Dylan's seventh studio album, was issued as a double album on June 20, with "Rainy Day Women" and "Pledging My Time" as its first two tracks. The album track has a duration of 4 minutes and 36 seconds.

The song has been included on several of Dylan's compilation and live albums. A short rehearsal, lasting around 1:41, was included with the finished track on the collector's edition of The Bootleg Series Vol. 12: The Cutting Edge 1965–1966 (2015); this has a total duration of 6:17.

== Critical comments ==
Cash Box described the single version as a "rollicking, honky-tonk-ish blueser essayed in a contagious good-natured style by the songster." Record World said that the "happytime sound with bitter lyric sounds as if it were recorded at a fun party." Sandy Gardiner of The Ottawa Journal wrote that the song was "good for a laugh ... crazy title and the song is even cornier" and felt that it could be commercially successful despite being "nonsense".

Reviewing the album version, Ralph Gleason of the San Francisco Examiner welcomed the song as "comic, satirical ... with its Ma Rainey traditional blues feeling, its wild lyrics." London Life reviewer Deirdre Leigh enjoyed the song as "jolly, uncomplicated and so blatantly meaningless", In Crawdaddy!, Williams opined that the song was "brilliant in its simplicity: in a way, it's Dylan's answer to the uptight cats who are searching for messages." Craig McGregor of The Sydney Morning Herald felt that, like some other tracks from the album, the song was forgettable, and wrote that "stripped of its drug implications, [the song] is a banal piece of musical hokum".

In his 1990 book Bob Dylan, Performing Artist, Williams wrote that the "combination drunk party/revival meeting sound of the song is wonderful", and resulted from the "unique musical chemistry" between Dylan, the musicians and the producer. Mike Marqusee enjoyed the track as a "marvelous one-off, even in Dylan's catalogue". Similarly, John Nogowski regarded it as "a delightful stroke of lunacy ... refreshing". Neil Spencer gave the song a rating of 4/5 stars in an Uncut magazine Dylan supplement in 2015.

In 2013, readers of Rolling Stone voted "Rainy Day Women #12 & 35" the third-worst of Dylan's songs. The magazine's Andy Green wrote that "today many fans feel it's the only weak moment on the otherwise flawless Blonde on Blonde". The same year, Jim Beviglia included the song in his ranking of Dylan's "finest"; suggesting that attempting to analyse the meaning behind the track in depth was pointless, and that "the song just wants listeners to enjoy themselves for the duration of it". In 2015, the song was ranked 72nd on Rolling Stone's "100 Greatest Bob Dylan Songs".

== Live performances and cover versions ==
According to his official website, Dylan has performed "Rainy Day Women #12 & 35" live 963 times, more than any other track on Blonde on Blonde. It is the eleventh-most performed number from over 700 different songs that he has played live. The first performance was at the Isle of Wight Festival on August 31, 1969, and the most recent was at Desert Trip in Indio, California on October 14, 2016. A day before the Indio show, in Las Vegas, it became the first song he performed in concert after the announcement that he had been awarded the Nobel Prize in Literature. During Dylan's 1978 world tour, the song was performed as an instrumental, and in the early 2000s it was performed in what Oliver Trager described as a "roadhouse blues" style. Yaffe believed that while Dylan deliberately sounded "stoned" in the original studio recording, his live performances several decades later were performed in a voice "more like a grizzled bluesman than a druggie".

The first cover version of "Rainy Day Women #12 & 35" was recorded soon after the original by Blonde on Blonde producer Johnston, using the pseudonym Colonel Jubilation B. Johnson, and several musicians from the Dylan recording session. According to Mark Deming, Johnston "became so enamored of the shambolic sound of 'Rainy Day Women' that he and the Nashville session crew who played on Blonde on Blonde used it as the basis for an entire album". The album including the song, Moldy Goldies: Colonel Jubilation B. Johnston and His Mystic Knights Band and Street Singers, was released in 1966 by Columbia records.

== Personnel ==
Musicians

- Bob Dylan – vocals, harmonica
- Charlie McCoy – trumpet
- Wayne Moss – electric bass
- Henry Strzelecki – organ
- Hargus "Pig" Robbins – piano
- Al Kooper – tambourine
- Kenneth Buttrey – drums
- Wayne Butler – trombone

Technical

- Bob Johnston – record producer

== Charts performance ==
The song reached number two on the Billboard Hot 100 in the week of May 21, 1966. The Mamas and the Papas' "Monday, Monday" prevented it from reaching the top of the chart. "Like a Rolling Stone" (1965) had also reached number two; they were Dylan's highest-charting singles until "Murder Most Foul" in 2020.

=== Weekly singles charts ===
Chart (1966)	Peak position
Australia (Note: From Australian Chart Book 1940–1969 compiled by David Kent, "based on charts specially compiled for this publication, from hit parades, radio charts and best sellers lists".)	17
Canadian RPM Singles Chart	3
Netherlands (Dutch Top 40)	9
New Zealand (NZ listener charts)	13
UK Singles Chart	7
US Billboard Hot 100	2
US Cash Box Top 100	2

=== Year-end charts ===
Chart (1966)	Rank
Netherlands (Dutch Top 40)	78
US Billboard Top Records of 1966 (Note: Based on chart positions, not sales, for the year to December 10, 1966)	74
US Cash Box (Note: Based on "a weighted point system" which took account of both time and highest position on weekly charts, for the year to November 15, 1966.)	67

== Bibliography ==
- Beviglia, Jim (2013). Counting Down Bob Dylan: His 100 Finest Songs. Lanham: Scarecrow Press. ISBN 978-0-8108-8824-1.
- Heylin, Clinton (2009). Revolution in the Air: The Songs of Bob Dylan, Volume One: 1957–73. Constable. ISBN 978-1-84901-051-1.
- Heylin, Clinton (2016). Judas!: From Forest Hills to the Free Trade Hall: A Historical View of Dylan's Big Boo (Kindle ed.). Route Publishing. ISBN 978-1-901927-68-9.
- Heylin, Clinton (2021). The Double Life of Bob Dylan. Vol. 1 1941-1966, A restless, hungry feeling. London: The Bodley Head. ISBN 978-1-84792-588-6.
- Kent, David (2005). Australian Chart Book 1940-1969. Turramurra: Australian Chart Book. ISBN 0-646-44439-5.
- Koozin, Timothy (2016). "Irony, Myth, and Temporal Organization in the Early Songs of Bob Dylan". In Turner, Katherine L. (ed.). This is the Sound of Irony: Music, Politics and Popular Culture. London: Routledge. pp. 73–89. ISBN 9781317010531.
- Marcus, Greil (2005). Like a Rolling Stone: Bob Dylan at the Crossroads. London: Faber and Faber. p. 250. ISBN 9780571223855.
- Marqusee, Mike (2005). Wicked Messenger: Bob Dylan and the 1960s. New York: Seven Stories Press. ISBN 978-1-58322-686-5.
- Mellers, Wilfrid (1985). A Darker Shade of Pale: A Backdrop to Bob Dylan. Oxford University Press. ISBN 0-571-13345-2.
- Nogowski, John (2022). Bob Dylan: A Descriptive, Critical Discography and Filmography, 1961-2022 (3rd ed.). Jefferson: McFarland and Company. ISBN 978-1-4766-4362-5.
- Sanders, Daryl (2020). That Thin, Wild Mercury Sound: Dylan, Nashville, and the Making of Blonde on Blonde (epub ed.). Chicago: Chicago Review Press. ISBN 978-1-61373-550-3.
- Shelton, Robert (2011). No Direction Home: The Life and Music of Bob Dylan (Revised & updated ed.). Omnibus Press. ISBN 978-184938-458-2.
- Sounes, Howard (2001). Down the Highway: The Life of Bob Dylan. New York: Grove Press. ISBN 0-8021-1686-8.
- Starr, Larry (2021). Listening to Bob Dylan. Music in American Life (Kindle ed.). Urbana: University of Illinois Press. ISBN 978-0-252-05288-0.
- Trager, Oliver (2004). Keys to the Rain: the Definitive Bob Dylan Encyclopedia. New York: Billboard Books. ISBN 978-0-8230-7974-2.
- Whitburn, Joel (2010). Hot R&B Songs: 1942-2010. Menomonee Falls: Record Research. ISBN 978-0-89820-186-4.
- Wilentz, Sean (2009). Bob Dylan in America. London: The Bodley Head. ISBN 978-1-84792-150-5.
- Wilentz, Sean (2010). "4: The Sound of 3:00 am: The Making of Blonde on Blonde, New York City and Nashville, October 5, 1965 – March 10 (?), 1966". Bob Dylan in America. London: Vintage Digital. ISBN 978-1-4070-7411-5. Archived from the original on August 19, 2022 – via Pop Matters.
- Williams, Paul (1969) [1st pub. Crawdaddy!: July 1966]. "Understanding Dylan". Outlaw blues; a book of rock music. New York: E. P. Dutton. pp. 59–69.
- Williams, Paul (2004) [1990]. Bob Dylan, Performing Artist: The Early Years, 1960–1973. Omnibus Press. ISBN 978-1-84449-095-0.
- Yaffe, David (2011). Like a Complete Unknown. New Haven: Yale University Press. ISBN 978-0-300-12457-6.
