= Pledging My Time =

- Danish picture sleeve

Single by Bob Dylan

from the album Blonde on Blonde
- A-side: "Rainy Day Women #12 & 35"
- Released: March 22, 1966
- Recorded: March 8, 1966
- Genre: Electric blues
- Length: 2:06 (single); 3:50 (album)
- Label: Columbia
- Songwriter: Bob Dylan
- Producer: Bob Johnston

Audio
- "Pledging My Time" on YouTube

"Pledging My Time" is a blues song by the American singer-songwriter Bob Dylan from his seventh studio album, Blonde on Blonde (1966). The song, written by Dylan and produced by Bob Johnston, was recorded on March 8, 1966 in Nashville, Tennessee. Dylan is featured on lead vocals, harmonica, and guitar, backed by guitarist Robbie Robertson and an ensemble of veteran Nashville session men.

As with most of the album's songs, "Pledging My Time" was conceived, composed, and recorded within the span of a few weeks. The song was first released, in shortened form, two weeks after its recording, as the B-side of the single "Rainy Day Women #12 & 35", a Top 10 hit in both the United States and Great Britain. The two songs also led off Blonde on Blonde, rock's first double album, which was officially released June 20, 1966.

Played in Chicago blues style, "Pledging My Time" depicts a young man who pledges himself to a prospective lover, hoping "[she]'ll come through, too". The song's musical and lyrical influences are thought to include Robert Johnson's "Come on in My Kitchen", "It Hurts Me Too" by Elmore James, and the Mississippi Sheiks classic "Sittin' on Top of the World".

Dylan performed "Pledging My Time" at 21 concerts from 1987 through 1999. He revived it two decades later, in 2021, for the soundtrack of his concert film Shadow Kingdom: The Early Songs of Bob Dylan. The song has also been covered on tribute albums by artists such as bluesman Luther "Guitar Junior" Johnson, folk musician Greg Brown, and the Americana band Old Crow Medicine Show.

== Background and recording ==
"Pledging My Time" is an 8-bar blues song various writers link to the influences of Chicago blues legends Elmore James and Muddy Waters, as well as Mississippi Delta greats Robert Johnson and the Mississippi Sheiks. Dylan was first exposed to the blues as a teenager during the 1950s. He wrote and recorded a handful of blues songs for his early acoustic albums, but began focusing on the genre with his 1965 album Highway 61 Revisited, which featured several electric blues tracks.

Early in the fall of 1965, about a month after Highway 61's release, Dylan was back in Columbia's New York studios to begin work on his next album. After five sessions that stretched into early 1966 and produced only one usable track, Columbia producer Bob Johnston convinced Dylan to move the recordings to Nashville, where Johnston had previously worked at Columbia's studios on the city's legendary Music Row.

Dylan, who was on the North American leg of his 1966 World Tour, arrived in Nashville in mid-February with only a couple new songs in mind and only two musicians from the New York sessions, guitarist Robbie Robertson and organist Al Kooper. Johnston assembled a studio band that included some of Nashville's top session men, including drummer Kenny Buttrey, pianist Hargus "Pig" Robbins, bassist Henry Strzelecki, and guitarists Charlie McCoy, Wayne Moss and Joe South.

After three days in the studio with his new ensemble, Dylan left Nashville in mid-February to play eight dates that took him from New England to Canada to Florida. He returned to Music Row in early March for four more sessions. In the second of these, on March 8, the group laid down three new tracks, "Absolutely Sweet Marie", "Pledging My Time", and "Just Like a Woman". Only two full takes of "Pledging My Time" were recorded, the second of which became the master. (The first take was released on The Bootleg Series Vol. 12: The Cutting Edge 1965–1966 in 2015.) During the session, Dylan borrowed one of Buttrey's drumsticks to beat out a rhythm on the snare drum to show the musicians the "strong beat" he wanted.

Dylan wrapped up recording for the album with sessions on March 9 and 10. "Pledging My Time" was released in the United States on March 22 as the B-side of "Rainy Day Women #12 & 35". Both tracks had two verses removed for the release. The second and fifth verses were cut from "Pledging My Time, which fades out at the end of the single's third verse. As a result, the single version ran a mere 2 minutes and 6 seconds, while the album track clocked in at 3 minutes and 50 seconds. The record reached number 2 on the Billboard Hot 100 and number 7 on the UK Singles Chart. Blonde on Blonde was issued as a double album on June 20 with "Rainy Day Women" and "Pledging My Time" as its first two tracks. In 2003, the album was ranked #9 in Rolling Stone magazine's "500 Greatest Albums of All Time" issue.

== Composition and lyrical interpretation ==
"Pledging My Time"
The first verse from the second track of Bob Dylan's 1966 Blonde on Blonde, recorded at Columbia Studios in Nashville.

After the February recording dates, knowing he had three weeks to prepare for the next set of sessions for Blonde on Blonde, Dylan wrote 11 songs, eight of which were to appear on the album. Initially, he typed out song ideas on a few sheets of paper. One of these notes read "PLEDGING MY TIME if nothing comes outa this you'll soon know", a reference to the song's eventual title as well as the first draft of the lyric "if it don't work out/You'll be the first to know". Initially listed in the studio logs as "What Can You Do for My Wigwam", the title was changed after two takes to "Pledging My Time". (Note: The song is unrelated to Dylan's later "Wigwam".) Biographer Clinton Heylin contends the title was "surely a knowing reference to the Johnny Ace song 'Pledging My Love'". In 1974, Dylan told Maureen Orth of Newsweek that "the singers and musicians I grew up with transcend nostalgia – Buddy Holly and Johnny Ace are just as valid to me today as then." However, Daryl Sanders, in his book That Thin, Wild Mercury Sound, points out that Ace's song was a "much slower R&B ballad", differed in style from Dylan's track, and did not include the phrase "pledging my love" in its lyrics.

The album track opens with Dylan's harmonica, as do 10 other of Blonde on Blonde's 14 songs. The song proceeds at a slow pulsing pace set by Ken Buttrey's drumming, with Robertson's guitar and Robbins' piano creating a heavy Chicago blues sound. According to music critic Andy Gill in Bob Dylan: The Stories Behind the Songs 1962–1969, the song has a "smoky late-night club ambiance", while author Oliver Trager's Keys to the Rain: The Definitive Bob Dylan Encyclopedia describes the singer as sounding "reluctant, fatigued, and maybe even a little stoned".

Gill observes that following the "goodtime goofing" of "Rainy Day Women #12 & 35", the first track on side one, "'Pledging My Time' sets a humid, emotionally oppressive tone for the rest of the album". The song depicts a suitor pledging himself to his prospective lover with the hope that she will reciprocate. Dylan's imagery includes the singer's "poison headache," a hobo stealing his lover, the possibility that the relationship may not work out, and the stuffy room where everyone's gone except for him and his girlfriend and he "can't be the last to leave".

In his book Wicked Messenger: Bob Dylan in the 1960s, critic Mike Marqusee writes that the closing verse "hints at a dark betrayal that is both portentous and frighteningly devoid of meaning":

Well they sent for the ambulance
And one was sent
Somebody got lucky
But it was an accident
Now I'm pledging my time to you
Hopin' you'll come through too.

— Bob Dylan, closing verse of "Pledging My Time"

The stanza's "somebody got lucky" offers a distinct clue as to one of the song's inspirations. Both Marqusee and Trager point to the similarities between "Pledging My Time" and Robert Johnson's "Come on in My Kitchen", especially regarding Johnson's line that "some joker got lucky".

Ah the woman I love
Took from my best friend
Some joker got lucky
Stole her back again
You better come on in my kitchen
Babe it going to be rainin outdoors

— Robert Johnson, opening verse of "Come on in My Kitchen"

Other possible musical influences include the Elmore James classic "It Hurts Me Too" and the Mississippi Sheiks' "Sittin' on Top of the World".

== Critical reception ==
Cash Box described the song as a "low-down, funky soulful blues-soaked romancer." Neil Spencer gave the song a rating of 3/5 stars in an Uncut magazine Dylan supplement in 2015. Author John Nogowski rated the song as "B", and commended it as "well performed with some exciting harmonica work." In his biography, No Direction Home, The Life and Music of Bob Dylan, Robert Shelton wrote that the song was a "slow blues, strong and pulsing, with heavy Chicago influence. Mouth-harp swipes and extended harp breaks after the third and fifth verses build atmosphere. The lyric resembles improvised blues, with sophistication creeping in. Continuity of mood vanquishes disorder in phrasing."

Michael Gray, author of The Bob Dylan Encyclopedia, considers the track "superb ... because of what it achieves as a blues". Journalist and author Daryl Sanders praised the musicianship, including Roberson's "biting" guitar work, and Dylan's "dextrous and dynamic harp lines that at times were transcendent". Dylan's harmonica playing is also lauded by authors Philippe Margotin and Jean-Michel Guesdon, who refer to it in their book Bob Dylan: All the Songs as "extraordinary ... typical of a Chicago blues song and a real success." Singer-songwriter Robyn Hitchcock observed that "Dylan has always been a visual writer, but (in "Pledging My Time") I can really see the scene".

A mono version of the song was released on The Original Mono Recordings (2010). Reviewing the album, musicologist Christopher Reali wrote that "the mono mix of 'Pledging My Time' wants to burst beyond the confines of the speakers, but it cannot. In contrast, the sprawling sound heard on the stereo mix deflates the mood of the track losing all of the focused intensity heard on the mono mix."

== Live performances and covers ==
Dylan omitted "Pledging My Time" from his concert performances for over two decades. In 1987, in a series of appearances with The Grateful Dead, he revived the song along with several others he had left off his set lists. He subsequently included the song in his tour later that year with Tom Petty & The Heartbreakers. When Dylan began his Never Ending Tour in 1989, "Pledging My Time" was featured on two dates that summer, and he continued performing the song at occasional concerts through the end of the 1990s. According to his official website, Dylan played "Pledging My Time" in concert a total of 21 times from 1987 to 1999.

"Pledging My Time" was first covered by the Japanese psychedelic band Apryl Fool in 1969 for their lone, self-titled album. Luther "Guitar Junior" Johnson recorded a version of the song in 1999 that appeared on several blues compilations, including one Dylan tribute album. In addition, American singer-songwriter Greg Brown recorded "Pledging My Time" for A Nod to Bob, a 2006 album by various artists issued in observance of Dylan's 65th birthday.

Meanwhile, two cover albums have been issued in tribute to the songs on Blonde on Blonde. Duke Robillard covered "Pledging My Time" for Blues on Blonde on Blonde, which was released in 2003. And in 2017, a bluegrass interpretation of the song was featured on Old Crow Medicine Show's concert album 50 Years of Blonde on Blonde, with group founder Keith Secor handling the lead vocals.

After neglecting the song for another two decades, Dylan revived it again for Shadow Kingdom: The Early Songs of Bob Dylan (2021), a "concert film" shot on a soundstage that was streamed during the pandemic. In reference to Dylan's film performance of "Pledging My Time", Damien Love of Uncut magazine described him "as casting softly after the shadow of Little Walter", the legendary blues harmonica player. On a similar note, Jon Bream of the Star Tribune praised Dylan's latest rendition of the song as "slow and seductive".

== Credits and personnel ==
Musicians

- Bob Dylan – vocals, harmonica
- Charlie McCoy – acoustic guitar
- Robbie Robertson – electric guitar
- Joe South – electric guitar
- Al Kooper – organ
- Hargus "Pig" Robbins – piano
- Henry Strzelecki – electric bass guitar
- Kenneth Buttrey – drums

Technical

- Bob Johnston – record producer

== Charts and positions ==
The single, with "Rainy Day Women #12 & 35" and "Pledging My Time" on the A-side and B-side respectively, reached No. 2 on the Billboard Hot 100 on the week of May 21, 1966, was kept off the top spot by The Mamas and the Papas' "Monday, Monday". It also reached No. 7 on the UK Singles Chart.

=== Weekly singles charts ===
Chart (1966)	Peak position
Canadian RPM Singles Chart	3
Netherlands (Dutch Top 40)	9
UK Singles Chart	7
US Billboard Hot 100	2
US Cash Box Top 100	2

=== Year-end charts ===
Chart (1966)	Rank
US Billboard Top Records of 1966 (Note: Based on chart positions, not sales, for the year to December 10, 1966)	74
US Cash Box (Note: Based on "a weighted point system" which took account of both time and highest position on weekly charts, for the year to November 15, 1966.)	67
