= One of Us Must Know (Sooner or Later) =

- Dutch picture sleeve

Single by Bob Dylan

from the album Blonde on Blonde
- B-side: "Queen Jane Approximately"
- Released: February 14, 1966
- Recorded: January 25, 1966
- Studio: Columbia A, New York
- Length: 4:55
- Label: Columbia
- Songwriter: Bob Dylan
- Producer: Bob Johnston

Bob Dylan singles chronology
"Can You Please Crawl Out Your Window?" (1965)	"One of Us Must Know (Sooner or Later)" (1966)	"Rainy Day Women #12 & 35" (1966)

Official audio
- "One of Us Must Know (Sooner or Later)" on YouTube

"One of Us Must Know (Sooner or Later)" is a song by the American singer-songwriter Bob Dylan, which was released as a single on February 14, 1966, and as the fourth track on his seventh studio album Blonde on Blonde in June of that year. The song was written by Dylan and produced by Bob Johnston. It is the narrator's account of a burned-out relationship. It was recorded at Columbia studio A in New York on January 25, 1966, with Dylan and other musicians developing the song through over twenty takes during the session.

As a single, it peaked at No. 33 in the UK Singles Chart, but only reached No. 119 on the US Billboard magazine's Bubbling Under the Hot 100 chart. Reviewers at the time of the single's release afforded it a largely negative reception, with Dylan's vocal performance a particular focus of disapproval. Later critical assessments have been more positive. The song was included on The Original Mono Recordings (2010) and alternate versions appeared on The Bootleg Series Vol. 12: The Cutting Edge 1965–1966 (2015).

== Background and recording ==
Bob Dylan's sixth studio album, Highway 61 Revisited, was released on August 30, 1965. On October 5, Dylan and members of the Hawks, who had played several recent live concerts with him, held the first of the recording sessions for his next album at Columbia Studio A, New York, with Bob Johnston as producer. The next sessions were held on November 30, and on January 21, 1966, with some personnel changes. The fourth session, on January 25, 1966, started with two takes of Dylan's "Leopard-Skin Pill-Box Hat". This was followed by a number initially listed in studio records as "Song Unknown" as Dylan had not devised a title; it was later titled "One of Us Must Know (Sooner or Later)". Dylan sang, and played electric guitar and harmonica on the track, accompanied by Robbie Robertson (electric guitar), Al Kooper (organ), Paul Griffin (piano), Rick Danko (electric bass) and Bobby Gregg (drums). With Dylan piecing together the song's sections, and the chorus that gives the song its title only emerging on take five, the session stretched through the night and into the next morning. According to Rolling Stone, it took nine hours and 24 takes to complete the song. The master take lasts four minutes and 55 seconds.

It was the first recording completed for Bob Dylan's seventh studio album, Blonde on Blonde, and the only recording selected from the New York sessions. Later recording sessions for the album were transferred to Nashville, at Johnston's suggestion. Dylan appeared on New York radio station WBAI later that evening, and mentioned that he had just recorded his new single, which he felt was superior to his previous two singles, and comparable to his "Like a Rolling Stone". In 1969, Dylan told interviewer Jann Wenner that it was one of his favorite songs.

== Releases ==
"One of Us Must Know (Sooner or Later)" was released as a single backed with "Queen Jane Approximately" on February 14, 1966. It reached number 33 in the UK Singles Chart, but only number 119 on the American Billboard magazine Bubbling Under the Hot 100 chart. For the Netherlands and Sweden single releases, "Queen Jane Approximately" was the A-side and "One of Us Must Know (Sooner or Later)" was the B-side. It was included as the fourth track on side one of the double album Blonde on Blonde on June 20, 1966.

The song was included on The Original Mono Recordings (2010) and alternate versions appeared on The Bootleg Series Vol. 12: The Cutting Edge 1965–1966 (2015); the complete recording of the session was included on the Collector's Edition.

== Lyrical interpretation ==
"One of Us Must Know (Sooner or Later)" is a straightforward account of a burned-out relationship. Dissecting what went wrong, the narrator takes a defensive attitude in a one-sided conversation with his former lover. Journalist and author Mike Marqusee commented in Wicked Messenger: Bob Dylan and the 1960s that although the narrator says that "I really did try to get close to you", "much of the song explains how he really always meant to keep her at a distance". Dylan's biographer Robert Shelton felt that although the song might contain more than one meaning: "On one level, it's the story of a man talking to a girl about the difficulties of intimacy. He also may have been talking to the folk world, a lover that turned on him." Journalist Oliver Trager wrote that it "flies out of the hi-fi speakers like an audio snapshot of a one-sided conversation between a man and woman — the man complaining of the difficulties of intimacy." Trager argues that the song opening, "I didn't mean to treat you so bad" shows that the narrator is aware that he has mistreated the person he is addressing, but that "the hand-washing, Pilate-like excuse that 'You just happened to be there, that's all' suggests that this destructive personality has no intention or ability of limiting his continued abuse." In contrast to this interpretation, musicologist Wilfrid Mellers suggested that "the music attests that he is sad to have caused pain, that he really did 'try to get close to you'". Marqusee concludes that the song is "a study in mutual immaturity ... [in which] Dylan is not and never has been what he's pretending to be: in command of his emotions and purposes". Lucy Harborn in Far Out opined that Dylan's behavior in the song equated to gaslighting.

== Critical comments ==
Cash Box described the single as a "raunchy, low-down romantic lament" delivered with emotion. Record World called it "a typical Dylan love ode" in which "he and the girl-of-the-moment are breaking up." Dave Marsh, who listed the single as among the 1001 greatest ever made, wrote in 1999 that it was difficult to understand how it could "flop so badly".

Several contemporary UK reviews were negative, particularly with respect to Dylan's singing. Maureen Cleave dismissed the song as "Quite the worst record that he, or anybody else, has ever made." She criticized the "irritating tinkly accompaniment and lyrics that are a constant embarrassment". The Evening Post review suggested that the track lacked quality and commented on what Dylan's apparent lack of effort on vocals, which was described as "just a groaning noise". The Liverpool Echo commented on Dylan's "curiously exaggerated vocal delivery ... [and] sarcastic voice" and concluded that he was not a capable vocalist. Other reviewers were less scathing. In the Record Mirror review of Blonde on Blonde, Norman Jopling noted that the song had been Dylan's least successful single in the United Kingdom, and compared his vocals on it to Yogi Bear, but felt that it was "very dramatic and under-rated." The Bucks Examiner found that the song "sounds pretty involved at a first hearing" and was inferior to its B-Side, but improved with repeated listenings.

Retrospective reviews have been very positive, with Griffin's piano playing often highlighted for praise. Michael Gray felt that the constant rising and falling of the music coupled with Dylan's delivery of words, like "pers-on-al" and "un-der-stood", combined to produce an impressive "musical whole". Neil Spencer awarded the song 5/5 stars in an Uncut magazine Dylan supplement in 2015. It was described as "a grand, stately number, propelled by some wonderful piano-organ interplay" by author John Nogowski, who rated the song as "A". Music historians Philippe Margotin and Jean-Michel Guesdon, although describing it as "a very good song", wrote that the performance "lacks rhythmic rigor" and was somewhat careless, and suggest that Dylan and Robertson's guitars were not properly tuned. They highlighted Griffin's piano playing as "excellent".

Al Kooper also praised Griffin's performance, calling it "quite magnificent" and adding that "it influenced me enormously as a pianist". Critic Jonathan Singer gives Griffin's piano playing credit for binding the song together: "At the chorus, Griffin unleashes a symphony; hammering his way up and down the keyboard, half Gershwin, half gospel, all heart. The follow-up, a killer left hand figure that links the chorus to the verse, releases none of the song's tension."

== Personnel ==
The personnel for the original album session were as follows.

Musicians

- Bob Dylan – vocals, electric guitar, harmonica
- Robbie Robertson – electric guitar
- Al Kooper – organ
- Paul Griffin – piano
- Rick Danko – electric bass
- Bobby Gregg – drums

Technical

- Bob Johnston – production

== Live performances ==
According to Dylan's official website, as of 2023 he has performed "One of Us Must Know (Sooner or Later)" 60 times in concert, with all performances occurring between 1976 and 1997. He first performed it on May 19, 1976, in Wichita, Kansas during the second part of the Rolling Thunder Revue, and next played it live during his 1978 World Tour. His two most recent concert performances were during 1997.
