= From a Buick 8 =

2002 novel by Stephen King

- Hardcover first edition cover
- Author: Stephen King
- Language: English
- Genre: Horror
- Publisher: Scribner
- Publication date: September 24, 2002
- Publication place: United states
- Media type: Print (hardcover)
- Pages: 468
- ISBN: 978-0-7432-1137-6

From a Buick 8 is a horror novel by American writer Stephen King. Published on September 24, 2002, this is the second novel by King to be centred around a car (the first one being Christine which, like this novel, is set in Western Pennsylvania). The title comes from Bob Dylan's song "From a Buick 6".

== Background ==
King conceived the idea for the novel as a result of an incident in March 1999. Driving back alone to Maine after spending the winter in Florida, he stopped at a gas station, went to the bathroom at the back of the building, slipped on ice, fell down a bank and almost fell into a swollen stream. This gave him the idea for the gas-station incident in From a Buick Eight, and he came up with the rest of the story during the drive home. He finished the first draft in two months, but was struck by a car in June, and stopped work on From a Buick Eight for the next two years. Completed after his recovery, amid rumours of his retirement, the book has been seen as an attempt to cope with "the senselessness" of his near-fatal accident as well as that of the 9/11 attacks.

== Plot ==
The novel takes the form of a series of recollections by the members of Troop D, a Pennsylvania State Police barracks in Western Pennsylvania. After a drunk driver kills Curtis Wilcox, a well-liked member of Troop D, his son Ned begins to visit the barracks. The cops, the dispatcher, and the custodian quickly take a liking to the boy, and when Ned expresses curiosity about an old car in a nearby storage shed, they tell him about the Buick 8.

The Buick 8, a vintage blue 1953 Buick Roadmaster, has been in storage since 1979, when it was left at a gas station by a mysterious driver, who then disappeared without trace. After inspecting the car, the troopers at the scene (including Curtis Wilcox) conclude that it is not a car at all. Although it looks like a Buick Roadmaster (with some unusual features, such as an uneven number of portholes), the steering wheel is immobile, the dashboard instruments are useless props, the engine has no moving parts, the ignition wires go nowhere, the car repairs itself when damaged and it repels all dirt or debris.

Sandy Dearborn, now Sergeant Commanding of Troop D, is the main narrator, and tells Ned the story of the Buick and Wilcox's fascination with it. Periodically, the car is subject to what the troopers call "lightquakes"—extended, unexplained events accompanied by violent flashes of purple light. The temperature in the shed fluctuates around these events. The Buick has also "given birth" to a number of alien plants and creatures, which die or decompose rapidly after they appear, including a sentient, telepathic creature, which the troopers kill out of fear and disgust. Moreover, two people have disappeared in the vicinity of the car—Wilcox's former partner Ennis Rafferty, as well as an escaped prisoner named Brian Lippy. It is implied that the Buick may be a portal between our world and another.

After hearing the story of the Buick, which has been kept secret by Troop D, Ned becomes convinced that the car is linked to his father's death. A number of apparent coincidences lead him to this conclusion; including the fact that the drunk driver who killed Wilcox was the same gas station attendant who first reported the Buick in 1979. Sandy cautions Ned to keep from obsessing over the Buick, but one evening, having left Ned at the Troop D barracks, he realizes that Ned is determined to destroy the Buick, and fears for the boy's safety.

Sandy returns to the shed to find Ned sitting in the Buick, which has been doused in gasoline, holding a pistol and a match. Just as Sandy pulls Ned out, the portal concealed inside the Buick begins to draw both Ned and Sandy inside. Their friends manage to pull them free, but not before Sandy glimpses the world on the other side of the Buick, and sees Lippy's swastika necklace and cowboy boots, along with Ennis's Stetson hat and Ruger revolver.

There follows one last story, revealing that destroying the Buick has actually been discussed before. However, the troopers have come to believe that the Buick functions as a sort of regulator valve between the worlds and that destroying it might do more harm than good. They decide that it is safest to watch over the Buick and observe in the hope that whatever energy it possesses will eventually dissipate and expire.

The final section comes after a passage of several years. Eddie Jacubois, one of the troopers, has taken his own life, and Ned has become a state trooper. One day, Ned shows Sandy the Buick; there is now a crack in the windshield that has not repaired itself. The remaining troopers realize that whatever was sustaining the Buick is finally spent and that sooner or later, it will eventually fall apart.

== Themes ==
Darker and quieter than King's other books, From a Buick 8 has been called "nihilistic". Reactor describes some of the themes as being: "the failures of writing, the failures of story, and the failures of fiction." Reviewers have commented that the story of the Buick may serve as a metaphor for King's own sense of mortality, and "a response to 9/11".

== Reception ==
Appearing for only one week at Number 1 of the New York Times bestseller list, the book received a mixed reception. Although often quoted as a favourite by other novelists in the genre, reviewers were divided on the novel's perceived lack of closure, its lack of narrative tension and its focus on everyday characters. Kirkus Reviews criticized what it referred to as the: "endless police procedure and some of the most truly dull characters this side of a 1930s Soviet proletariat play," while the New York Times called it: "a King novel to read for voice and atmosphere, not plot," and Reactor called it: "the best Stephen King novel of the last ten years."

== Adaptation ==
In 2005, Chesapeake Films announced that George A. Romero would direct a motion picture adaptation of From a Buick 8, but production stalled in 2009. In 2018 it was announced that an adaptation was in development with William Brent Bell as director and writer. In December 2019, Thomas Jane announced that he would be teaming up for the adaptation of this movie. On an August 2020 episode of The Kingcast podcast, Thomas Jane said that Jim Mickle had signed on to direct. In 2024 it was announced that James Wan had acquired the rights and would now be working on the project.
