= From a Buick 6 =

- US single picture sleeve

Single by Bob Dylan

from the album Highway 61 Revisited
- A-side: "Positively 4th Street"
- Released: September 7, 1965
- Recorded: July 30, 1965
- Studio: Columbia, New York City
- Genre: Blues; folk rock; garage rock
- Length: 3:19
- Label: Columbia
- Songwriter: Bob Dylan
- Producer: Bob Johnston

Bob Dylan singles chronology
"Like a Rolling Stone" (1965)	"From a Buick 6" (1965)	"Can You Please Crawl Out Your Window?" (1965)

Audio sample
- file; help

"From a Buick 6" is a song by Bob Dylan from his album Highway 61 Revisited, which was also released as a single on the B-side of "Positively 4th Street". It was recorded on July 30, 1965.

== Musical style ==
The song is a raucous blues song played recklessly by a band that included Al Kooper on organ and Mike Bloomfield on guitar. The guitar part is patterned after older blues riffs by Robert Johnson, Charlie Patton and Big Joe Williams. It also features a backbeat from drummer Bobby Gregg, a bass line from Harvey Brooks, and a soaring harmonica break. The song starts with a snare shot that is similar to the opening song of Highway 61 Revisited, "Like a Rolling Stone". It is essentially a 12-bar blues pattern, played with power chords, and is notable for Brooks' almost indiscernible substitution of an F in the tenth bar of all but the first verses, while the guitar and organ play the G-chord.

The song is partially based on Sleepy John Estes' 1930 song "Milk Cow Blues", even taking a few lyrics from the older song, but its approach is more similar to The Kinks' version of a Kokomo Arnold song that was also called "Milk Cow Blues".

Cash Box described it as a "rollicking, fast-moving blues-drenched folk rocker."

== Legacy ==
- "From a Buick 6" has been covered by musicians such as Gary U.S. Bonds, Mitch Ryder, Treat Her Right, Died Pretty, Mike Wilhelm, Alex Taylor and Johnny Winter.
- G. E. Smith performed "From a Buick 6" with Booker T. & The M.G.'s during the tribute concert for Dylan's 30th anniversary as a recording artist on October 16, 1992, at Madison Square Gardens in New York City.
- The name of a 2002 novel by Stephen King, From a Buick 8 is adapted from the title of this song.
- The Billy Bragg song "From a Vauxhall Velox" on the 1984 album Brewing Up with Billy Bragg was written as a response to "From a Buick 6".
