= Can You Please Crawl Out Your Window? =

Song written by Bob Dylan

- Dutch picture sleeve

Single by Bob Dylan
- B-side: "Highway 61 Revisited"
- Released: December 21, 1965
- Recorded: November 30, 1965
- Genre: Folk rock
- Length: 3:32
- Label: Columbia
- Songwriter: Bob Dylan
- Producer: Bob Johnston

Bob Dylan singles chronology
"Positively 4th Street" (1965)	"Can You Please Crawl Out Your Window?" (1965)	"One of Us Must Know (Sooner or Later)" (1966)

"Can You Please Crawl Out Your Window?" is a folk rock song written by the American musician Bob Dylan. In 1965, Columbia Records released it as a single, which reached number 58 on the US Billboard Hot 100 chart, and number 17 on the UK chart in January 1966. While Dylan never included the song on any of his studio albums, it appears on compilations, such as Biograph and Side Tracks.

== Recording ==
The official single version, with the Hawks, is generally considered to have been recorded on November 30, 1965, although at least one Dylan scholar contends that the recording date was October 5. Dylan is accompanied on the song by the musical group then known as the Hawks, who would back the singer on his 1966 world tour and subsequently go on to fame in their own right as the Band: Robbie Robertson on guitar, Rick Danko on bass, Levon Helm on drums, Richard Manuel on piano, and Garth Hudson on organ.

The entire July 1965 and October/November 1965 recording sessions were released on the 18-disc Collector's Edition of The Bootleg Series Vol. 12: The Cutting Edge 1965–1966 in 2015, while highlights from the outtakes appeared on the 2-disc and 6-disc versions of that album.

== Releases and reception ==
Prior to the release by Dylan, the Vacels, a group from Long Island, New York, recorded a version that was released as a single in October 1965, by Kama Sutra Records.

Dylan's version was released on December 21, 1965 and was originally available as a single only, with it eventually being included (in its original mono form) on Dylan's compilations Masterpieces (1978) and Biograph (1985), and on the Band's box set A Musical History (2005). An extended stereo mix of the original single version appeared on the limited Collector's Edition of The Bootleg Series Vol. 12: The Cutting Edge 1965–1966 (2015).

Billboard described the song as "more strong folk-rock Dylan material which will have no trouble finding its way up the singles chart" and also praised the "strong material and performance." Cash Box described it as a "medium-paced funky, blues-drenched folk-rocker which effectively builds to an exciting pulsating crescendo." Cash Box described the version by the Vacels as a "hard-driving, bluesy message-song which utilizes some vastly different but interesting melodic constructions."

Dylan allegedly played the song to fellow folk artist Phil Ochs as the two were riding in a limousine. When Ochs expressed a lukewarm feeling about the piece, Dylan ejected him from his limousine, yelling "You're not a folk singer. You're a journalist."

1966 charts
Chart (1966)	Peak position
Canada Top Singles (RPM)	23
UK Singles (Official Charts)	17
US Billboard Hot 100	58

== Jimi Hendrix version ==
Prior to joining the Experience, Jimi Hendrix became interested in the song. Jimmy Mayes, who played drums with Joey Dee and the Starliters (who Hendrix also played with for a short time), recalled Hendrix practiced "Can You Please Crawl Out Your Window?" incessantly: "I think Jimi was trying to get his vocals together, but he used to get on my nerves with these different songs. After a while, I told him I don't want to hear no more of this Bob Dylan music." Later with the Experience, Hendrix performed the song live several times. A recording by the BBC is included on his album BBC Sessions. In an album review, critic Cub Koda calls it an "oddball cover".
