= Queen Jane Approximately =

Single by Bob Dylan

from the album Highway 61 Revisited
- A-side: "One of Us Must Know (Sooner or Later)"
- Released: August 30, 1965
- Recorded: August 2, 1965
- Studio: Columbia, New York City
- Genre: Folk rock; garage rock
- Length: 5:19
- Label: Columbia
- Songwriter: Bob Dylan
- Producer: Bob Johnston

"Queen Jane Approximately" is a song from Bob Dylan's 1965 album Highway 61 Revisited. It was released as a single as the B-side to "One of Us Must Know (Sooner or Later)" in January 1966. It has also been covered by several artists, including the Grateful Dead and The Four Seasons.

== Meaning ==
Similar to other Dylan songs of this period, "Queen Jane Approximately" has the singer criticizing the subject of the song, warning her of an imminent fall from grace. Although the song covers similar ground to "Like a Rolling Stone", "Queen Jane Approximately" is gentler and shows the subject some compassion. The main point of criticism is that the subject lives in an inauthentic world filled with superficial attitudes and people and meaningless, ritualized proprieties. However, the singer also invites the subject to come and see him if and when she is willing to break away from her superficial diversions and engage in an honest, authentic experience, or when she needs someone to ultimately pick up the pieces.

The song is structured in five verses, in which the first two deal with Queen Jane's relationship with her family, the second two deal with her relationship with her "courtiers" and the last deals with her relationship with bandits. This structure essentially maps out a path from those closest to her to a way out of her current situation, preparing for the last lines of the fifth verse where the narrator offers "And you want somebody you don't have to speak to / Won't you come see me Queen Jane?" The song incorporates several attitudes towards the subject, including condescension, self-righteousness, contempt, compassion as well as sneering.

Cash Box described Dylan's version as a "medium-paced, twangy heart-breaker." Cash Box described a cover version by the Daily Flash as a "funky, infectious, haunting reading of Dylan’s image filled tale of the travails of a young girl and a guy’s everlasting devotion."

=== Identity of Queen Jane ===
One of the persistent questions about the song is the identity of the Queen Jane to whom the title refers. Speculation about the subject has included the Tudor queens Lady Jane Grey and Jane Seymour. Even more speculation has centered on Joan Baez, as the similarity of the names "Jane" and "Joan" allow the name 'Jane' to be a thinly veiled attempt to hide Baez's identity, Dylan's and Baez's reputations as the king and queen of folk music, and the souring of the relationship between Dylan and Baez around the time the song was written. However, in 1965 Dylan himself told journalist Nora Ephron that "Queen Jane is a man".

== Style ==
The lyrics are structured as a series of ABAB quatrain verses, with each verse followed by a chorus that is just a repeat of the last line of the verse, which is always "won't you come see me Queen Jane". Each B line ends with a rhyme on "ain", while the A lines each end with a double-syllable rhyme, such as "cheek to / speak to" or "lent you / resent you". The music is recorded with a "warts and all" philosophy consistent with the rest of the Highway 61 Revisited album. The electric guitar is out of tune and clashes with the organ and piano chords, the bass has Spanish inflections, and the mix is raw with a sound similar to garage rock. Musicians on "Queen Jane Approximately" include Dylan, Mike Bloomfield on electric guitars and Al Kooper and Paul Griffin on keyboards.

== Live performances ==
Despite being originally recorded in 1965, Dylan did not perform the song live until July 4, 1987, during a concert with the Grateful Dead. A performance of the song from July 19, 1987, was officially released on the live album Dylan & The Dead. As of 2019, Dylan has performed the song 76 times, most recently on November 6, 2013, in Rome, Italy. In a 2005 poll of artists reported in Mojo, "Queen Jane Approximately" was listed as the number 70 all-time best Bob Dylan song.
