= Mike Marqusee =

American writer, journalist, and political activist (1953–2015)

Mike Marqusee (/ˈmɑːrkəsi/; 27 January 1953 – 13 January 2015) was an American writer, journalist, and political activist in London.

== Life and career ==
"Both in the eloquence of his writing and the deep humanism of his vision, Mike Marqusee stands shoulder to shoulder with the spirits of Isaac Deutscher and Edward Said."

— Mike Davis, author of City of Quartz

Marqusee's first published work was the essay "Turn Left at Scarsdale", written when he was a sixteen-year-old high school student in New York and included in the 1970 collection "High School Revolutionaries". Marqusee, who described himself as a "deracinated New York Marxist Jew", lived in Britain from 1971.

He wrote mainly about politics, popular culture, the Indian sub-continent and cricket, and was a regular correspondent for, among others, The Guardian, Red Pepper, and The Hindu. After he was diagnosed with multiple myeloma in 2007, he wrote extensively on health issues, and in defence of the National Health Service. His book The Price of Experience: Writings on Living with Cancer was published in 2014.

Marqusee was the editor of Labour Left Briefing, an executive member of the Stop the War Coalition and the Socialist Alliance, and wrote for Left Unity. He was also a leading figure in Iraq Occupation Focus. In 2014, he was working on a proposed biography of the writers Tom Paine and William Blake.

=== Sports writing ===
An ardent sports fan, Marqusee won considerable renown for his work on cricket. War Minus the Shooting, his book on the 1996 Cricket World Cup, has been lauded as a "riveting, revelatory and largely run-free account". Rob Steen wrote that, before it was published, "observations of subcontinental cricket emanating from Britain, and just about every other corner of the so-called old world, tended to be clichéd, wrongheaded, derisive, patronising or just plain racist. Small wonder, then, that it took a London-based American with a rucksack, a notebook and a CLR Jamesian yen for Marxism to supply an overdue corrective." Duncan Campbell of The Guardian wrote: "One of the best books ever written on cricket, Anyone But England, is by an American writer, Mike Marqusee."

== Personal life ==
Marqusee's partner was Liz Davies, a barrister. He died in January 2015, aged 61, of multiple myeloma.

== Partial works ==
- Slow Turn (Sphere, 1988) ISBN 978-0-7474-0120-9
- Defeat from the Jaws of Victory: Inside Kinnock's Labour Party (co-author with Richard Heffernan) (Verso Books, 1992). ISBN 978-0-86091-561-4
- War Minus the Shooting: A Journey through South Asia during Cricket's World Cup (Mandarin, 1997). ISBN 978-0-7493-2333-2
- Chimes of Freedom: the Politics of Bob Dylan's Art (The New Press, 2003). ISBN 978-1-56584-825-2
- Anyone but England: An Outsider Looks at English Cricket (Aurum Press, 2005), ISBN 978-1-84513-084-8
- Redemption Song: Muhammad Ali and the Spirit of the Sixties (Verso Books, 2005). ISBN 978-1-84467-527-2
- Wicked Messenger: Bob Dylan and the Sixties (Seven Stories Press, 2006). ISBN 978-1-58322-686-5.
- "Imperial Whitewash – Feelgood Versions of British History Are Blinding Us to the Ways in Which We Are Even Now Repeating It", The Guardian, 31 July 2006
- If I Am Not for Myself: Journey of an Anti-Zionist Jew (Verso, 2008). An extract appeared in The Guardian.
- "Why I Became British" (The Guardian, 16 February 2010)
- "I Don't Need a War to Fight My Cancer" (The Guardian, 28 December 2009)
- Street Music: Poems (Clissold Books, 2012).
- The Price of Experience: Writings on Living with Cancer (OR Books, 2014)
- "Fifty Years of Bob Dylan's Stark Challenge to Liberal Complacency" (The Guardian, February 2014).
