= Joseph Arthur discography =

This page lists albums, EPs, singles and compilations by musician Joseph Arthur.

== Studio albums ==
- Big City Secrets
  - Real World Records, March 11, 1997
- Come to Where I'm From
  - Real World Records/Virgin Records, April 11, 2000
- Redemption's Son
  - Real World Records (UK), May 20, 2002
  - Enjoy Records (US), November 5, 2002
- Our Shadows Will Remain
  - Vector Recordings (US), September 28, 2004
  - 14th Floor Records (UK), July 11, 2005
- Nuclear Daydream
  - Lonely Astronaut Records, September 19, 2006
- The Graduation Ceremony
  - Lonely Astronaut Records, May 23, 2011
- Redemption City
  - Lonely Astronaut Records, January 18, 2012
- The Ballad of Boogie Christ
  - Lonely Astronaut Records (US), June 11, 2013
- The Ballad of Boogie Christ Act II
  - Lonely Astronaut Records (US), November 29, 2013
- The Ballad of Boogie Christ Acts I & II
  - Real World Records (UK)/Republic Records (US), September 9, 2013
- Lou: The Songs of Lou Reed
  - Vanguard Records, May 13, 2014
- Days of Surrender
  - self-released, May 26, 2015
- The Family
  - Real World Records, June 3, 2016
- Come Back World
  - Moonage Rebel Records, October 11, 2019

=== Joseph Arthur & The Lonely Astronauts ===
- Let's Just Be
  - Lonely Astronaut Records, April 17, 2007
- Temporary People
  - Lonely Astronaut Records, September 30, 2008

=== Arthur Buck ===
(Joseph Arthur and Peter Buck)

- Arthur Buck
  - New West Records, June 15, 2018
- Arthur Buck 2
  - October 3, 2025

== EPs ==
- Cut and Blind (August 1996)
- Vacancy (May 11, 1999)
- Junkyard Hearts I (February 15, 2002)
- Junkyard Hearts II (February 28, 2002)
- Junkyard Hearts III (March 15, 2002)
- Junkyard Hearts IV (March 28, 2002)
- And the Thieves Are Gone (December 7, 2004)
- Could We Survive (March 18, 2008)
- Crazy Rain (April 15, 2008)
- Vagabond Skies (June 10, 2008)
- Foreign Girls (July 8, 2008)

== Others ==
- Holding the Void (side project with Pat Sansone and Rene Lopez) (2003)
- The Invisible Parade (CD) & We Almost Made It (art book) (May 18, 2006)
- iTunes Live from Montreal (recorded live in October 2008; iTunes exclusive) (April 21, 2009)
- As I Call You Down (debut album by Fistful of Mercy, a side project with Ben Harper and Dhani Harrison) (October 5, 2010)
- Acts (debut album by RNDM, a side project with Jeff Ament and Richard Stuverud) (October 30, 2012)
- Ghost Riding (album by RNDM) (March 4, 2016)

== Singles ==
- "Mercedes" (PROMO ONLY) (1996)
- "Daddy's on Prozac" (PROMO ONLY) (1997)
- "Chemical" (June 26, 2000)
- "In the Sun" (April 23, 2001)
- "Exhausted" (PROMO ONLY) (2001)
- "In the Night" (PROMO ONLY) (July 8, 2002)
- "I Would Rather Hide" (PROMO ONLY) (2002)
- "Honey and the Moon" (PROMO ONLY) (January 2003)
- "Nation of Slaves" (PROMO ONLY) (2003)
- "All of Our Hands" (May 23, 2005)
- "Can't Exist" (July 4, 2005)
- "Even Tho" (September 26, 2005)
- "Devil's Broom" (February 13, 2006)
- "Can't Exist" (re-issue) (May 1, 2006)
- "Honey and the Moon" (new radio edit) (March 26, 2007)
- "Enough to Get Away" (August 27, 2007)
- "Faith"/"Look Into the Sky" (PROMO ONLY) (December 15, 2008)
- "Travel As Equals" (April 21, 2012)

== Music videos ==
Year	Video	Director	Link
1996	"Daddy's on Prozac"	Zachary Larner	YouTube
2000	"Chemical"	Anton Corbijn	
2000	"In the Sun"	Anton Corbijn	
2000	"History"	Joseph Daniel Lewis	YouTube
2003	"Let's Embrace"	Adria Petty and Anna Gabriel	Yahoo! Music
2004	"All of Our Hands"	Chad Reddell	Yahoo! Music
2004	"Wild Horses" (Faultline featuring Joseph Arthur)	Borkur Sigthorsson	
2005	"Can't Exist"	Noaz Deshe	Yahoo! Music
2005	"Even Tho"	Noaz Deshe and David Incorvaia	YouTube
2006	"Devil's Broom"	Noaz Deshe	Yahoo! Music
2007	"Slide Away"	(director unlisted)	YouTube
2007	"Diamond Ring"	Anna Gabriel	YouTube
2008	"Second Sight"	Gabriel Judet-Weinshel	YouTube
2008	"She Paints Me Gold"	Cerise Leang and Joseph Arthur	YouTube
2008	"Temporary People"	Cerise Leang	YouTube
2008	"Faith"	Stephen Shellenberger	YouTube
2010	"Love Never Asks You to Lie"	SBG Media	YouTube

== Promo CDs ==
- "Chaos and Beauty" (Live at La Laiterie, Strasbourg, France, on November 17, 1996) - Real World promo, 1997
  1. "Big City Secret" (Live)
  2. "Good About Me" (Live)
  3. "Crying Like a Man" (Live)
- "New Morning" (Live at New Morning, Paris, France, on February 5, 1997) - Real World promo, 1997
  1. "Mercedes" (Live)
  2. "Good About Me" (Live)
  3. "Big City Secret" (Live)
- "Rusty Water" (early version of Come to Where I'm From) - Virgin promo, 1999
- "The Black Sessions EP" (Live at Rockstation, Montpelier, France, on November 23, 1999) - Sargo promo, 2000
  1. "Still the Same" (Live)
  2. "Mercedes" (Live)
  3. "Big City Secret" (Live)
  4. "In the Sun" (Live)
  5. "Prison" (Live)
- "Live at the ASCAP Cafe" (Live at the Sundance Film Festival with Peter Gabriel, January 22, 2000) - Virgin promo, 2000
  1. "I Donated Myself to the Mexican Army" (Live)
  2. "In the Sun" (Live)
  3. "Mercedes" (Live)
  4. "Invisible Hands" (Live)
  5. "Prison" (Live)
- "Live at the Gypsy Tea Room" (Dallas, Texas, June 19, 2000) - Virgin promo, 2000
  1. "History" (Live) – 4:20
  2. "Big City Secret" (Live) – 10:31
  3. "Exhausted" (Live) – 3:36
  4. "Invisible Hands" (Live) – 9:52
  5. "I Donated Myself to the Mexican Army" (Live) – 5:16
  6. "In the Sun" (Live) – 5:28
  7. "Prison" (Live) – 13:42
- "Live at KACD 103.1" (recorded live on July 26, 2000) - Virgin promo, 2000
  1. (Interview)
  2. "In the Sun" (Live)
  3. (Interview)
  4. "Tattoo" (Live)
  5. (Interview)
- "Live at Soundbreak.com" (recorded live on September 8, 2000) - Virgin promo, 2000
  1. "Tattoo" (Live)
  2. (Interview)
  3. "Redemption's Son" (Live)
  4. (Interview)
  5. "In the Sun" (Live)
  6. (Interview)
  7. "I Donated Myself to the Mexican Army" (Live)
  8. (Interview)
  9. "Invisible Hands" (Live)
  10. (Interview)
- "I Am a Great Person Even Though I Am a Snake" - Virgin promo, 2002
  1. "Honey and the Moon" (Live Acoustic)
  2. "Redemption's Son" (Live Acoustic)
  3. "I Donated Myself to the Mexican Army" (Live Acoustic)
  4. "History" (Live)
  5. "In the Sun" (Live)
- "Are You With Us?" (early version of Redemption's Son) - Virgin promo, 2002
- "Crazy Rain / Vagabond Skies / Foreign Girls" (combines the 3 EPs onto one 20-track CD-R acetate with unique packaging artwork) - Lonely Astronaut promo, 2008
- "The Black Sessions EP" (Live in Paris: recorded on June 24, 2008, broadcast on September 29, 2008) - Sangatte Records promo, 2008
  1. "Turn You On" (Live)
  2. "Dead Savior" (Live)
  3. "Faith" (Live)
  4. "King of the Pavement" (Live)
  5. "Temporary People" (Live)
  6. "Honey and the Moon" (Live)
  7. "Redemption's Son" (Live)
  8. "A Smile That Explodes" (Live)
  9. "Black Lexus" (Live)

== Song appearances in television and film ==
Joseph Arthur soundtracked the 1998 film Hell's Kitchen, as well as making a cameo appearance in the film. Joseph also provided three songs for the 2006 documentary Deliver Us from Evil. Joseph starred as a character's father in the 1999 film The Dream Catcher, though he did not provide any music to the soundtrack. Many of his songs have made appearances in film and television:

- "Mercedes"
  - Searching for Debra Winger (2002)
- "Porcupine"
  - The Bumblebee Flies Anyway (1999)
- "Bed of Nails"
  - The Bone Collector (1999)
- "In the Sun"
  - The Bourne Identity (2002)
  - Wasted (2002)
  - Saved! (2004)
  - Scrubs (2006)
  - Dawson's Creek
  - Grey's Anatomy
  - The L Word
  - Laguna Beach
  - Life
  - Advert for "Echo" by Davidoff
- "Chemical"
  - Rennie's Landing (Stealing Time) (2001)
  - Shallow Hal (2001)
- "Exhausted"
  - Long Way Down (first aired October 28, 2007 through December 2, 2007)
- "Honey and the Moon"
  - The O.C. (2003)
  - American Wedding (2003)
  - As the World Turns
  - Without a Trace
  - Dawson's Creek
  - October Road
  - Perfect Romance
- "Stumble and Pain"
  - True Blood (episode "Strange Love," first aired September 7, 2008)
- "A Smile That Explodes"
  - The O.C.
- "My Home Is Your Head"
  - House M.D. (episode "Ugly," first aired November 13, 2007)
- "You're So True"
  - Shrek 2 (2004)
- "Electrical Storm"
  - 3 lbs.
- "Could We Survive"
  - House M.D. (episode "Lucky Thirteen," first aired October 21, 2008)
  - Friday Night Lights (episode "The Giving Tree," first aired December 10, 2008)
- "Walk Away"
  - Lie to Me (episode "Undercover," first aired April 29, 2009)
  - Hung (episode "Do it, Monkey!" first aired August 2, 2009; song also appears on Hung soundtrack)
- "Killer's Knife"
  - Numb3rs (episode "7 Men Out," first aired October 9, 2009)

== Unreleased songs ==
Joseph Arthur has an expanding catalog of songs that have yet to be officially released. These songs have either been only played live, or were recorded and put up on either his website, MySpace page, or his Tumblr blog page Bag Is Hot. The list of unreleased songs can be found on the definitive fan website lonelyastronauts.com.

== Cover songs ==
Below is a list of covers that Joseph has performed (taken from the fan website lonelyastronauts.com):

- "Across the Universe" (The Beatles)
- "After the Gold Rush" (Neil Young)
- "Baby I Need Your Lovin'" (The Four Tops)
- "Born in the U.S.A." (Bruce Springsteen)
- "Brass in Pocket" (The Pretenders)
- "Dearest Darlin'" (Bo Diddley)
- "Going Blind" (Kiss)
- "Hallelujah" (Leonard Cohen)
- "Imagine" (John Lennon)
- "Little Drummer Boy" (Harry Simeone)
- "Little Sister" (Elvis Presley)
- "Look at Me" (John Lennon)
- "Miss You" (The Rolling Stones)
- "Pale Blue Eyes" (The Velvet Underground)
- "Ramble On" (Led Zeppelin)
- "Shock Me" (Kiss)
- "Shock the Monkey" (Peter Gabriel)
- "Step Into the Light" (The Afghan Whigs)
- "Sweet Black Angel" (The Rolling Stones)
- "Ten Crack Commandments" (Notorious B.I.G.)
- "There Is a Light That Never Goes Out" (The Smiths)
- "TV Eye" (The Stooges)
- "Up to Me" (Bob Dylan)
- "Venus in Furs" (The Velvet Underground)
- "Viva Las Vegas" (Elvis Presley)
- "Whatever You Like" (T.I.)
- "Wild Horses" (The Rolling Stones)
- "You Can't Put Your Arms Around a Memory" (Johnny Thunders)

== Contributions ==
- "Build Back Up" from Wish You Were Here: Love Songs for New York, a September 11, 2001 benefit album (2002)
- "You're So True" from the Shrek 2 soundtrack (2004)
- "There Is a Light That Never Goes Out" (The Smiths cover) on the Starbucks compilation album Sweetheart 2005: Love Songs (2005)
- "Look at Me" (John Lennon cover) on the Q magazine compilation album Lennon Covered (2005)
- "Hallelujah" (Leonard Cohen cover), "Cathedral" (a.k.a. "Chapter 1") and "Pyramids" (a.k.a. "Chapter 8") from the documentary Deliver Us from Evil (2006)
- "Coast of High Barbary" from Rogue's Gallery: Pirate Ballads, Sea Songs, and Chanteys (2006)
- "Crying Like a Man" from Live from the Artists Den 's third volume of live performances from their concert series (2006)
- "Last Train to Ithaca" (given away as a free download on Joseph's website for the benefit of Hurricane Katrina victims) (2006)
- "A River Blue" (written for Uganda LRA victims and the "A River Blue" project) (2006)
- "Step Into the Light" (The Afghan Whigs cover) on the Afghan Whigs tribute album Summer's Kiss: A Tribute to The Afghan Whigs (2009)

== Contributions to other artists' projects ==
=== As record producer ===
- Come Down by Tara Angell (February 22, 2005)
- Here, There and Anymore by Greg Connors (September 25, 2006)

=== As guest musician ===
- Soularium by Sister Soleil (July 14, 1998)
  - Co-wrote and played guitar, bass, and sang backing vocals on "Butterfly"
- Righteous Love by Joan Osborne (September 12, 2000)
  - Played acoustic guitar on "Make You Feel My Love" (Bob Dylan cover)
  - Co-writer of "Righteous Love" and "If I Was Your Man"
- Your Love Means Everything by Faultline (May 17, 2004)
  - Co-produced, played guitar, keyboards and percussion, and sang lead and backing vocals on "Wild Horses" (The Rolling Stones cover)
- Powder Burns by The Twilight Singers (May 16, 2006)
  - Sang backing vocals on "There's Been an Accident" and "Forty Dollars"
  - Sang backing vocals and played Dobro on "The Conversation"
- Real Life by Joan as Police Woman (June 12, 2006)
  - Played the Moog Rogue synthesizer on "Eternal Flame" (and the bonus disc track and B-side "Endless Supply of Poison")
  - Played drums and piano on "Feed the Light"
  - Played piano, Moog Rogue synth, and sang backing vocals on "Christobel"
- Caroline Glass and Friends EP by Caroline Glass (October 24, 2006)
  - Sang backing vocals on "In Limbo"
- A Stitch in Time (EP) by The Twilight Singers (December 4, 2006)
  - Co-wrote, sang backing vocals, and played guitar on "Sublime"
- The Ideal Condition by Paul Hartnoll (May 28, 2007)
  - Co-wrote and sang vocals on "Aggro"
- Canon by Ani DiFranco (September 11, 2007)
  - Sang backing vocals on "Napoleon" (new version)
- Saturnalia by The Gutter Twins (March 4, 2008)
  - Joseph along with Jennifer Turner and Greg Wieczorek from The Lonely Astronauts provide backing vocals on "Idle Hands"
- Big Blue Ball released by Real World Records (June 24, 2008)
  - Sang vocals on "Altus Silva" and "Exit Through You"
- Cover by Joan as Police Woman (available only at Joan as Police Woman's live shows starting in September 2009)
  - Joan Wasser singing with Joseph on a cover of T.I.'s "Whatever You Like"
