= Rene Lopez (musician) =

American singer-songwriter

- Born: August 6, 1969 (age 57); The Bronx, New York City
- Genres: Country, Soul, Latin, Rock & Roll, Americana
- Occupations: Singer songwriter, musician
- Instruments: vocals, guitar, drums, bass, timbales.
- Years active: 1980s–present
- Label: Liberation Label
- Website: renelopezmusic.com

Rene Lopez (born August 6, 1969) is an American singer, songwriter and musician. He has toured and recorded extensively with Joseph Arthur, and was the lead singer of the band The Authority, who performed at Lollapalooza and opened shows for Phish, Spin Doctors, and Public Enemy. As a solo artist he has released eight albums, many receiving favorable reviews, and has performed at such venues as the Kennedy Center, Brooklyn Bowl, Rockwood Music Hall, and Nublu.

== Biography ==
Rene Lopez was born August 6, 1969, in the Bronx, the son of an Italian mother and Puerto Rican salsa musician, Rene Lopez Sr., who played trumpet during the heyday of Fania Records with the Ray Barretto Orchestra and Típica 73, bands beloved by New York's Latin community.

As a child, Rene Lopez listened to Led Zeppelin and Prince. Prince influenced his music style of bringing different types of music together. His music genres have been referenced as Americana, Soul, Latin Soul and Country musician and singer-songwriter.

Lopez is the son of salsa musician Rene Lopez Sr.

Rene's band The Authority played gigs alongside P-Funk, The Meters, and Fishbone. Later, Rene started the band Wasabi with the John Popper of Blues Traveler. As a solo artist, Lopez has released 8 albums and 4 EPs. He studied with drummer Bernard Purdie (The Beatles, James Brown, Aretha Franklin, The Rolling Stones) who gave Rene his first opportunity to step forward from behind the kit as a singer and songwriter.

NPR's Alt.Latino referred to Rene Lopez's music as one of Alt.Latino's favorites of 2014.

== Discography ==
=== Singles ===
- 2013 - Midnight Love
- 2013 - Brown Eyed Brother
- 2014 - Love Has No Mercy
- 2018 - Borough Girl
- 2018 - Brick Town Kids
- 2019 - Once Again
- 2019 - Nothings Left
- 2019 - Runaway Heart
- 2020 - Get It While You Can
- 2021 - Hasta Luego
- 2021 - Flamingo
- 2021 - Life Ain't Anything Without Love

=== Albums ===
- 1992 - Candyland (with The Authority)
- 2003 - I Know What I See (EP)
- 2005 - One Man's Year
- 2009 - Johnny Wants to Be a Matador (EP)
- 2010 - People Are Just People
- 2011 - E.L.S.
- 2013 - Let's Be Strangers Again (EP)
- 2014 - Love Has No Mercy
- 2014 - Paint The Moon Gold
- 2016 - Holiday Heart
- 2021 - Bet You Thought I'd Die (EP)
- 2022 - Thank God For The Lonely

=== Selected Discograpy ===
- 1999 - Twelve Stories High - Extra Virgin - Vocals, guitar, guitar (acoustic), keyboards, percussion, Sequencing, Guitorgan, Composer
- 2000 - Make a Sound - Eric Schenkman - Congas, vocals
- 2002 - Redemption's Son - Joseph Arthur - Percussion
- 2003 - Holding the Void - Holding the Void - drums
- 2004 - Our Shadows Will Remain - Joseph Arthur - Drums
- 2006 - Nuclear Daydream - Joseph Arthur - Drums
- 2008 - Red Letter Year - Ani DiFranco - Percussion
- 2008 - Vagabond Skies - Joseph Arthur - Drums
- 2024 - Towne and Stevens - Towne and Stevens - Drums, vocals
