= Enough to Get Away =

Single by Joseph Arthur

from the album Nuclear Daydream
- Released: August 27, 2007
- Recorded: 2006
- Genre: Alternative rock
- Length: 2:47
- Label: Lonely Astronaut Records; 14th Floor Records
- Songwriter: Joseph Arthur
- Producer: Joseph Arthur

Joseph Arthur singles chronology
"Honey and the Moon" (2007)	"Enough to Get Away" (2007)

"Enough to Get Away" is the first single from Joseph Arthur's 2006 album Nuclear Daydream. In the US, the album was released on September 19, 2006. In the UK, both Nuclear Daydream and the follow-up album Let's Just Be were released on September 3, 2007. The AA-side "Diamond Ring" is the album version, taken from Let's Just Be. The album version of "Enough to Get Away" also appeared as a B-side to Joseph's 2007 single "Honey and the Moon." The 7" single is pressed on light cream-colored vinyl and is limited edition numbered.

Joseph discussed "Enough to Get Away" in an interview with Newsday:

The first single, "Enough to Get Away," has a sunny sound that masks a darker theme. "I think it's like an attack on the American Dream," said Arthur. "It sounds happy, but there is no 'enough to get away.' When you're writing, you never really know what you're talking about and then you interpret it later. I could never try to write something like that. It just comes out and it's like, 'Whoa, what's this?'"

== Track listing ==
7" vinyl (JA07V):

1. "Enough to Get Away" – 2:47
2. "Diamond Ring" – 3:26

== Notes ==
- "Enough to Get Away" written and produced by Joseph Arthur.
- "Diamond Ring" written by Joseph Arthur and Kraig Jarret Johnson. Produced by Joseph Arthur and The Lonely Astronauts.
