= Jennifer Turner (musician) =

Musician

- Genres: Alternative rock; indie rock
- Instruments: Guitar; bass; vocals
- Years active: 1991–present

Jennifer Turner is an American singer-songwriter, instrumentalist and producer.

== Career ==
=== 1991–1997: session and touring guitar player ===
Turner first became popular for her work writing and touring with Natalie Merchant on her multi-platinum album Tigerlily as guitarist and backing vocalist alongside Peter Yanowitz on drums and Barrie Maguire on bass guitar. She then went on to play acoustic guitar on the Mary J Blige album Share My World. In 1997, Turner was invited by Miles Copeland III to join Soraya's live band on guitar.

=== 1997–2007: lead singer ===
In 1997, Turner formed the band Furslide alongside bassist Jason Lader, and drummer Adam MacDougall and released their album Adventure on Virgin Records, recorded at London's Metropolis, Olympic and Abbey Road studios.

Turner broke from Virgin to form an independent record label, Caboose Music, a subsidiary of the Virgin group. In 2001, using Inner as an alias, she released two records on her own independent record label. Inner's first release was the EP Dog Demos, followed by the full-length album Lovetheonlyway the year after.

=== 2007–present: band member, producer and engineer, actor ===
Through the middle of the 2000s, Turner kept a lower profile, mostly working in bands, but not as frontperson. Starting in 2006, Turner worked with Joseph Arthur and the Lonely Astronauts, played guitar in Santigold's band and joined Here we go magic, playing bass and keyboard. Turner produced and engineered the band's 2010 album Pigeons and The January, a 2011 EP.

The same year, Turner and Henrietta Tiefenthaler, both having a weakness for Krautrock, founded Thrillionaire, with Joey Waronker, Cedric LeMoyne and Marius de Vries taking part.

In 2012, Turner formed Exclamation Pony, consisting of Ryan Jarman as lead guitarist and vocalist, with Jen Turner on bass and vocals, releasing a single on Julian Casablancas' label Cult Records. The same year, Turner played herself in the biopic film Greetings from Tim Buckley.

In 2015 Taylor McLam (drums, vocals) and Chris Traynor (guitar, vocals) started working on music together. Turner (guitar, vocals), Gabriella Da Silva (vocals), Drew Broadrick (piano, vocals) and Sibyl Buck (bass, vocals) joined in, forming High Desert Fires. They released their first EP in 2015. That year, she joined the lineup of The Lemonheads for several tours, garnering rave reviews for 'invigorating the band'. In 2012, the British music magazine NME did a feature on 'dream band line-ups', in which Turner was named as a bass player, one of the few contemporary musicians on the list.

== Discography ==
Furslide

- Adventure (1998)

Inner

- Thedogdemos EP (2001)
- Lovetheonlyway (2002)

Joseph Arthur and the Lonely Astronauts

- Let's Just Be (2007)
- Temporary People (2008)

Here We Go Magic

- Pigeons (2009), also engineer, producer
- The January EP (2011), also engineer, producer
- A Different Ship (2012)

Thrillionaire

- "Wie Geht's?", Single (2013)

Exclamation Pony

- "Pseudo Individual/Mazes", Single (2013)

High Desert Fires

- Light Is the Revelation, EP (2015)

== Collaborations/producer/engineer ==
- Natalie Merchant – Tigerlily (1995), guitar, backing vocals
- Mary J Blige – Share My World (1997), acoustic guitar
- Perry Farrell – Song Yet to Be Sung (2001), guitar
- Gutter Twins – Saturnalia (2008), vocals
- Joseph Arthur – Could We Survive (2008), vocals, and songwriting
- Joseph Arthur – Crazy Rain (2008), vocals, and songwriting
- Teddy Thompson – A Piece of What You Need (2008), backing vocals
- Julian Casablancas – Phrazes for the Young (2009), guitar
- Setting Sun – Fantasurreal (2010), bass, vocals
- Noah and the Whale – Last Night on Earth (2011), backing vocals
- Teen – In Limbo (2012), engineer, contribution of vocals, drums and drum loops
- Setting Sun – Be Here When You Get There (2014), bass
- Katie Burden – My Blind Eye (2014, EP), bass, guitar, songwriting
- Swans – The Glowing Man (2016), engineer
- American Anymen – Start My Center (2016), producer, keyboard, electric guitar
- Katie Burden – Strange Moon (2016), bass, guitar, wurlitzer, mellotron, songwriting
- The Cribs – Night Network (2020), piano
- American Anymen – "No Janitor Could Ever Clean This Mess" (2021, single), electric lead guitar
- The Cribs – Selling a Vibe (2026), bass on "Looking for the Wrong Guy"
