= The Ballad of Boogie Christ =

Studio album by Joseph Arthur
- Released: June 11, 2013
- Studios: Catskill, New York; Old Soul Studios; Brooklyn, New York; Rebel Country; Silverlake, Los Angeles; The Carriage House; Los Angeles; Gnome Gardens; Minneapolis, Minnesota; Flowers Studio
- Genre: Folk rock
- Labels: Real World, Lonely Astronaut Records
- Producers: Joseph Arthur, Kenny Siegal (3, 4, 8, 9), Chris Seefried (1)

Joseph Arthur chronology
Redemption City (2012)	The Ballad of Boogie Christ (2013)	The Ballad of Boogie Christ Act II (2013)

The Ballad of Boogie Christ is the tenth studio album by American singer-songwriter Joseph Arthur, released on June 11, 2013, on Real World and Lonely Astronaut Records. A concept album, The Ballad of Boogie Christ follows "a fictionalized character loosely based on [Arthur’s] own journey," and was funded by a PledgeMusic campaign.

The album features a re-recording of the track, "I Miss the Zoo", which appeared on Arthur's previous album, Redemption City (2012).

== Background and recording ==
The Ballad of Boogie Christ's songs originated as poems, with Joseph Arthur noting, "It all came from words and poems like seeds that bloomed into songs which themselves fathered some of the richest music I've made in seventeen years of putting together records." According to Arthur, "Boogie Christ is unlike anything I've ever done before. It’s a big production with horns and soul singers; a psychedelic soul record about redemption and what happens after you find it and lose it."

== Writing and composition ==
The Ballad of Boogie Christ is a loose concept album, based on Arthur's life. Regarding the album's narrative, Arthur noted, "I don't know that there's a beginning, middle and end to the story, but there are definitely experiences, situations, and perspectives that point in those directions. I wanted to let the listener fill in some of the blanks without telling the whole story in a straight-ahead way." Arthur elaborated, "I've heard David Bowie talk about how Ziggy Stardust and some other records were the beginnings of screenplays that he just never finished. I could really see this becoming something deeper and bigger than just an album. Chuck Prophet reminded me that there's always the Great American Novel, and that really stuck in my head about Boogie Christ. That's what I've been wanting to achieve with this album. He encouraged me that it was okay to dream big."

== Release ==
=== PledgeMusic campaign ===
In order to release the album, Joseph Arthur started a PledgeMusic campaign. Receiving 1107 pledges, Arthur reached 117% of his total goal – surpassing his initial request. Regarding his campaign, Arthur stated: "It’s not without much thought that I’ve decided to go ahead and do a Pledge campaign. I’ve had it cued up with the folks over there several times but backed out each time, I think from some kind of knee-jerk pride that didn’t want to ask you for help. But I think with the music business being what it is nowadays, unless you break out big or become a license darling, there are precious few alternatives to fund one’s work. Some say it’s sad that it has come to this but I’m optimistic that new ways of doing things can lead to new forms of creativity and a smaller world community for artists to get to know their fans or for fans to become a more vital part in the process of artists creating their diamonds."

== Critical reception ==
Professional ratings
Aggregate scores
Source	Rating
Metacritic	74/100
Review scores
Source	Rating
Allmusic	4/5 stars
American Songwriter	4/5 stars
Blurt	4/5 stars
PopMatters	7/10 stars

Allmusic's Thom Jurek gave the album a positive review, writing: "[Arthur's] always tried so hard to capture the heat of the moment in the studio, that he can get sloppy, thus blunting impact. The Ballad of Boogie Christ changes that. [...] To say that The Ballad of Boogie Christ is inspired is an understatement. It was written, performed, cut, and mixed with great care, and as such delivers Arthur's creative vision with abundant emotional power." Megan Pacella, writing for American Songwriter, also gave the album a positive review, stating: "The Ballad of Boogie Christ" weaves beautiful narratives in and out of folksy numbers and rock songs, adding a layered palette of horn solos and soulful back-up singers. In short, there's a reason why Arthur calls this album one of the “richest” projects he's worked on during his 17-year career." PopMatters gave the album a mostly positive review, but stated: "The Ballad of Boogie Christ remains a very good Joseph Arthur record, but it lacks the immediate virtues of his greatest albums. It's a worthy addition to his discography, but likely not to go down in the upper tier of his best recordings."

== Track listing ==
1. "Currency of Love" – 3:14
2. "Saint of Impossible Causes" – 4:32
3. "The Ballad of Boogie Christ" – 4:13
4. "I Used to Know How to Walk on Water" – 4:46
5. "Wait for Your Lights" – 3:12
6. "I Miss the Zoo" – 4:52
7. "It's Ok to Be Young/Gone" 3:18
8. "Still Life Honey Rose" – 4:23
9. "Black Flowers" – 2:41
10. "King of Cleveland" – 4:33
11. "Famous Friends Along the Coast" – 5:40
12. "All the Old Heroes" – 7:13

== Personnel ==
- Joseph Arthur – lead vocals, backing vocals, guitar (2–12), bass guitar (2, 5, 6, 7, 10, 11 and 12), keyboards and piano (1, 2, 5, 6, 7, 10 and 12), percussion (2–11), drums (7, 10 and 11), sitar (2)
- Garth Hudson – keyboards and piano (4 and 9)
- Catherine Popper – bass guitar (3, 4, 8 and 9)
- Chris Seefried – guitar, piano, strings and backing vocals (1)
- Ben Harper – backing vocals (4), slide guitar (4 and 11)
- Jim Keltner – drums and percussion (12)
- Joan Wasser – violin and backing vocals (3 and 4)
- Paul Cantelon – violin and piano (12)
- Greg Wieczorek – drums and percussion (3, 4, 8, 9 and 12)
- David Immerglück – guitar (1)
- John Flaugher – bass guitar (1)
- Sam Cohen – guitar (8 and 9)
- Jessy Greene – violin (3, 9 and 11)
- Rami Jaffee – organ (3, 11 and 12)
- Kraig Jarret Johnson – guitar and backing vocals (5), additional bass guitar (11)
- James King – horns (1)
- Jenni Muldaur – backing vocals (3, 8 and 9)
- Juliette Lewis – backing vocals (2)
- John "Scrappy" Sneider – trumpets, flugelhorn and horn arrangements (3, 4 and 9)
- Sebastian Steinberg – bass guitar (1)
- Aaron Sterling – drums (1)
- Damara Stolfo – backing vocals (8)
- C.C. White – backing vocals (3, 9, 11 and 12)
