= Setting Sun =

Setting Sun may refer to:

- The Setting Sun, a 1947 Japanese novel by Osamu Dazai
- The Setting Sun (film), a 1992 film directed by Rou Tomono
- Setting Sun (band), an American rock band
- Setting Sun (horse) (1952–1976), a champion Tennessee Walking Horse
- "Setting Sun" (The Chemical Brothers song), a song on The Chemical Brothers' 1996 album Dig Your Own Hole
- "Setting Sun" (Howling Bells song), a song on the 2006 album Howling Bells
- "Setting Sun" (Jerry Cantrell song), a song from the 2018 Dark Nights: Metal Soundtrack
