= The Graduation Ceremony =

Studio album by Joseph Arthur
- Released: May 23, 2011
- Recorded: Village Recording; The Carriage House, Los Angeles; Flowers Studio
- Genre: indie folk, acoustic
- Label: Lonely Astronaut Records
- Producer: John Alagia and Joseph Arthur

Joseph Arthur chronology
Temporary People (2008)	The Graduation Ceremony (2011)	Redemption City (2012)

The Graduation Ceremony is the eighth studio album by American singer-songwriter Joseph Arthur, released on May 23, 2011 on Lonely Astronaut Records. Following two studio albums with backing band, The Lonely Astronauts, The Graduation Ceremony is Arthur's first solo album since Nuclear Daydream (2006), and was initially intended to be a joint release with session drummer Jim Keltner. Prior to the album's release, Arthur noted, "early signs are quite good that people might like it. One can only hope. You do your thing put it out and move on. Artists and sharks are the same." Regarding the album's stripped-back aesthetic, Arthur stated, "I wanted to make something simple."

Produced by John Alagia, the album features Liz Phair, Jim Keltner and Lonely Astronauts bassist Sybil Buck amongst its contributors.

== Background and recording ==
Upon writing the album's opening track, "Out on a Limb", on a friend's guitar, whilst staying in Los Angeles, Arthur subsequently recorded the track, alongside ten others at Sheldon Gomberg's studio, The Carriage House. Arthur noted, "I'm always looking for creative outlets when I'm in L.A., because L.A. scares me. There's a great energy in not being home. So I called Sheldon and I said I had some songs to record, and would he be up for it? He said 'sure', and I said, 'Well I'm already outside. Can I come in?' I went through all these tracks - some old, some brand new ones that I hadn't recorded - on mostly first or second takes, and that was going to be the record."

Eventually deciding that the tracks were "undercooked and underproduced," Arthur contacted session drummer Jim Keltner, who had recently worked with Arthur on the collaborative album, As I Call You Down, and had previously appeared on Arthur's second studio album, Come to Where I'm From, to record drum tracks to the stripped-back acoustic recordings. Arthur subsequently contacted producer John Alagia, who had previously produced Arthur's contribution to the Shrek 2 soundtrack, "You're So True", and the duo began working on the already recorded material, alongside other tracks.

== Track listing ==
1. "Out on a Limb"
2. "Horses"
3. "Almost Blue"
4. "Someone to Love"
5. "Watch Our Shadows Run"
6. "This is Still My World"
7. "Over the Sun"
8. "Face in the Crowd"
9. "Midwest"
10. "Gypsy Faded"
11. "Call"
12. "Love Never Asks You to Lie"

== Personnel ==
=== Musicians ===
- Joseph Arthur - lead vocals, guitar, bass guitar, keyboards, drums
- John Alagia - guitar, bass guitar
- Jim Keltner - drums
- Sibyl Buck - backing vocals
- Brian Cohen - backing vocals
- Madi Diaz - backing vocals
- Liz Phair - backing vocals

=== Recording personnel ===
- John Algia - producer, recording, mixing
- Joseph Arthur - producer
- Sheldon Gomberg - recording (The Carriage House)
- Ed Ackerson - recording (Flowers Studio)
- Scott Hull - mastering

=== Artwork ===
- Davies - artwork
