= Temporary People =

Studio album by Joseph Arthur and The Lonely Astronauts
- Released: September 30, 2008 (US); October 27, 2008 (Europe)
- Recorded: 2007–2008
- Genre: Alternative rock
- Length: 49:14
- Labels: Lonely Astronaut Records; Fargo Records
- Producers: Kenny Siegal, Joseph Arthur, The Lonely Astronauts

Joseph Arthur and The Lonely Astronauts chronology
Let's Just Be (2007)	Temporary People (2008)

Joseph Arthur chronology
Foreign Girls (EP) (2008)	Temporary People (2008)	The Graduation Ceremony (2011)

Professional ratings
Review scores
Source	Rating
Allmusic	link
ChartAttack	link
Crawdaddy!	positive link
ESD Music	link
The McGill Tribune	good link
Mojo	(January 2009 issue, p.104)
Q	3/5 stars
Times Online	link

Temporary People is the seventh studio album by American singer-songwriter Joseph Arthur, released on September 30, 2008, on Lonely Astronaut Records. Co-produced by both Arthur and Kenny Siegal – who had previously worked with Arthur on Nuclear Daydream (2006) – the album was recorded with backing band The Lonely Astronauts, and features guest musician Garth Hudson on organ and piano.

The album was preceded by the release of four solo EPs – Could We Survive, Crazy Rain, Vagabond Skies and Foreign Girls – with Arthur later stating that Temporary People's overall impact and reception was affected by this: "When I put out Temporary People I had just put out four EPs, so it was kind of hard to get anybody pay attention to it. You sort of have to give space in between releases or else people won’t pay attention."

== Background and recording ==
In a November 2008 interview with Joseph on NPR radio, Joseph described the album as being "about a journey, reaching toward the light through your spirit, trying to overcome your demons through your spirit." He said his new listeners should start with Temporary People, adding, "It's a true record, in that it works as a record, it works as a body of work [and] it tells a story: reaching into your soul to overcome your weaknesses and survive with hope...with a rock 'n' roll soundtrack."

== Release ==
Stereogum.com premiered the music video for the album's title track on August 26, 2008. The video, directed by Cerise Leang, features Joseph and the band partying at his Museum of Modern Arthur art gallery in Brooklyn's DUMBO district. The website also posted a free MP3 download of the track as well. Shortly thereafter, a music video was produced for second single "Faith," directed by Stephen Shellenberger, and shot on a trailer park in Ipperwash, Canada. "Faith" was released in the UK as a double A-side promo single, with "Look Into the Sky," on December 15, 2008.

Originally, as posted on Arthur's website in January 2008, his next studio album was to be a solo album titled All You Need Is Nothing with a release date of August 5.

== Track listing ==
No.	Title	Writer(s)	Length
1.	"Temporary People"	Arthur	5:06
2.	"Faith"	Arthur, Greg Wieczorek	4:42
3.	"Say Goodbye"	Arthur, Kraig Jarret Johnson	4:03
4.	"Dead Savior"	Arthur	3:37
5.	"Look into the Sky"	Arthur	4:09
6.	"Sunrise Dolls"	Arthur	3:58
7.	"A Dream Is Longer Than the Night"	Arthur, Jennifer Turner, Wieczorek	2:25
8.	"Heart's a Soldier"	Arthur, Johnson, Wieczorek	4:01
9.	"Turn You On"	Arthur	4:41
10.	"Winter Blades"	Arthur, Johnson	3:49
11.	"Drive"	Arthur	5:00
12.	"Good Friend"	Arthur	3:44

== Notes ==
- US CD: Lonely Astronaut Records #LA007, comes in a digipak.
- US vinyl LP: Lonely Astronaut Records #LA008, comes in a gatefold sleeve.
- European CD: Fargo Records #FR21159, comes in a Super Jewel Box.
- European vinyl LP: Fargo Records #FR21160, comes in a gatefold sleeve.

== Singles ==
- "Temporary People" (August 26, 2008) (video only)
- "Faith" (September 23, 2008) (U.S., radio promo single and video only)
- "Faith" (radio edit)/"Look Into the Sky" (December 15, 2008) (radio promo single only)

== Album credits ==
- The Lonely Astronauts are:
  - Joseph Arthur – vocals, guitar, keyboards, percussion
  - Kraig Jarret Johnson – guitar, keyboards, harmonica, backing vocals, BBQ
  - Jennifer Turner – guitar, piano, keyboards, backing vocals, bass on "A Dream Is Longer Than the Night"
  - Sibyl Buck – bass, backing vocals
  - Greg Wieczorek – drums, percussion, backing vocals
- Garth Hudson – organ, piano
- Brian Geltner – percussion, backing vocals
- Jena Kraus – backing vocals
- Cerise Leang – backing vocals
- Kenny Siegal – dobro, guitar, backing vocals
- Nina Violet – strings on "Say Goodbye" and "Heart's a Soldier"
- Produced by Kenny Siegal, Joseph Arthur, and The Lonely Astronauts.
- Recorded by Tom Schick and Kenny Siegal at Old Soul Studios, and Joseph Arthur at The Diamond Room.
- Mixed by Bryce Goggin at Trout Studios.
- Mastered by Fred Kevorkian at Kevorkian Mastering.
- Art direction by Lauren Pattenaude and Joseph Arthur.
- Cover photography by Jelle Wagenaar (shot at Universal Display and Design).
- Additional photography by Joseph Arthur, Kraig Jarret Johnson, Cerise Leang, and Lauren Pattenaude.
- Layout and design by Lauren Pattenaude, Kraig Jarret Johnson, Greg Wieczorek, and Bryan Kveton.
