= Cut and Blind =

EP by Joseph Arthur
- Released: August 1996
- Recorded: 1996
- Genre: Alternative rock, indie rock
- Length: 16:05
- Label: Sell My Soup Records
- Producer: Joseph Arthur

Joseph Arthur chronology
Cut and Blind (1996)	Big City Secrets (1997)

Cut and Blind is the debut EP by American singer-songwriter Joseph Arthur, released in August 1996 on Sell My Soup Records. The EP was entirely self-produced, with Arthur performing each instrument and creating the artwork in his home. The song "Pick Up the Phone" is an early version of "History", later re-recorded for his second studio album, Come to Where I'm From (2000). The other three songs would appear on his debut album Big City Secrets (1997), with "Mikel K" and "Porcupine" appearing as re-recorded versions.

== Reception ==
Cut and Blind subsequently lead to Arthur signing to Peter Gabriel's label, Real World Records. In 2011, Arthur noted, "I passed it out to a few people and it ended up in Peter Gabriel’s hands completely randomly."

== Track listing ==
All tracks are written by Joseph Arthur

No.	Title	Length
1.	"Daddy's on Prozac"	4:05
2.	"Porcupine"	4:50
3.	"Pick Up the Phone"	3:40
4.	"Mikel K"	3:30

== Personnel ==
- Joseph Arthur – vocals, guitars, pianoforte
