= Chemical (Joseph Arthur song) =

2000 single by Joseph Arthur

Single by Joseph Arthur

from the album Come to Where I'm From
- Released: June 26, 2000
- Recorded: Sound City, Sunset Sound
- Genre: Alternative rock
- Length: 4:11
- Label: Real World Records; Virgin Records
- Songwriter: Joseph Arthur
- Producers: Joseph Arthur, T-Bone Burnett

Joseph Arthur singles chronology
| "Chemical" (2000) | "In the Sun" (2001) |

"Chemical" is the first single from Joseph Arthur's second studio album Come to Where I'm From. The single was released in the UK and Australia on June 26, 2000 via Real World Records and Virgin Records. Joseph very rarely played "Chemical" live—the first known version was in New York City in March 1998. A music video was produced for the song, directed by Anton Corbijn (however, the video does not appear on the Directors Label DVD The Work of Director Anton Corbijn). The video features Joseph as two characters: the first as himself, playing his guitar and singing the song, and the other as a man clad in black with a fake moustache and temporary tattoos. Joseph's friend Valdet builds a sculpture behind Joseph through the video.

== Track listing ==
CD:

1. "Chemical" – 4:11
2. "Heavy Bullets" – 4:35
3. "Ask the Dust" – 6:52

7" vinyl:

1. "Chemical" – 4:11
2. "Ask the Dust" – 6:52
