= As I Call You Down =

Studio album by Fistful of Mercy
- Released: October 5, 2010
- Recorded: 2010
- Genre: Blues, folk rock, psychedelic
- Length: 39:28
- Label: HOT Records
- Producer: Fistful of Mercy

Joseph Arthur chronology
iTunes Live from Montreal (2009)	As I Call You Down (2010)	The Graduation Ceremony (2011)

Ben Harper chronology
White Lies for Dark Times (2009)	As I Call You Down (2010)	Give Till It's Gone (2011)

Dhani Harrison chronology
You Are Here (2008)	As I Call You Down (2010)	EP002 (2011)

As I Call You Down is the debut album by American rock supergroup Fistful of Mercy, released on October 5, 2010.

== Track listing ==
All tracks are written by Joseph Arthur, Ben Harper, and Dhani Harrison.

No.	Title	Length
1.	"In Vain or True"	3:58
2.	"I Don't Want to Waste Your Time"	4:02
3.	"As I Call You Down"	3:00
4.	"Father's Son"	4:16
5.	"Fistful of Mercy"	5:40
6.	"30 Bones"	4:10
7.	"Restore Me"	5:08
8.	"Things Go 'Round"	3:41
9.	"With Whom You Belong"	5:33

iTunes Bonus Tracks
No.	Title	Length
10.	"Fistful of Mercy" (Live @ KCRW)	5:48
11.	"In Vain or True" (Live @ KCRW)	4:09

== Personnel ==
- Dhani Harrison – lead, harmony, and backing vocals, acoustic guitar, electric guitar, bass guitar, keyboards
- Ben Harper – lead, harmony, and backing vocals, acoustic guitar, electric guitar, slide guitar
- Joseph Arthur – lead, harmony, and backing vocals, acoustic guitar, electric guitar, bass guitar, keyboards
- Jim Keltner – drums
- Jessy Greene – violin
