= Let's Just Be =

Studio album by Joseph Arthur
- Released: April 17, 2007 (US)
- Recorded: October–November 2006; Donner & Blitzen Studios, Arcadia, California
- Genre: Alternative rock
- Length: 78:43
- Labels: Lonely Astronaut Records; 14th Floor Records
- Producers: Joseph Arthur, The Lonely Astronauts

Joseph Arthur chronology
Let's Just Be (2007)	Temporary People (2008)

Joseph Arthur chronology
Nuclear Daydream (2006)	Let's Just Be (2007)	Could We Survive (EP) (2008)

Professional ratings
Review scores
Source	Rating
AllMusic	link (was originally given until September 2008)
EW.com	3.5/5 stars
L.A. Times	3.5/5 stars
Paste Magazine	3/5 stars
Pitchfork Media	(3.4/10) link
Spin	2.5/5 stars
Stylus Magazine	2.5/5 stars
Q	2/5 stars

Let's Just Be is the sixth studio album by Joseph Arthur, and his first with his backing band The Lonely Astronauts. The album was released on April 17, 2007, in the US, and on September 3, 2007, in the UK. According to Arthur: "the philosophy of the whole record was sort of a letting go, that's why I called it Let's Just Be, because it was like everything about that record [came from] a Zen-like approach. Just letting things be how they are."

Let's Just Be was released seven months after his previous album, Nuclear Daydream. The band recorded the album in a quick stint while touring in Southern California in 2006 at Mathias Schneeberger's studio. Arthur notes that: "the idea for us was to record all of these new songs straight to tape using only 16 tracks with no reverb, sort of a back to basics like how the Stones or Neil Young used to record. These albums are really a band effort, there was a lot of collaboration in the studio and quite a few songs on the album were co-writes."

There is a standard edition and a special edition (featuring different artwork) of the album available (in the US only, released on May 15, 2007).

The album version of "Diamond Ring" is featured as the B-side to the UK single of "Enough to Get Away," released August 27, 2007. The album version of "Take Me Home" is featured as the B-side to the single of "Honey and the Moon," released March 26, 2007.

== Track listing ==
No.	Title	Writer(s)	Length
1.	"Diamond Ring"	Arthur, Kraig Jarret Johnson	3:26
2.	"Good Life"	Arthur	4:24
3.	"Precious One"	Arthur	3:28
4.	"Spacemen"	Arthur	4:33
5.	"Take Me Home"	Arthur, Johnson	4:41
6.	"Chicago"	Arthur	5:01
7.	"Cockteeze"	Arthur, Johnson	1:46
8.	"Lonely Astronaut"	Arthur	20:32
9.	"Cocaine Feet"	Arthur	3:43
10.	"Let's Just Be"	Arthur, Johnson	2:31
11.	"Shake It Off"	Arthur	1:32
12.	"Lack a Vision"	Arthur	4:45
13.	"Gimmie Some Company"	Jennifer Turner	3:01
14.	"I Will Carry You"	Arthur, Johnson	3:55
15.	"Yer the Reason"	Arthur, Johnson	2:20
16.	"Star Song"	Arthur	8:57

== Notes ==
- Lonely Astronaut Records #002.

== Album credits ==
- The Lonely Astronauts are:
  - Joseph Arthur – lead vocals (1–12, 15, 16), guitar, electric sitar (16)
  - Kraig Jarret Johnson – guitar, backing and lead (14) vocals, keyboards
  - Jennifer Turner – guitar, backing and lead (13) vocals
  - Sibyl Buck – bass, backing vocals
  - Greg Wieczorek – drums, backing vocals
- Produced by Joseph Arthur with The Lonely Astronauts.
- Mixed by Joseph Arthur.
- Recorded and engineered by Mathias Schneeberger at Donner & Blitzen Studios, Arcadia, California.
- All songs mastered by Fred Kevorkian at Kevorkian Mastering, Inc.
- Original artwork (ink and charcoal on arches watercolor paper) by Davies.
- Photos by Cerise Leang, Joseph Arthur and Lauren Pattenaude.
- Copy help by Karen Karibian.
- Art direction and design by Judith Salavetz and Spencer Drate.

== Demos ==
In December 2006, 14 new songs (recorded with the Lonely Astronauts) were placed on Joseph's website, available for free download or with a donation. The 14 tracks comprised the original track listing for Let's Just Be in this order:

1. "Baby's Got a New Friend" – 5:59
2. "Cockteezzze" – 1:44
3. "Famous Friends Along the Coast" – 5:28
4. "Love" – 6:34
5. "Skull Kiss" – 3:53
6. "Cocaine Feet" – 4:14
7. "Bust Me" – 3:05
8. "Breadhead" – 4:29
9. "Precious One" – 4:27
10. "Take Me Home" – 4:41
11. "Here Come the Spacemen" – 3:49
12. "Let's Just Be" – 2:36
13. "Diamond Ring" – 3:42
14. "The Good Life" – 4:28
- The song "Breadhead" was conceived at the House of Blues side stage in San Diego, California during Arthur's tour for Nuclear Daydream. Near the end of the concert, he began strumming a song, and told the band to play along. A few minutes later, "Breadhead" had been written and played for the first time, and Arthur said it would appear on the next album.
