= The Invisible Parade & We Almost Made It =

The Invisible Parade (CD) & We Almost Made It (book)
- Cover art for The Invisible Parade CD

Studio album by Joseph Arthur
- Released: May 18, 2006
- Recorded: 2005–2006, Berlin and Los Angeles
- Genre: Alternative rock
- Length: 77:44
- Labels: Self-released; 14th Floor Records
- Producer: Joseph Arthur

Joseph Arthur chronology
And the Thieves Are Gone (2004)	The Invisible Parade (CD) & We Almost Made It (book) (2006)	Nuclear Daydream (2006)

We Almost Made It is the title of Joseph Arthur's first artbook, released in 2006. It comes with a CD titled The Invisible Parade, a 21-track disc of mostly instrumental songs. Joseph described the set as "an artbook with a soundtrack." Only 5000 copies of the book/disc set were released. The hardcover book contains 110 pages of Joseph's original artwork, marking the first time a collection of his artwork has been made available for publication. In his solo music, Arthur is known to integrate distortion and loop pedals. The unravelling quality of his mixed media paintings rhymes with this technique. The songs "Chapter 4," "Chapter 15," and "Chapter 19" are the only songs on the disc that have lyrics. "Chapter 15" contains lyrics taken from Joseph's poem "On a boat from Ireland to England," and "Chapter 19" contains lyrics from the poem "I saw a nail driven into his hand" (both poems posted on Joseph's website in October 2005). "Chapter 1" and "Chapter 8" also appeared in the documentary film Deliver Us from Evil in 2006 (with "Chapter 1" listed as "Cathedral," and "Chapter 8" listed as "Pyramids"). The book was only available through his website and at his live shows.

== CD track listing ==
All tracks are written by Joseph Arthur.

No.	Title	Length
1.	"Chapter 1"	4:18
2.	"Chapter 2"	4:13
3.	"Chapter 3"	3:41
4.	"Chapter 4"	3:48
5.	"Chapter 5"	1:21
6.	"Chapter 6"	4:49
7.	"Chapter 7"	3:33
8.	"Chapter 8"	2:42
9.	"Chapter 9"	1:08
10.	"Chapter 10"	1:06
11.	"Chapter 11"	3:14
12.	"Chapter 12"	3:08
13.	"Chapter 13"	1:18
14.	"Chapter 14"	4:58
15.	"Chapter 15"	3:28
16.	"Chapter 16"	3:43
17.	"Chapter 17"	3:26
18.	"Chapter 18"	3:28
19.	"Chapter 19"	6:51
20.	"Chapter 20"	3:50
21.	"Chapter 21"	9:41

== Credits ==
- All songs written, produced, performed, mixed and arranged by Joseph Arthur.
- Additional mixing and production by Matt Boynton, Gary Go and Andreas Wickmann.
- Caroline Glass played: bass clarinet ("Chapter 1," "Chapter 3," "Chapter 10," "Chapter 11," "Chapter 18"), duduk ("Chapter 4"), oboe ("Chapter 10," "Chapter 11," "Chapter 21"), and English horn ("Chapter 16," "Chapter 21").
- Additional drums by Greg Wieczorek (G.Wiz).
