= Furslide =

American alternative rock band

- L-R: Adam MacDougall, Jennifer Turner, and Jason Lader

Background information
- Origin: New York, NY
- Genres: Alternative rock Indie rock
- Years active: 1997–1999
- Labels: Meanwhile... (Virgin Records)
- Past members: Jennifer Turner; Jason Lader; Adam MacDougall

Furslide was an alternative rock band from New York, NY. They released one full-length album, called Adventure, on Meanwhile..., a sublabel of Virgin Records created by Nellee Hooper, on October 6, 1998.

== History ==
The band's vocalist, Jennifer Turner, was playing as a guitarist on the Tigerlily tour with Natalie Merchant, when she formed Furslide together with Jason Lader and Adam MacDougall in early 1997. Furslide was the first band on Nellee Hooper's new label "Meanwhile..." when they were signed in 1998. They released their only album, Adventure, in 1998. It was produced by Nellee Hooper. Regarding the album's lyrics, vocalist Jennifer Turner said in 1998, "the whole idea about music for me is all about expressing yourself and expressing the honesty of the moment, whatever that is. It wasn’t that I had a specific goal in mind for the album; I'm into the Beat Generation thing of writing down streams of consciousness and cutting out words and throwing five in the middle and those five words have significance for some reason."

The Washington Post gave the album a mixed review, writing that singer/guitarist Jennifer Turner "has a strong, expressive rock soprano, and Hooper wraps her songs in a dizzying psychedelic-synth-pop swirl. The problem is the songs, which have neither memorable melodies nor coherent lyrics." The Austin Chronicle called it "an excellent introduction to pop's latest dynamic frontwoman: Jennifer Turner, a thoughtful songwriter who's perhaps the best female guitar hero since Jen Trynin." Spin wrote that it deserves to be a "pop hit."

Subsequently, Furslide played a couple of shows in the US, the UK and across Europe and opened for Lenny Kravitz on October 8, 1998, in Detroit. They were the support act for Kula Shaker, Alanis Morissette and Ben Folds). In 1999, they band dissolved, supposedly because of disappointing record sales.

=== Legacy ===
The music of Furslide was diverse and multifaceted. Turner named Joni Mitchell, Chrissie Hynde and Natalie Merchant as influences. Their track "Over My Head" was used on the Buffy the Vampire Slayer soundtrack album.

== Members ==
The band consisted of the following members:

- Jennifer Turner, guitars and vocals
- Jason Lader, bass guitar
- Adam MacDougall, drums

== Discography ==
- Adventure (1998)
