= Redemption City =

Studio album by Joseph Arthur
- Released: January 18, 2012
- Recorded: 2009–2011
- Genres: Alternative rock, folk rock
- Label: Self-released
- Producer: Joseph Arthur

Joseph Arthur chronology
The Graduation Ceremony (2011)	Redemption City (2012)	The Ballad of Boogie Christ (2013)

Redemption City is the ninth studio album by American singer-songwriter Joseph Arthur, self-released as a digital download on January 18, 2012. A double album, fans were given the option to download the release for free, or make a donation. A limited vinyl release is available to purchase from Arthur's official site. Regarding the album's unconventional and immediate release following its completion, Arthur stated, "Please don’t take the method, or the freedom, of this release to be any judgment on its value. [...] It's great to take advantage of what the internet is actually good at - immediacy. This is the first time I've released something while still inhabiting its space."

== Background and recording ==
Arthur began working on Redemption City in 2009, often abandoning the project, then returning to it; building a recording studio in Brooklyn for the sole purpose of recording the album, and performing each instrument on the album himself.

== Title ==
Upon the album's release, Arthur included a note online discussing the album's title, stating, "Around the time I was putting out Redemption's Son (2002), I met Peter Beard in Montauk. [...] One night I told Peter the name of my record that was about to come out, "Redemption’s Son," I said. "Too religious," he said. He was probably right but that’s what it was called, though it wasn’t out yet. The next day he said, “I thought of a better title for you.” I asked, “What?” He paused for drama and then said, Redemption City. 9/11 had just happened, it was a crazy title and I instantly liked it better than Redemption’s Son, but it was too late, that record was already on its way to stores. But I held onto that title. [...] A few years ago I set about making it. The record inspired by the title. What would a city of redemption sound like? What kind of characters would inhabit it?"

== Track listing ==
=== Part I ===
1. "Travel as Equals"
2. "Wasted Days"
3. "Mother of Exiles"
4. "Yer Only Job"
5. "I Miss the Zoo"
6. "There With Me"
7. "No Surrender Comes for Free"
8. "Night Clothes"
9. "Redemption City"
10. "Barriers"
11. "You're Not the Only One"
12. "So Far from Free"

=== Part II ===
1. "Surrender to the Storm"
2. "Fractures"
3. "Free Freedom"
4. "Touched"
5. "Follow"
6. "Kandinsky"
7. "Humanity Fade"
8. "Sleepless"
9. "It Takes a Lot of Time to Live in the Moment"
10. "Visit Us"
11. "I Am the Mississippi
12. "Travel as Equals" (reprise)

== Personnel ==
- Joseph Arthur - all instruments, producer, mixing
- Merritt Jacob - mixing
- Fred Kevorkian - mastering
- Carla Podgurecki - cover photograph
