= Could We Survive =

EP by Joseph Arthur
- Released: March 18, 2008
- Recorded: 2007–2008
- Genre: Alternative rock
- Length: 20:56
- Label: Lonely Astronaut Records
- Producers: Joseph Arthur, Mathias Schneeberger, Matt Boynton, Jennifer Turner

Joseph Arthur chronology
Let's Just Be (2007)	Could We Survive (2008)	Crazy Rain (EP) (2008)

Professional ratings
Review scores
Source	Rating
Allmusic	(not rated)
Comfort Comes	(8/10)
Pitchfork Media	(5.4/10)
PopMatters	(4/10)

Could We Survive is an EP from singer-songwriter/multi-instrumentalist Joseph Arthur. The EP was released in the US on March 18, 2008. Could We Survive is the first in a series of four EPs released in anticipation for the release of Joseph's seventh studio album Temporary People on September 30. From Billboard.com:

"When I make records, I tend to err on the side of them being too long," Arthur tells Billboard.com. "EPs keep me in a confined space. They're like poems. Plus, the EP is like the stepchild of a record -- people root for them. It's time to play with the form and the way things are done." Could We Survive, which begins with the anti-war track "Rages of Babylon," has a mix of "bigger production songs and some more lo-fi ones. I like putting those kinds of things together. On a sonic level, it's much more dynamic."

The title track "Could We Survive" appeared in the House M.D. episode "Lucky Thirteen", which first aired on October 21, 2008. "Walk Away" also appeared in the Hung episode "Do It, Monkey!" and in the Lie to Me episode "Undercover".

== Track listing ==
No.	Title	Writer(s)	Length
1.	"Rages of Babylon"	Arthur, Turner	3:40
2.	"Morning Cup"	Arthur, Turner	5:12
3.	"Shadows of Lies"	Arthur	4:01
4.	"Could We Survive"	Arthur	2:14
5.	"Walk Away"	Arthur	3:16
6.	"King of the Pavement"	Arthur	2:35

== Notes ==
- Recorded and produced by Joseph Arthur, Mathias Schneeberger, Matt Boynton, and Jennifer Turner.
- Musicians: Joseph Arthur, Mathias Schneeberger, Jennifer Turner, and Hoss.
- Photography: Front cover by Joseph Arthur. Inside and back cover by Cerise Leang.
- Lonely Astronaut Records #LA003.
