= Big City Secrets =

Studio album by Joseph Arthur
- Released: March 11, 1997
- Studio: Real World, England
- Genre: Alternative rock
- Length: 55:47
- Label: Real World Records
- Producer: Markus Dravs

Joseph Arthur chronology
Cut and Blind (1996)	Big City Secrets (1997)	Vacancy (EP) (1999)

Professional ratings
Review scores
Source	Rating
AllMusic	3.5/5 stars

Big City Secrets is the first studio album by American singer-songwriter Joseph Arthur, released by Real World Records on March 11, 1997.

== Track listing ==
All tracks are written by Joseph Arthur.

No.	Title	Length
1.	"Big City Secret"	4:37
2.	"Mercedes"	6:18
3.	"Mikel K"	3:54
4.	"Good About Me"	4:58
5.	"Daddy's on Prozac"	4:05
6.	"Marina"	4:03
7.	"Birthday Card"	5:36
8.	"Crying Like a Man"	6:16
9.	"Porcupine"	4:42
10.	"Dessert"	1:05
11.	"Haunted Eyes"	4:44
12.	"Bottle of You"	5:29

== Personnel ==
=== Musicians ===
- Joseph Arthur – guitar (1–5, 7–9, 11, 12), vocals, harmonica (2), highly-strung bass (5), paintings, drawings
- Roger Beaujolais – vibes (1), Venetian xylophone (2)
- Martyn Barker – treated tubular kit (1), drums (2, 3, 5, 6, 10, 11), caxixi (4), bondage snare (8), live drums (9), scaffolphoneum (9), berimbau (11), cow gong (11), percussion (12)
- Simon Edwards – bass (1–5, 10, 11), piano (4), bass performance & arrangement (6), coal bass (7), additional guitar (7), string fossil bass (8), maze bass (9), sas (9), berimbau (11), mellotron (11), Persian fretless (11), filter bass (12), harmonic missiles (12)
- Markus Dravs – keyboard (1), desert storm & gravel percussion (1), corn horn (2), drum programming (4, 7, 9), lesley accordion (7), low drum & sheet percussion (8), production, mixing
- Brian Eno – backing vocals (2)
- Peter Gabriel – backing vocals (2)
- Nigel Eaton – hurdy gurdy (3)
- Ashley Slater – trombone (6, 7)
- Ron Aslan – drum loop (7)
- Nick Plytas – mellotron (7)

=== Technical personnel ===
- Ben Findlay – engineering, editing, mixing
- Ruadhri Cushnan – additional engineering
- Ray Martin – additional engineering
- Goetz Botzenhardt – additional engineering
- Ibi Tjani – additional engineering
- Jacquie Turner – additional engineering
- Nick Kirkland – additional engineering
- Justin Griffith – assistant engineering
- Lee Phillips – assistant engineering
- Lee Fitzgerald – assistant engineering
- Mark Aubury – assistant engineering
- Crispin Murray – additional editing
- Paul Morris – additional editing
- Tristan Manco – graphic design
- Derek Edwards – 2012 Real World Gold reissue repackaged album design
- Michele Turriani – front cover and right hand inside panel background photography
- Anna Gabriel – CD face and inside left hand panel background photography
