= Sibyl Buck =

American model and musician (born 1972)

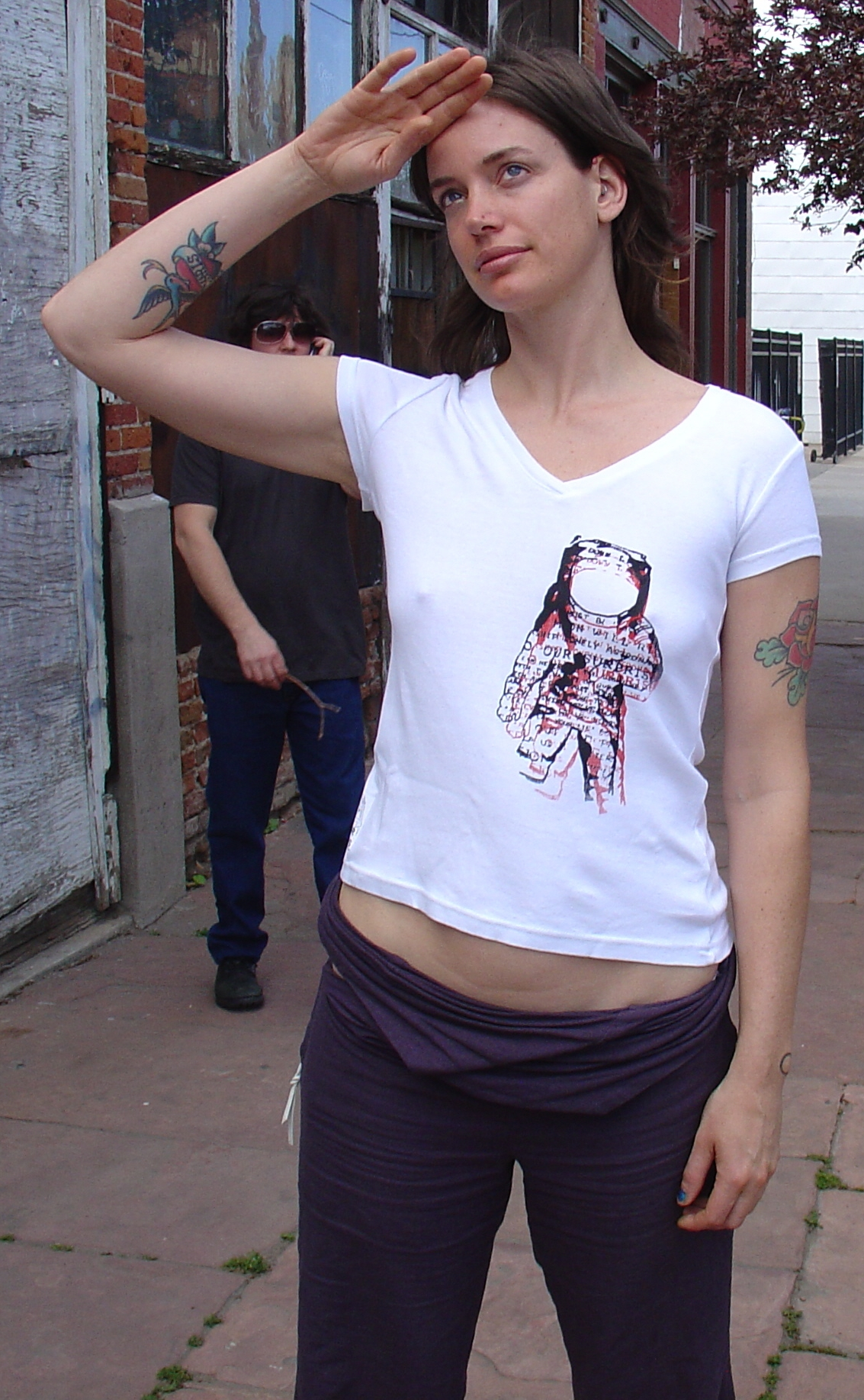
- Buck in 2007
- Born: May 27, 1972 (age 54); Versailles, France
- Citizenship: American
- Occupations: Model; musician
- Years active: 1992–present
- Partner: Chris Traynor
- Children: 1
- Modeling information
- Height: 1.79 m (5 ft 10 1/2 in)
- Hair color: Brown
- Eye color: Brown
- Agency: Marylin Models (New York); Oui Management (Paris); Linden Staub (London); Next Models (Los Angeles)
- Musical career
- Genre: Rock
- Instruments: Bass guitar, vocals
- Years active: 1998–present
- Formerly of: Champions of Sound, The Lonely Astronauts
- Website: sibylbuck.com

Sibyl Buck (born May 27, 1972) is an American rock musician and fashion model.

== Biography ==
=== Early life and modeling ===
Buck was born May 27, 1972, in Versailles, France. Her family moved to Virginia in the United States soon after her birth, where she grew up. She attended the Cambridge Rindge and Latin School where she cultivated a punk rock style donning many piercings, wearing flannels, ripped jeans, and Doc Martens. Upon modeling, a local photographer convinced her to be more natural. It wasn't until she moved to Paris that she embraced her rock-style by dying her hair bright red using Manic Panic's Pillar Box Red. Initially, she lost jobs such as a campaign for Nina Ricci but kept the red hair despite losing a job that would have paid $20,000. The gamble took off as she became a favorite model for Jean Paul Gaultier. Additionally, she worked for clients such Perry Ellis, Yves Saint-Laurent, Chanel, Jean-Paul Gaultier, Alexander McQueen, and many other fashion houses.

=== Television and film ===
In 1995, Buck became a television presenter for MTV's The Pulse. She also acted, playing the personal assistant of Zorg in the 1997 film The Fifth Element.

=== Music career ===
Buck took a break from the modeling industry in 1998 when she became a mother and began playing rock music in bands. She played bass guitar and sang in Champions of Sound alongside Chris Traynor of Orange 9mm/Helmet and Sergio Vega of Quicksand. In 2007, she recorded and performed with Joseph Arthur as a member of his backing band The Lonely Astronauts, appearing on his albums Let's Just Be, Temporary People, and The Graduation Ceremony. She also played bass for Bush in 2012, filling in for Corey Britz for a few shows. She is currently performing with the band High Desert Fires, and appears on the debut album Light Is the Revelation.

=== Return to modeling ===
Buck returned to modeling in 2022 when The Row flew her from Topanga to walk in their S/S23 show. She was also booked on that trip for a TV commercial for JPGautier. She returned to the catwalk for S/S23 for The Row, Vivienne Westwood, Thom Browne, and Miu Miu. She has since walked for Germanier, Uma Wang, and Vivienne Westwood.

=== Personal life ===
Buck has a daughter named Puma Rose, who is also a model. In 2008, Buck moved to Topanga Canyon and became a full-time yoga instructor.
