= Crazy Rain =

EP by Joseph Arthur
- Released: April 15, 2008
- Recorded: 2008
- Genre: Alternative rock
- Length: 29:49
- Label: Lonely Astronaut Records
- Producer: Joseph Arthur, Mathias Schneeberger, Jennifer Turner

Joseph Arthur chronology
Could We Survive (EP) (2008)	Crazy Rain (2008)	Vagabond Skies (EP) (2008)

Professional ratings
Review scores
Source	Rating
Allmusic	3.5/5 stars
Pitchfork Media	(6.3/10)
PopMatters	(2/10)

Crazy Rain is an EP from singer-songwriter/multi-instrumentalist Joseph Arthur. The 8-song EP was released in the US on April 15, 2008. Crazy Rain is the second in a series of four EPs released in anticipation for the release of Joseph's seventh studio album Temporary People on September 30. From Billboard.com:

For Crazy Rain, Arthur is "working with a lot of drum machines" but doesn't classify the material as techno per se. "It's just more on the edgier, drum machine-side of what I do," he says. "..."I'm using old drum machines and doing home recording-style stuff. It's the most fun to do what you haven't done in awhile [sic]."

The lyrics to "Killer's Knife" first appeared in Joseph's poem "111704. Minneapolis." in 2004. The song was then known under the name "Heartbeart" and the lyrics had a few different lines. Greg Dulli provides backing vocals on "Nothin' 2 Hide."

== Track listing ==
No.	Title	Writer(s)	Length
1.	"Killer's Knife"	Arthur	4:13
2.	"Nothin' 2 Hide"	Arthur	3:44
3.	"I Wanna Get You Alone"	Arthur, Turner	4:06
4.	"Radio Euphoria"	Arthur	3:26
5.	"Dream of the Eternal Life"	Arthur	5:24
6.	"I Come Down"	Arthur, Dave Rosser	2:23
7.	"Nobody Make It Home"	Arthur, Turner	3:00
8.	"Hunter"	Arthur	3:33

== Notes ==
- Recorded and produced by Joseph Arthur, Mathias Schneeberger, and Jennifer Turner.
- Musicians: Joseph Arthur, Mathias Schneeberger, Jennifer Turner, and Dave Rosser.
- Guest vocals on "Killer's Knife" by James Hall.
- Guest vocals on "Nothin' 2 Hide" by Greg Dulli.
- Photography by Danny Clinch.
- Lonely Astronaut Records #LA004.
