= Foreign Girls =

EP by Joseph Arthur
- Released: July 8, 2008
- Recorded: 2008
- Genre: Alternative rock
- Length: 18:05
- Label: Lonely Astronaut Records
- Producer: Joseph Arthur

Joseph Arthur chronology
| Vagabond Skies (EP) (2008) | Foreign Girls (2008) | Temporary People (2008) |

Foreign Girls is an EP from singer-songwriter Joseph Arthur, released July 8, 2008, and is the last of a series of EPs released in anticipation for Arthur's seventh studio album, Temporary People.

Arthur referred to the EP in an Orlando Weekly interview:

"I feel like I've been trying to get to this point for years now. It just makes sense to get things out closer to the impulse. Up until the EP goes to mastering, I'm still working on them. [The songs] can be a week old by the time they go to mastering, but some of them are a year old. I haven't made the fourth yet, I made a lot of spoken-word tracks with [frequent Gutter Twins guitarist] Dave Rosser that I'd like to do something with."

The song "Foreign Girls" first appeared as a poem and a recording on Joseph's MySpace page on April 13, 2008.

Professional ratings
Review scores
| Source | Rating |
|---|---|
| Allmusic | (not rated) link |
| Pitchfork Media | link |
| PopMatters | link |

== Track listing ==
All tracks are written by Joseph Arthur.

| No. | Title | Length |
|---|---|---|
| 1. | "Foreign Girls" | 2:48 |
| 2. | "Candy and Cars" | 2:17 |
| 3. | "Lovely Cost" | 2:57 |
| 4. | "Stay" | 2:55 |
| 5. | "The Killer" | 3:44 |
| 6. | "New Satisfaction" | 3:24 |

== Notes ==
- Produced and engineered by Joseph Arthur.
- Joseph Arthur: vocals, guitars, bass, keyboards, drums, percussion, and programming.
- Background vocals on "Foreign Girls" and "Candy and Cars" by Cerise Leang.
- Art direction and packaging design by Joseph Arthur and Lauren Pattenaude.
- Front cover photo by Edith Muniz.
- Back cover photo by Cerise Leang.
- Lonely Astronaut Records #LA006.
