= Vacancy (EP) =

EP by Joseph Arthur
- Released: May 11, 1999
- Recorded: Sound City, Sunset Sound
- Genre: Alternative rock, indie rock
- Length: 32:41
- Label: Undercover; Real World Records
- Producer: T-Bone Burnett, Rick Will, Joseph Arthur

Joseph Arthur chronology
| Big City Secrets (1997) | Vacancy (EP) (1999) | Come to Where I'm From (2000) |

Professional ratings
Review scores
| Source | Rating |
|---|---|
| Allmusic | link |

Vacancy is an EP by Joseph Arthur released on May 11, 1999. Released by the independent label Undercover out of Portland, Oregon, Vacancy is a hand packaged, limited edition that was assembled one at a time by two people at Undercover. Each one was pressed and die-cut, then assembled and folded by hand. Vacancy was limited to 10,000 copies worldwide—5,000 to the US and 5,000 to Europe, the UK and France. The EP's sleeve design was nominated in 1999 for a Grammy Award for Best Recording Package. Joan Osborne plays acoustic guitar on "Crying on Sunday."

The song "Bed of Nails" appears in the film "The Bone Collector" starring Denzel Washington and Angelina Jolie.

== Track listing ==
All tracks are written by Joseph Arthur.

| No. | Title | Length |
|---|---|---|
| 1. | "Hang Around Here" | 3:30 |
| 2. | "Bed of Nails" | 3:44 |
| 3. | "Prison" | 4:51 |
| 4. | "Making Mistakes" | 5:31 |
| 5. | "Vacancy" | 3:10 |
| 6. | "Crying on Sunday" | 4:40 |
| 7. | "Toxic Angel" (The song "Toxic Angel" ends at 4:30. After 40 seconds of silence [4:30 - 5:10], begins an untitled hidden song.) | 7:15 |

== Personnel ==
- All songs by Joseph Arthur.

Musicians:

- Joseph Arthur:
  - vocals on all tracks.
  - acoustic guitar - track 1, 2, 4, 5, 7.
  - electric guitar - track 1, 2, 3, 6.
  - backwards electric guitar - track 7.
  - bass - track 1, 2, 3, 4, 6.
  - keyboards - track 2.
  - piano - track 2.
  - harmonica - track 4, 7.
  - loops - track 4.
  - background vocals - track 6.
- Carla Azar: drums - track 1, 2, 3, 4, 6; bells - track 1; piano - track 6; bass drum - track 7; sleigh bells - track 7.
- T-Bone Burnett: bass - track 7.
- "Eugene": piano - track 4.
- Eric Gerber: background vocals - track 6.
- Nadia Lanman: cello - track 1.
- Joan Osborne: acoustic guitar - track 6.
- Rick Will: electric guitar - track 4; symphonic noise treatment - track 7.
- Produced by T-Bone Burnett, Rick Will and Joseph Arthur.
- Engineered by Rick Will.
- Mixed by Rick Will with T-Bone Burnett and Joseph Arthur.
- Additional engineering on track 1 by Ben Findlay.
- Assistant engineering by Nick Raskulinecz, Kevin Dean and Marek.
- Art direction and design by Zachary James Larner with Joseph Arthur at Bombshelter NYC.
- Original artwork by Joseph Arthur.
- Recorded at Sound City, Sunset Sound.
