= Junkyard Hearts =

- Cover art for reissued 2-CD set of Volumes I-IV

EP by Joseph Arthur
- Released: February 15, 2002 (EP I); February 28, 2002 (EP II); March 15, 2002 (EP III); March 28, 2002 (EP IV)
- Genre: Alternative rock
- Length: 21:21 (EP I); 25:38 (EP II); 18:39 (EP III); 23:39 (EP IV)
- Labels: Self-released; Real World Records
- Producers: Joseph Arthur, Ben Findlay

Joseph Arthur chronology
Come to Where I'm From (2000)	Junkyard Hearts (2002)	Redemption's Son (2002)

Junkyard Hearts is a set of 4 EPs released independently by Joseph Arthur in 2002 to coincide with his first headline tour in the UK. The EPs were released on special edition CD and collectors' edition 12" vinyl (with each 12" sleeve illustrated by Joseph Arthur himself). The EPs were only made available on the tour and are thus now hard to find. The set preceded his third studio album Redemption's Son.

The songs "Dear Lord," "The Termite Song," "Favorite Girl," and "Voices Will Fight" (later renamed "In the Night") appear on the album Redemption's Son. The version of "Dear Lord" on EP II features a longer outro than the version of the song found on Redemption's Son.

Real World Records reissued the four EPs onto a double CD set in July 2012, as a part of their Real World Gold series.

== Track listing ==
All tracks are written by Joseph Arthur.

EP I
No.	Title	Length
1.	"The Coldest Sea"	6:27
2.	"This Heart Will Swallow Us"	5:08
3.	"Jumping In with You"	2:31
4.	"Take Me Back Home"	3:10
5.	"Hold On Dear"	4:05

EP II
No.	Title	Length
1.	"Marmalade Eyes"	4:48
2.	"Queen of Brooklyn"	3:02
3.	"Glue Sniffer"	4:42
4.	"Dear Lord"	4:38
5.	"Bill Wilson"	6:03
6.	"Tiny Echoes"	2:25

EP III
No.	Title	Length
1.	"Space Needle"	5:38
2.	"Be My Friend"	3:36
3.	"The Termite Song"	9:25

EP IV
No.	Title	Length
1.	"Favorite Girl"	6:12
2.	"Crackerjack Box"	3:29
3.	"Voices Will Fight"	2:22
4.	"Still the Same"	5:24
5.	"In the Middle of the Night"	6:02

== Personnel ==
- Artwork by Joseph Arthur.
- Package design by Zachary James Larner.
- Custom printing by 500K.

=== EP I Credits ===
- Joseph Arthur - all instruments on all tracks.
- Produced by Joseph Arthur, except "The Coldest Sea" and "This Heart Will Swallow Us" produced by Ben Findlay and Joseph Arthur.
- Compiled and edited by Tchad Blake.
- Engineered by Ben Findlay - tracks 1 and 2; Joseph Arthur - tracks 3 and 5; Dave Boucher - track 4.
- Mixed by Ben Findlay - track 1; Tom Schick - tracks 2 and 3; Dave Boucher - track 4; Tchad Blake - track 5.
- Mastered by Julian Lowe at Metropolis Mastering

=== EP II Credits ===
- Joseph Arthur - all instruments on all tracks, except:
  - Pat Sansone - bass and organ on "Dear Lord"
  - Greg Wieczorek - drums on "Dear Lord"
- Produced by Joseph Arthur, except "Bill Wilson" and "Tiny Echoes" produced by Ben Findlay and Joseph Arthur.
- Compiled and edited by Tchad Blake.
- Engineered by Joseph Arthur - tracks 1 and 2; Dave Boucher - track 3; Roger Moutenot - track 4; Ben Findlay - tracks 5 and 6.
- Mixed by Ben Findlay - track 1, 5 and 6; Tom Schick - track 2; Dave Boucher - track 3; Tchad Blake - track 4.
- Mastered by Julian Lowe at Metropolis Mastering

=== EP III Credits ===
- Joseph Arthur - all instruments on all tracks, except:
  - Ben Findlay - bass on "Space Needle"
- Produced by Joseph Arthur, except "Space Needle" and "The Termite Song" produced by Ben Findlay and Joseph Arthur.
- Compiled and edited by Tchad Blake.
- Engineered by Ben Findlay - tracks 1 and 3; Joseph Arthur - track 2.
- Mixed by Ben Findlay - track 1; Tom Schick - track 2; Tchad Blake - track 3.
- Mastered by Julian Lowe at Metropolis Mastering

=== EP IV Credits ===
- Joseph Arthur - all instruments on all tracks, except:
  - Ben Findlay - background vocals on "Favorite Girl"
  - Nadia Lanman - strings on "Favorite Girl"
  - Dave Power - drums on "Favorite Girl"
  - Pat Sansone - bass, electric piano and background vocals on "Voices Will Fight"
  - Greg "G. Wiz" Wieczorek - drums and background vocals on "Voices Will Fight"
- Produced by Joseph Arthur, except tracks "Favorite Girl" and "Crackerjack Box" produced by Ben Findlay and Joseph Arthur.
- Compiled and edited by Tchad Blake.
- Engineered by Ben Findlay - tracks 1 and 2; Roger Moutenot - track 3; Joseph Arthur - tracks 4 and 5.
- Mixed by Ben Findlay - tracks 1, 2 and 5; Tchad Blake - track 3; Tom Schick - track 4.
- Mastered by Julian Lowe at Metropolis Mastering
