= In the Sun (Joseph Arthur song) =

Single by Joseph Arthur

from the album Come to Where I'm From
- Released: 2000
- Recorded: Sound City, Sunset Sound, Los Angeles
- Genre: Alternative rock
- Length: 4:08 (radio edit); 5:36 (album version)
- Label: Real World; Virgin
- Songwriter: Joseph Arthur Joseph Lyburn
- Producers: Joseph Arthur, Tchad Blake

Joseph Arthur singles chronology
"Chemical" (2000)	"In the Sun" (2000)	"All of Our Hands" (2005)

"In the Sun" is the second single from Joseph Arthur's second studio album Come to Where I'm From, though the song had been performed during his live shows as early as 1996.

== Release ==
The single was released in the UK and Europe on April 23, 2001, via Real World Records and Virgin Records.

A music video was produced for the song, directed by Anton Corbijn. The video is featured on the Directors Label series DVD The Work of Director Anton Corbijn.

On February 14, 2008, Joseph Arthur and his band The Lonely Astronauts performed "In the Sun" live on the Late Show with David Letterman.

== Track listing ==
CD

1. "In the Sun" (Edit) – 4:08
2. "The Other Side" – 3:15
3. "Cocaine Blind" – 3:19

7" vinyl (US white label promo)

1. "In the Sun" (Edit) – 4:08
2. "Speed of Light" – 4:30

US promo CD

1. "In the Sun" (Edit) – 4:08
2. "In the Sun" (Album Version) – 5:37
3. "In the Sun" (Call-Out Hook #1) – 0:10
4. "In the Sun" (Call-Out Hook #2) – 0:10
- Tracks 5–23: Interview with Joseph Arthur, March 6, 2000 (interviewed by Bart Lipton in Los Angeles)

== Use in films ==
The song appears in the TV series' Scrubs (episode "My New God") and Grey's Anatomy (episode "It's the End of the World)", in the 2004 comedy film Saved! and in the alternate ending to the 2002 action film The Bourne Identity.

== Cover versions ==
=== Michael Stipe ===
In the Sun

EP by Michael Stipe and Special Guests
- Released: February 6, 2006
- Recorded: 2005, Stratosphere Sound Studio, New York City, New York, United States
- Genre: Alternative rock
- Length: 47:16
- Language: English
- Label: Warner Bros.
- Producers: James Iha, Michael Stipe

In 2005, Michael Stipe of R.E.M. recorded a cover of the song with producer James Iha for a Hurricane Katrina relief benefit EP released exclusively through the iTunes Store. Stipe recorded "In the Sun" with Chris Martin of Coldplay and Joseph Arthur himself. Additionally, a remix was provided by Justin Timberlake and will.i.am. This cover of the song was featured on the soundtrack of the film Not as I Pictured (2010) and on the Grey's Anatomy season 2 episode "It's the End of the World".

=== EP track listing ===
1. "In the Sun" (with Chris Martin) – 4:56
2. "In the Sun" (with Chris Martin) (JAW Breakers Remix by Justin Timberlake and will.i.am) – 5:13
3. "In the Sun" (with Joseph Arthur) – 4:58
4. "In the Sun" – 4:55
5. "In the Sun" (Live on Austin City Limits with Coldplay) – 3:40
6. "In the Sun" (Live Acoustic Couch Rehearsal with Joseph Arthur) – 5:53

=== Other cover versions ===
- Peter Gabriel, on the tribute album Diana, Princess of Wales: Tribute (1997). Since Joseph was on Peter Gabriel's Real World label at the time, Joseph allowed the song to be covered by Gabriel even though Joseph himself had yet to record the song for Come to Where I'm From. The song also appears on Gabriel's album of rarities Flotsam and Jetsam.
- Donna De Lory, on her album In the Glow, released by Secret Road Records.
- Howie Day, uncredited, over the ending credits of the film Saved!.
- Aron Wright, featured in season 11 of Grey's Anatomy during the episode "She's Leaving Home".
