= Fistful of Mercy =

American rock band

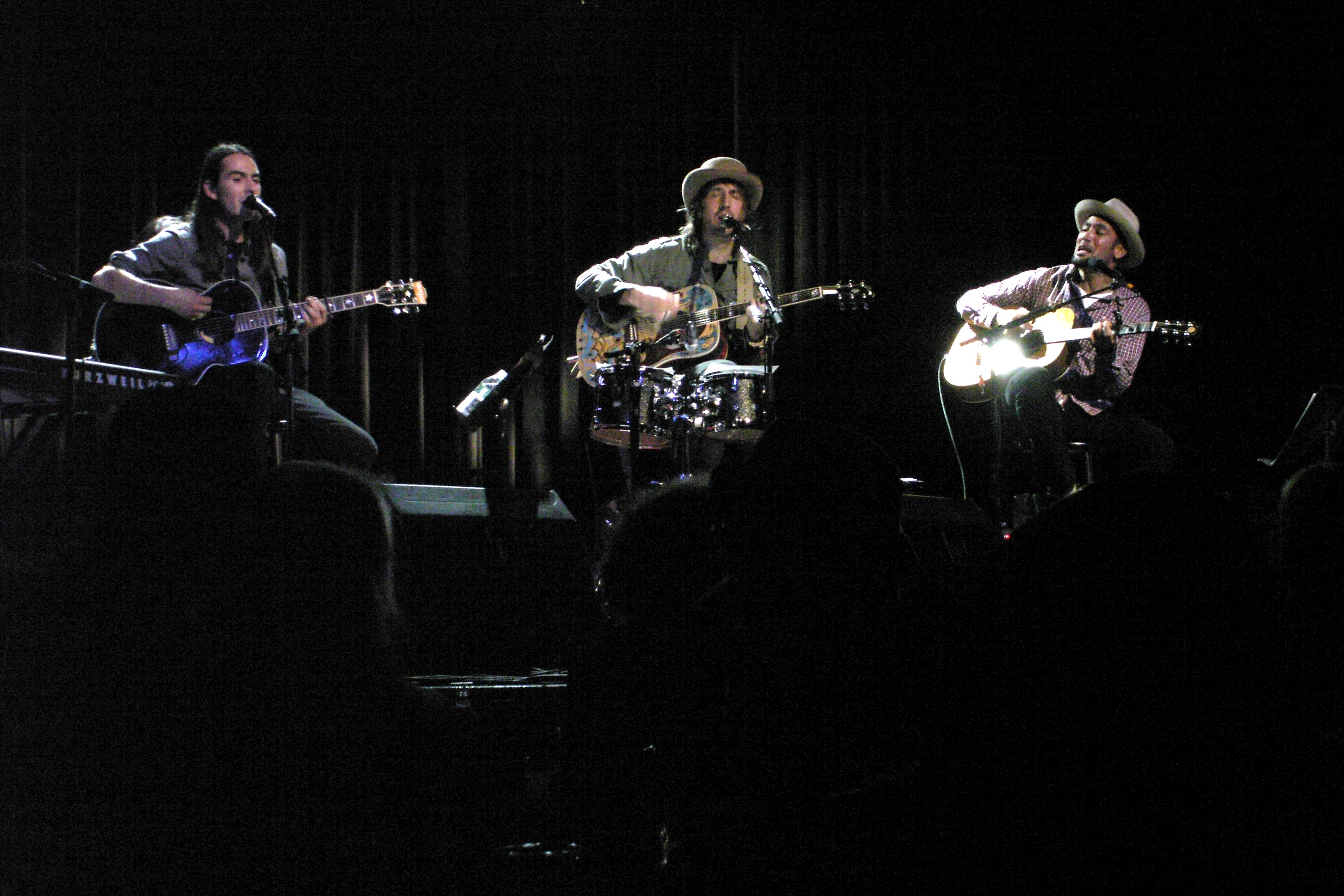

Background information
- Origin: Venice, Los Angeles, United States
- Genres: Rock, folk
- Years active: 2010–present
- Label: Hot Records
- Members: Dhani Harrison; Ben Harper; Joseph Arthur
- Website: FistfulofMercy.com

Fistful of Mercy is a rock group consisting of Dhani Harrison, Ben Harper and Joseph Arthur.

== History ==
The band formed in February 2010, when Arthur asked Harper to accompany him in the studio; Harper then asked Harrison, whom he had met at a skate park in Santa Monica, California, to accompany them. Upon arriving at the Carriage House studio in Los Angeles’ Silverlake neighborhood, the trio went on to write and record nine original acoustic songs. Harrison compared the trio's collaborative process to his father's membership in the Traveling Wilburys.

After recording the nine tracks, Harrison called longtime friend and drummer Jim Keltner to overdub percussion. Violinist Jessy Greene also participated in the recording.

The band subsequently made its live debut in a performance for KCRW's Morning Becomes Eclectic on August 26, 2010. Fistful of Mercy released their debut album As I Call You Down on October 5, 2010, via Harrison's label HOT Records.

The band was mentioned in a storyline of the NBC series Parenthood where a few characters went to a Fistful of Mercy concert in the Season 2 episode "I'm a Lot Cooler Than You Think". Fistful of Mercy's song "In Vain or True" is also played during scenes of the episode. On November 10, the band performed the song "Father's Son" with special guest Tom Morello on the third episode of Conan.

As of February 2013, the band’s official Facebook page stated that it was back in the studio, with a new album coming at a date to be announced; however, no album had been or was slated to be recorded as of the end of 2016. Ben Harper stated in August 2016 that a new album would be forthcoming eventually, but that the three members had not yet found time to record together despite regular contact.

== Discography ==
=== Albums ===
- As I Call You Down (2010)

=== Singles ===
- "Fistful of Mercy" (2010)
