= The Luxury Flats =

American indie rock band

- Also known as: luxury flats, lux fla
- Origin: New York City, United States
- Genres: Indie rock, stoner rock
- Years active: 2004 – 2008
- Members: Joe Vanaman; Damara Rose (Stolfo); Joe Terry; Mikey Corcoran
- Website: Official Web Site

The Luxury Flats was an indie rock band out of Hudson, NY founded in 2004, consisting of four members: Mikey Corcoran, Damara Rose, Joseph Terry, and Joseph Vanaman. All four members of The Luxury Flats play multiple instruments.

== History ==
The band was initially formed by Corcoran and Rose who met while working in New York. Terry and Vanaman then moved to Hudson, NY from Philadelphia, PA in 2005.

The Luxury Flats rented a house in Hudson and lived together there. They made demos and eventually self-released an album called Wrong Side of the Cap Stand and went on some self-booked tours across the USA. Wrong Side of the Cap Stand was produced by Kenny Siegal at Old Soul Studios, engineered by Tom Shick at Old Soul, mixed by Bryce Goggin at Trout Recordings, and mastered by Fred Kevorkian at Avatar Studios. The album art work was done by Nicky Karas and Joe Terry.

The Luxury Flats was named Metroland's best band of 2006 and were featured in a cover story by associate editor John Brodeur in August 2006.

In 2008, The Luxury Flats moved out of the communal living situation and moved on to other ventures.

Corcoran and Terry went on to perform in Husky Bundles out of Philadelphia, PA, Vanaman in Sleeptalker out of Portland, OR, and Rose went solo but occasionally collaborates on her friend's projects.

== Discography ==
- The Cloth Demo - 2004
- The Wax Demo - 2006
- Wrong Side of the Cap Stand - 2007
