= Setting Sun (band) =

American band

- Origin: San Francisco, United States
- Genres: rock, folk, chamber pop, indie rock
- Years active: 2002—present
- Label: Young Love Records
- Members: Gary Levitt with rotating members
- Website: Official Website

Setting Sun is a band with a rotating lineup led by frontman and producer Gary Levitt. The first release was aptly titled 'holed up' and was written and recorded in San Francisco, California.

Driven by simple acoustic guitar lines, graceful string orchestrations, and Levitt's hushed vocals, Setting Sun's songwriting, arrangements and lyrics were called "dramatic and poignant" by NPR. The sound is centered on the song, with poppy hooks and choruses, while mixing synth experimentalism in with its folky, string-band sound. It is tough to characterize the sound of the band as it is crossover between indie-rock, folk and chamber pop music.

Born in Queens New York, Levitt has been playing music since he picked up a guitar in high school and immediately began writing songs. Studying film and music in college, Levitt’s music has taken him around the world, living in San Francisco, Los Angeles, London and New York where he's worked with a wide array of artists and producers, ranging from the highly lauded to musicians far below the radar. Levitt’s songs have appeared in a number of television shows, commercials and films.

Levitt often plays most of the instruments on Setting Sun records, but invites help from friends and other talented musicians for such instruments as violin, cello, trumpet and occasionally drums.

Setting Sun have toured through the US and Europe multiple times, building up a dedicated fan base.

Setting Sun released their 5th record in the summer of 2014 titled 'Be Here When You Get There'. Here's what the editors of iTunes had to say: "For Be Here When You Get There, Setting Sun’s Gary Levitt tightened the songs; all 10 clock in between two and three-plus minutes, as if he’d just listened to the classic pop records of the ‘60s and new wave ‘70s and decided that quickness was key".

After a 10 year hiatus Gary Levitt and Setting Sun returned with the release of ‘The Feelings Cure’, the 6th record from the now NY based songwriter/producer.

== Discography ==
Year	Album
2002	holed up
2004	Math and Magic
2008	Children of the Wild
2008	Children of the Remix (EP)
2010	Fantasurreal
2014	Be Here When You Get There
2023	The Feelings Cure
