= Holding the Void =

Studio album by Holding the Void
- Released: 2003
- Recorded: 2002
- Genre: Alternative rock
- Length: 43:03
- Label: Vein Records
- Producer: Joseph Arthur, Pat Sansone, Rene Lopez

Holding the Void chronology
Redemption's Son (2002)	Holding the Void (2003)	Our Shadows Will Remain (2004)

Holding the Void is the self-titled album by Joseph Arthur's side project of the Void. Holding the Void was recorded in late 2002 and released in early 2003 in limited quantity runs on Arthur's website, and at his live shows. According to Arthur's official website, the album is described as "pure rock 'n' roll". Holding the Void featured Arthur on vocals and guitar, Pat Sansone, of Wilco and The Autumn Defense, on bass and backing vocals, and Rene Lopez (solo musician; frequent collaborator with Joseph Arthur) on drums and backing vocals.

== Track listing ==
All tracks are written by Joseph Arthur, Rene Lopez, and Pat Sansone.

No.	Title	Length
1.	"Candy Store"	2:06
2.	"Blue Jays and Honey Bee"	3:32
3.	"Gone Without It"	4:12
4.	"Miracle"	3:36
5.	"False Colored Eyes"	4:20
6.	"Disposable"	3:51
7.	"Hands Born Dirty"	4:15
8.	"Look Over Your Shoulder"	3:46
9.	"Call a Friend"	4:57
10.	"Nothing Wrong with the City"	4:42
11.	"Don't Be Afraid"	3:51

== Notes ==
- Songs by Joseph Arthur, arranged by Holding the Void
- Recorded by Tom Schick
- Mixed by Tom Schick and Holding the Void
- Mastered by Fred Kevorkian
- Artwork by Joseph Arthur
