= Vagabond Skies =

EP by Joseph Arthur
- Released: June 10, 2008
- Recorded: 2008
- Genre: Alternative rock
- Length: 22:22
- Label: Lonely Astronaut Records
- Producers: Joseph Arthur, Mathias Schneeberger, Mike Napolitano

Joseph Arthur chronology
Crazy Rain (EP) (2008)	Vagabond Skies (2008)	Foreign Girls (EP) (2008)

Professional ratings
Review scores
Source	Rating
AbsolutePunk.net	80% link
Allmusic	not rated link
Bullz-Eye.com	link
Comfort Comes	7.8/10 link
Pitchfork Media	3.8/10 link
PopMatters	4/10 link

Vagabond Skies is an EP by singer-songwriter Joseph Arthur, released June 10, 2008, and is the third in a series of four EPs released in anticipation of Arthur's seventh studio album, Temporary People. According to Arthur, this EP is "more stripped-down, more acoustic and slower...it's more of a late-night type of music."

The EP also marks the first studio recording of "She Paints Me Gold," a song Joseph has often played at his live shows since November 2004. A music video made for "She Paints Me Gold" features a sequential collection of still photographs, taken by Cerise Leang on New Year's Eve 2007, documenting one of Joseph's all-night paintings. Another music video was also produced for "Second Sight," directed by Gabriel Judet-Weinshel, featuring video footage of Joseph lip-synching the song projected onto a billboard over Lafayette Street and Grand Street on the Lower East Side of Manhattan.

== Track listing ==
All tracks are written by Joseph Arthur.

No.	Title	Length
1.	"Slow Me Down"	3:01
2.	"Even When Yer Blue"	3:17
3.	"Pretty Good Company"	3:05
4.	"She Paints Me Gold"	5:33
5.	"Second Sight"	3:58
6.	"It's Too Late"	3:28

== Notes ==
- Produced by Joseph Arthur, Mathias Schneeberger, and Mike Napolitano.
- Musicians:
  - Joseph Arthur: vocals, guitar, bass, percussion, drums, keyboards, programming
  - Mathias Schneeberger: electric guitar
  - Kenny Siegal: acoustic guitar, piano
  - Joan Wasser: violin, background vocals
  - Greg Wieczorek: drums
  - Ethan Eubanks: drums
  - Rene Lopez: drums
  - Cat Martino: background vocals on "She Paints Me Gold"
- Art direction and packaging design by Joseph Arthur.
- Photography by Danny Clinch.
- Lonely Astronaut Records #LA005.
