= Joseph Arthur =

American singer-songwriter (born 1971)

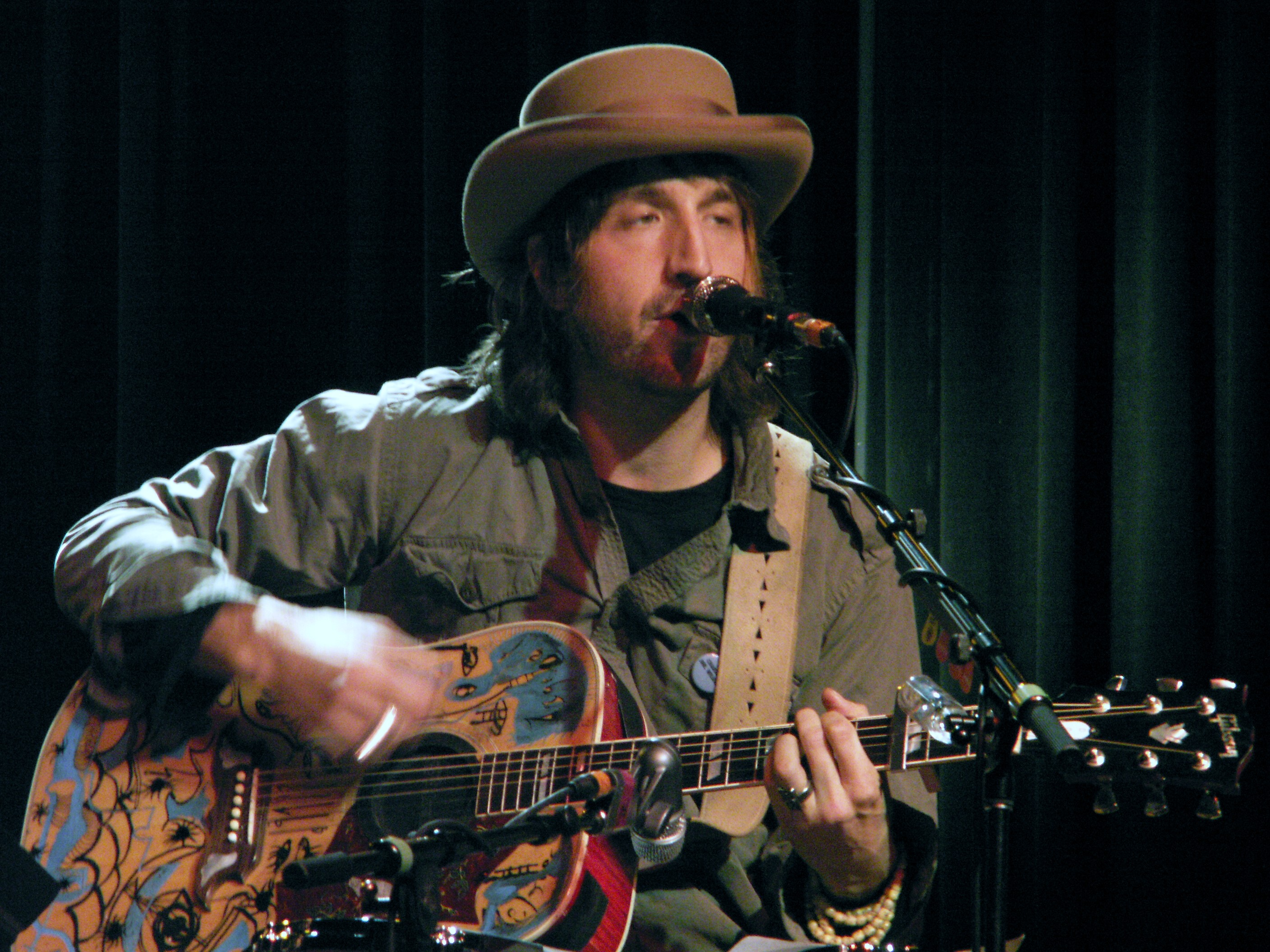
- Arthur performing with Fistful of Mercy in 2010

Background information
- Born: September 28, 1971 (age 55); Akron, Ohio, U.S.
- Genres: Alternative rock; folk rock; indie folk; world
- Occupation: Musician
- Instruments: Vocals; guitar; harmonica; bass; keyboards
- Years active: 1987–present
- Labels: Lonely Astronaut, Real World, Republic
- Member of: The Lonely Astronauts; Fistful of Mercy; RNDM
- Website: josepharthur.com

Joseph Lyburn Arthur (born September 28, 1971) is an American singer-songwriter and artist from Akron, Ohio. He is best known for his solo material, and as a member of Fistful of Mercy and RNDM. Arthur has built his reputation over the years through critically acclaimed releases and constant touring; his unique solo live performances often incorporate the use of a number of distortion and loop pedals, and his shows are recorded live at the soundboard and made available to concertgoers immediately following the show on recordable media.

Arthur was discovered by Peter Gabriel in the mid-1990s, and signed to Gabriel's Real World label as the first North American artist on the label's roster. Arthur released his debut album, Big City Secrets (1997), and follow-up, Come to Where I'm From (2000), on Real World before signing with various independent labels between 2002 and 2006. He established his own record label, Lonely Astronaut Records, in 2006, and released two studio albums, Let's Just Be (2007) and Temporary People (2008) with backing band The Lonely Astronauts. Arthur subsequently returned to performing and recording as a solo artist, releasing The Graduation Ceremony in 2011 and the double album, Redemption City in 2012.

In 2013, Arthur started a Pledge Music campaign to fund the release of his tenth studio album, The Ballad of Boogie Christ. The album was released on June 11, 2013.

Arthur is also an acclaimed painter and designer; his artwork has appeared on all of his releases, with the sleeve design for his 1999 extended play Vacancy being nominated for a Grammy Award for Best Recording Package.

== Musical career ==
=== Early life and Big City Secrets ===
Arthur began writing and playing music in his early teens, after inheriting an electronic keyboard from his aunt. At age 16, he played bass in a blues band called Frankie Starr and the Chill Factor, which disbanded by 1995. Initially, Arthur sought to become a noted bass guitarist, stating: "I never started singing until I was in my early 20s. I remember thinking, 'OK – I am not a singer, I am a musician.' I wanted to be this like heroic bass player so I listened to people like Jaco Pastorius, to Bitches Brew over and over again. And then like Nirvana came out and I was blown away and then I got into Bob Dylan. Around that time I started playing acoustic guitar and realized I could actually write songs if I wasn't playing complicated bass lines."

Arthur graduated from Firestone High School in 1990 and continued developing his music. In the early 1990s, Arthur relocated to Atlanta, Georgia, continuing to record home demos, playing local clubs and working as a guitar salesman at Clark Music Store.

In 1996, Peter Gabriel's A&R associate Harvey Schwartz presented Gabriel with a demo of Arthur's first EP, Cut and Blind which was given to him by Mikel K, the man in which the third song on Big City Secrets was named. Gabriel and Schwartz arranged a live audition at The Fez nightclub in New York City, and Arthur flew up from Atlanta. The night was a success; not only was Lou Reed a guest in the audience, but within a few months Arthur was officially signed, making him the first American recording artist signed to Gabriel's label. Arthur recorded his debut album at Gabriel's Real World Studios in England with producer Markus Dravs (Björk, Coldplay, Arcade Fire). The debut album Big City Secrets was released worldwide in spring 1997, and Arthur joined Gabriel's WOMAD tour in Europe. Big City Secrets displayed Arthur's often angsty and emotionally wrought lyrics coupled with diverse instrumentation, which he himself described as "someone struggling to heal over experimental folk-rock", but went virtually unnoticed by the mainstream. Two years later, he recorded an EP called Vacancy, which earned him a Grammy nomination in 2000 for best recording package.

=== 2000–2003: Come to Where I'm From and Redemption's Son ===
In April 2000, Arthur released his sophomore studio album Come to Where I'm From, which was co-produced with T-Bone Burnett and Tchad Blake. The album exhibited a more polished and accessible sound, and received positive accolades from Pitchfork Media and Entertainment Weekly. Arthur began playing for larger audiences, opening for Ben Harper and Gomez. During that same period, he released a promotional live album recorded at the Gypsy Tea Room bar in Dallas, Texas.

After releasing a series of four EPs called Junkyard Hearts, which were only available to purchase at his live shows, his third album, Redemption's Son, came out in May 2002 in the UK. The American release was delayed until November 2002 since Arthur had been dropped by EMI in North America, having been picked up by Universal Music Group imprint Enjoy Records. The double album furthered the themes of emotional and spiritual dislocation found on Come to Where I'm From, and was described by Allmusic reviewer Thom Jurek as a "sleeper hit".

While on tour, Arthur regularly released recordings of his performances soon after each show. He also recorded an album with alternative rock side project Holding the Void, featuring himself on vocals and guitar, Pat Sansone on vocals and bass, and Rene Lopez on vocals and drums. In Summer 2003, he toured with Tracy Chapman in the US.

=== 2004–2006: Our Shadows Will Remain ===
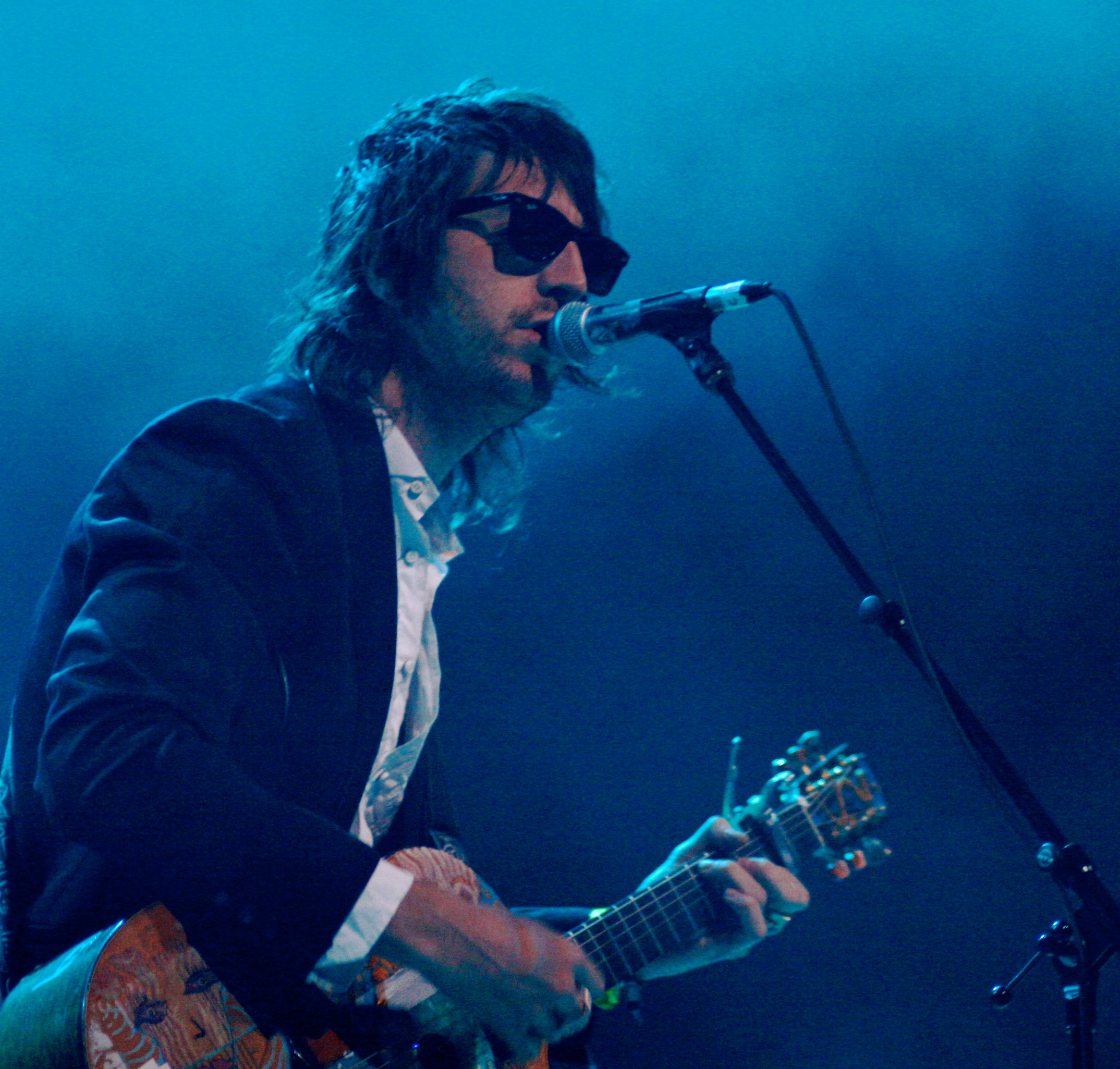
Arthur performing in Spain, 2007

Arthur signed a new recording contract with Vector Recordings and began recording his fourth studio album, Our Shadows Will Remain across New Orleans, New York City, London, and Prague. The album was released in September 2004, and was Arthur's first album to feature string arrangements, provided by the City of Prague Philharmonic. The album was released to widespread critical acclaim; Allmusic's Thom Jurek awarded the album 4.5 out of 5 stars, praising that, "Arthur is in a class of his own and Our Shadows Will Remain is a monstrous, memorable outing, his finest moment in a career that is thus far full of them." Entertainment Weekly gave the album an A rating, hailing the album as "especially forceful and cohesive"; The Guardian hailed that Joseph "might just be a genuine mad genius"; Stylus Magazine gave the album an A− rating; and Chris Rubin of Rolling Stone named Our Shadows Will Remain as the number 1 album of the year 2004 in the year-end critics' pick list.

Arthur toured the US alone and with Joan Wasser to promote the album, and a new EP called And the Thieves Are Gone, which collected unreleased tracks from the Shadows recording sessions, came out in December. Shortly afterward, Arthur went on a brief tour of Europe with R.E.M. Our Shadows Will Remain was picked up by 14th Floor Records for distribution in the United Kingdom in 2005, which yielded the release of four singles: "Can't Exist" in July, "Even Tho" in September, "Devil's Broom" in February 2006 to coincide with his first headlining appearance at London's Shepherd's Bush Empire, and a reissue of "Can't Exist" in May 2006, although none of the singles charted on the UK Singles Chart.

In August 2006, Joseph was invited to help launch the project A River Blue, where a group of young people in northern Uganda were brought together to participate in a music, drama, and art festival. Joseph also recorded the song "A River Blue" for the foundation.

=== 2006–2007: Lonely Astronaut Records, Nuclear Daydream, and Let's Just Be ===
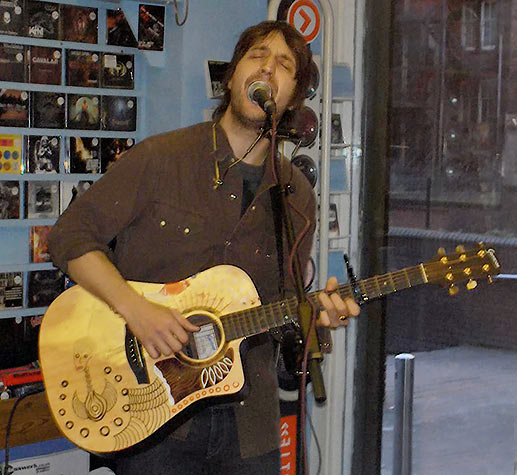
Arthur performing at Avalanche Records in Glasgow, February 2006

In 2006, Arthur started the record label Lonely Astronaut Records with longtime professional partner Lauren Pattenaude. He released a book entitled We Almost Made It, a visual collection of his artworks, along with an accompanying instrumental CD titled The Invisible Parade in May 2006. In September 2006, Arthur released his fifth studio album, Nuclear Daydream, which was recorded in Berlin and Los Angeles. The album would be the first release on his new label. Joseph then embarked on a worldwide tour with his new backing band, The Lonely Astronauts.

His song "In the Sun" was covered by Michael Stipe of R.E.M. and Chris Martin of Coldplay in 2006 for a Hurricane Katrina relief EP. The EP includes six versions of the song, one featuring Arthur himself singing with Stipe and another remixed by Justin Timberlake, and is available only on iTunes. On March 26, 2007, Joseph's then-UK label 14th Floor Records released a re-recorded version of his 2002 song "Honey and the Moon" as a special single in the UK only. In April, he released his sixth studio album, Let's Just Be, and embarked on an extensive US tour. This was Joseph's first album with The Lonely Astronauts; the band recorded as many as 80 songs in late 2006, with only sixteen appearing on the album. The album was released to lukewarm critical reception, with Pitchfork Media calling the album "unfocused" and "sloppy", summarizing that the album "sounds like it came together on the fly, in jam sessions that didn't stem from any kind of solid idea."

In 2007, Joseph contributed vocals to the track "Aggro" from The Ideal Condition by Paul Hartnoll.

=== Temporary People and solo EPs (2008–2009) ===
In 2008, Arthur released four EPs in a four-month span: Could We Survive on March 18, Crazy Rain on April 15, Vagabond Skies on June 10, and Foreign Girls on July 8. Regarding these releases, Arthur noted, "I have so much music piled up, like strange animals in a cosmic cage begging for release. The jails were overcrowded. I had to let some of them go." He played seven solo shows during the SXSW 2008 Festival, six in Austin and one in Dallas. Live dates in Europe and an extensive US solo tour coincided with the new releases. Temporary People, his seventh full-length studio album and second with The Lonely Astronauts, was released on September 30, 2008. The album was received warmly by critics, with The Times Online stating that it "evokes the loose, rocking swagger and country melancholy of early-1970s Stones", and Crawdaddy! noting that Arthur "treats his audience to a brawny and brooding rock album, notching his most fully realized LP to date in the process." The album came out in Europe in late October, and afterward Arthur embarked on a solo tour and opened for Tracy Chapman on her six-week "Our Bright Future" European tour, followed by tour dates in Canada.

Arthur recorded a cover of The Afghan Whigs's "Step into the Light" from their 1996 album Black Love for the tribute album, Summer's Kiss: A Tribute to The Afghan Whigs. Following UK tour dates with The Lonely Astronauts in July, Arthur embarked on a solo tour of France in October 2009. A reissue of his 2006 album Nuclear Daydream with six previously unreleased bonus tracks was released during this tour.

=== Fistful of Mercy, The Graduation Ceremony, Redemption City, and RNDM (2010–2012) ===
Arthur, Ben Harper, and Dhani Harrison formed the supergroup trio Fistful of Mercy in 2010, and their debut album As I Call You Down was released on October 5, 2010. Arthur's first solo studio album since Nuclear Daydream, titled The Graduation Ceremony, was released on May 23, 2011.

In 2012, Arthur released a double album, Redemption City, and collaborated with Pearl Jam's Jeff Ament in the band, RNDM.

=== The Ballad of Boogie Christ (2013) ===
In 2013, Arthur began using Pledge Music to fund the release of his new studio album, The Ballad of Boogie Christ. In a statement, Arthur noted, "With the music business being what it is nowadays, unless you break out big or become a license darling, there are precious few alternatives to fund one's work. Some say it's sad that it has come to this but I'm optimistic that new ways of doing things can lead to new forms of creativity and a smaller world community for artists to get to know their fans or for fans to become a more vital part in the process of artists creating their diamonds."

=== Lou (2014) ===
Following Lou Reed's death, Arthur released an album of covers of his songs.

=== Days of Surrender (2015) ===
Arthur's liner notes for the record are as follows: "I made this record mostly alone in my small studio in Brooklyn. Played all the instruments and sang all the songs, engineered it as well. Except for when I recorded the drums (And then Merritt Jacob lent me his expertise and enthusiasm. Nothing gets done without enthusiasm so thanks, Merritt.)"

=== The Family (2016) ===
For this release, Joseph Arthur acquired a Steinway Vertegrand piano from the early 1900s, moved it into his Red Hook, Brooklyn studio and saved it from the storm (Hurricane Sandy) by propping it up on cinderblocks, while the neighborhood flooded. He learned some of its history: the piano had been a part of the same family for a century, somewhere in Connecticut. Written entirely on that piano, The Family (Real World Records) is mostly a work of fiction and a meditation on the idea of family. The album was released June 3, 2016 to rave reviews.

=== Arthur Buck (2018) ===
In June 2018, Arthur released Arthur Buck, an album recorded with R.E.M.'s guitarist Peter Buck.

=== Come Back World (2019) ===
2019 saw Arthur release of full length solo album Come Back World, on his own label Moon Age Rebel - produced by Arthur and Chris Seefried. The album features backing vocals from Ben Harper, Jesse Malin, Marley Monroe, and Morgan James.

=== "Stop the Shot" ===
In 2021, Arthur released "Stop the Shot", a song that includes the lyrics "So take me uptown, baby / I don't want to make a fuss / And keep your graphene oxide out of me / Baby, I don't want to rust".

== Visual art ==
Arthur has also received acclaim as a painter and designer. His artwork has appeared on the sleeves of his entire discography, notably the album covers for Come to Where I'm From and Our Shadows Will Remain, which included a 36-page booklet featuring prints of his original artwork, and was released with a die-cut outer slipcase sleeve. Arthur and frequent graphic design collaborator Zachary Larner's sleeve design for the 1999 extended play Vacancy was nominated for a Grammy Award for Best Recording Package. He staged his first art exhibition in 2006 at the Vertigo Gallery in London from February 10 to 12, and released a 110-page book entitled We Almost Made It, a visual collection of his artworks, along with an accompanying instrumental CD titled The Invisible Parade in May 2006.

He set up his personal art gallery The Museum of Modern Arthur in June 2007 as a brick and mortar location in Brooklyn's DUMBO District. According to an article on Stereogum.com, Joseph and the MOMAR were evicted from the building. Joseph held a record release party for Temporary People before the closing of the gallery in September 2008. The MOMAR gallery soon morphed into an online gallery.

== Live performances ==
Arthur's one man band live performances incorporate looping techniques and several distortion techniques. His live performances are recorded through to the last note and then burnt to CD-R. They are sold immediately to fans after the concert. Beginning with his fall 2006 tour, Arthur incorporated a full band, The Lonely Astronauts. They are no longer together.

The Lonely Astronauts:

- Joseph Arthur – vocals, guitar
- Kraig Jarret Johnson – guitar, keyboards, vocals
- Jennifer "Jen" Turner – guitar, vocals
- Sibyl Buck – bass, vocals
- Greg Wieczorek – drums, vocals

== Instruments and loops ==
Of the guitars that Joseph utilizes, his primary acoustic guitar is an Irish Lowden 012C. Some of Joseph's other guitars include a Garrison G-50-CE, a custom-painted Godin Kingpin CWII, a Gibson ES-335, and a 1970s Fender Strat. As of 2019, Joseph is pictured in video clips playing a custom painted Fender Acoustasonic.

To incorporate his looping techniques, Arthur uses various rack-mounted units of the Lexicon JamMan. He plays his guitars through an impressive bank of effects pedals. When performing solo live, he often records a sample of guitar, percussion, or vocals which he can then loop periodically throughout a song, allowing him to perform verses with the added effect of harmonizing with himself.

== Podcast: Come to Where I'm From ==
In 2019 Joseph Arthur launched a podcast entitled, Come to Where I'm From, named after his 2000 release. The podcast was produced by Ehud Lazin who also appears on the podcast. The podcast was hosted by Joseph Arthur and was recorded in the East Village, New York City.

The show was a long-form interview/conversation format discussing the creative process, health and fitness, psychology, diet, current events, spirituality, poetry, rock n roll, and Art. Many of the topics were personal, where Arthur talks candidly about his experiences.

The final episode (#130) was posted in July 2021.

== Personal life ==
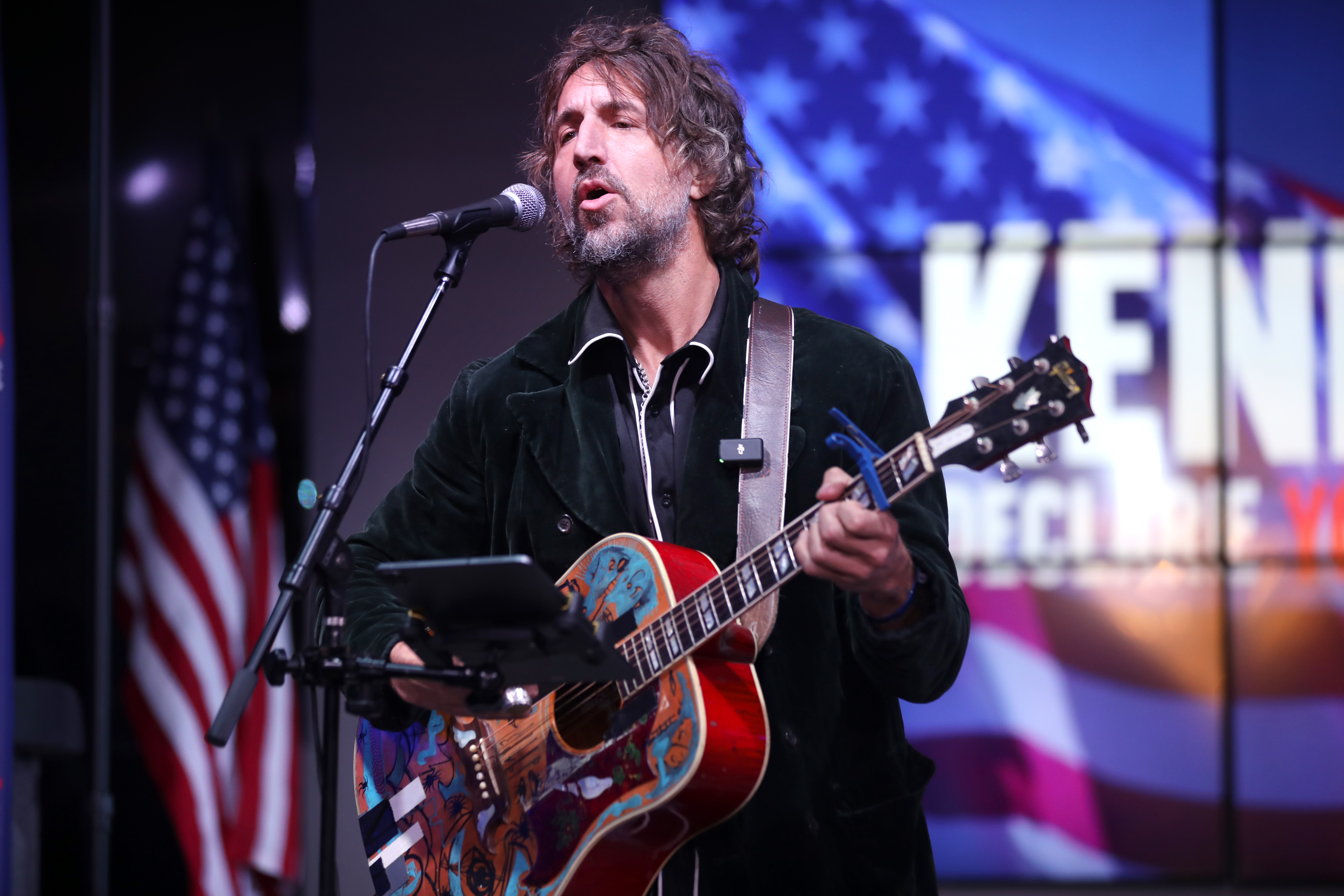
Arthur performing at a campaign rally in support of independent presidential candidate Robert F. Kennedy Jr. in December 2023.

Arthur identifies as Christian. He champions fitness, wellness, but also homeopathic remedies. He and his former girlfriend, Anna Sophia, have one daughter, Alessia, who was born in July 2021.

== Discography ==
=== Studio albums ===
- Big City Secrets (1997)
- Come to Where I'm From (2000)
- Redemption's Son (2002)
- Our Shadows Will Remain (2004)
- Nuclear Daydream (2006)
- Let's Just Be (2007)
- Temporary People (2008)
- The Graduation Ceremony (2011)
- Redemption City (2012)
- The Ballad of Boogie Christ (2013)
- The Ballad of Boogie Christ Act II (2013)
- Lou: The Songs of Lou Reed (2014)
- Days of Surrender (2015)
- The Family (2016)
- Arthur Buck (2018)
- Come Back World (2019)
- Arthur Buck 2 (2025)

=== EPs ===
- Cut and Blind (August 1996)
- Vacancy (May 11, 1999)
- Junkyard Hearts I (February 15, 2002)
- Junkyard Hearts II (February 28, 2002)
- Junkyard Hearts III (March 15, 2002)
- Junkyard Hearts IV (March 28, 2002)
- And the Thieves Are Gone (December 7, 2004)
- Could We Survive (March 18, 2008)
- Crazy Rain (April 15, 2008)
- Vagabond Skies (June 10, 2008)
- Foreign Girls (July 8, 2008)

== Soundtracks ==
=== Film ===
- Hell's Kitchen (1998) ("Invisible Hands", "Lost Gypsy Weapon", "Eyes on My Back", "Pictures of Life", "Cinderella Under Glass", "Big City Secret", "Good About Me", "Crying Like a Man", "Porcupine")
- Shrek 2 (2004) ("You're So True")
- Bone Collector (1999) ("Bed of Nails")
- Shallow Hal (2001) ("Chemical")
- Wasted (2002) ("In the Sun")
- The Bourne Identity (2002) ("In the Sun")
- American Pie 3 (2003) ("Honey and the Moon")
- Saved! (2004) ("In the Sun")

=== Television ===
- Dawson's Creek (2000) ("In the Sun")
- The OC (2003) ("Honey and the Moon")
- The OC (2005) ("A Smile That Explodes")
- Scrubs (2006) ("In the Sun")
- House (2007, 2008) ("My Home is Your Head", "Could We Survive")
- True Blood (2008) ("Stumble and Pain")
- Hung (2009) ("Walk Away")
- Numb3rs (2009) ("Killer's Knife")
- Late Night with Jimmy Fallon (2010) ("Father's Son")
- Conan (2011) ("Father's Son")
- The L Word ("In the Sun")
- Scorpion ("You are Free")
