= Lonely Astronaut Records =

- Founded: 2006
- Founder: Joseph Arthur; Lauren Pattenaude; Eric Gerber
- Distributor(s): RED Distribution; Sony
- Genre: Indie rock Folk rock Alternative rock
- Country of origin: United States
- Official website: www.lonelyastronauts.com

Lonely Astronaut Records is a record label founded by musician Joseph Arthur, his long-time professional partner Lauren Pattenaude, and Eric Gerber. The label was created in 2006. Thus far, the label has only its founder Joseph Arthur on the roster, which also includes releases produced with his band The Lonely Astronauts.

== Roster ==
- Joseph Arthur

== Catalog ==
- 001: Nuclear Daydream (September 19, 2006)
- 002: Let's Just Be (April 17, 2007)
- 003: Could We Survive (EP) (March 18, 2008)
- 004: Crazy Rain (EP) (April 15, 2008)
- 005: Vagabond Skies (EP) (June 10, 2008)
- 006: Foreign Girls (EP) (July 8, 2008)
- 007: Temporary People (September 30, 2008)
- 008: Temporary People (12" vinyl LP) (February 3, 2009)
- 009: The Graduation Ceremony (May 24, 2011)

== See also ==
- List of record labels
