= Come to Where I'm From =

Studio album by Joseph Arthur
- Released: April 11, 2000
- Studios: Sound City Studios, Van Nuys, California; Sunset Sound Recorders, Hollywood, California; Real World Studios, Bath, Somerset, England
- Genre: Alternative rock
- Length: 56:04
- Label: Real World/Virgin
- Producers: T Bone Burnett; Rick Will; Joseph Arthur

Joseph Arthur chronology
Vacancy (EP) (1999)	Come to Where I'm From (2000)	Junkyard Hearts EPs (2002)

Singles from Come to Where I'm From
- 1. "Chemical" Released: June 26, 2000; 2. "In the Sun" Released: April 23, 2001; 3. "Exhausted" Released: 2001 (promo only)

Come to Where I'm From is the second studio album by Joseph Arthur, released by Real World Records on April 11, 2000. The album was co-produced by T Bone Burnett, and features the singles "Chemical" and "In the Sun". Arthur said, "I wanted to get the songs down in a way that was true to them and true to myself. I really wanted them to have humanity in them. I wanted an element of a gamble in it. I think too much music sounds too contained. I wanted it to sound like it could go out of control at any minute. I didn't want it produced to death."

Real World Records reissued the album in July 2012, as a part of their Real World Gold series.

== Critical reception ==
Professional ratings
Aggregate scores
Source	Rating
Metacritic	83/100
Review scores
Source	Rating
AllMusic	3.5/5 stars
Entertainment Weekly	A−
Mojo	4.5/5 stars
Now	3/5 stars
Pitchfork	7.4/10
Q	4/5 stars
The Sydney Morning Herald	4/5 stars
Tom Hull – on the Web	B

Come to Where I'm From was met with "universal acclaim" reviews from critics. At Metacritic, which assigns a weighted average rating out of 100 to reviews from mainstream publications, this release received an average score of 83, based on 8 reviews.

== Track listing ==
All tracks are written by Joseph Arthur.

No.	Title	Length
1.	"In the Sun"	5:36
2.	"Ashes Everywhere"	4:51
3.	"Chemical"	4:11
4.	"History"	5:40
5.	"Invisible Hands"	5:14
6.	"Cockroach"	3:02
7.	"Exhausted"	4:46
8.	"Eyes on My Back"	4:03
9.	"Tattoo"	4:10
10.	"The Real You"	5:27
11.	"Creation or a Stain"	4:34
12.	"Speed of Light"	4:30

Japanese CD bonus track
No.	Title	Length
13.	"Ask the Dust"	6:50

== Rusty Water ==
On March 11, 1999, a promo CD titled Rusty Water was released via Virgin Records. The CD featured 13 tracks, most of which would later be re-recorded, edited, and remixed to become Come to Where I'm From. As this was not the official finalized release, few promos were made.

1. "Crawlin' on Bones" (a.k.a. "Cockroach") – 3:04
2. "In the Sun" (Early Version) – 5:24
3. "Exhausted" (Early Version) – 4:03
4. "History" – 5:37
5. "Chemical" – 4:06
6. "Cocaine Blind" – 3:17
7. "Freeze You Out" – 4:30
8. "Tattoo" – 4:07
9. "Eyes on My Back" – 4:12
10. "In the Distance" – 3:24
11. "California" – 4:14
12. "Otherside" – 3:16
13. "Invisible Hands" – 5:26

Note

- The songs "Cocaine Blind" and "Otherside" (later renamed "The Other Side") appeared as B-sides to the "In the Sun" single. "California", "Freeze You Out", and "In the Distance" have not been released or re-recorded since this promo was issued.

== Personnel ==
=== Musicians ===
- Joseph Arthur (as "Benzo") – guitar and vocals on all tracks.
- Carla Azar (as "Darkstar") – drums on tracks 2, 3, 6, 8, 9, 10, 11 and 12; background vocals on track 6; shaker on track 8.
- T Bone Burnett (as "Yodaclaus") – piano on track 6.
- Markus Dravs (as "Luvclaw") – programming on tracks 4 and 7.
- Eugene Kelly (as "Eugene") – "Fuzzheart" on track 11.
- Ben Findlay (as "Spiralchugger") – additional acoustic guitar on track 4.
- Nadia Lanman (as "Queenchina") – cello on track 1.
- Jim Keltner (as "Nighttime") – drums on track 5.
- Stella Katsoudas (as "Siren") – background vocals on track 1.
- Rick Will (as "Lovehammer") – "explosions" on track 5; synthesizer on tracks 7 and 9; "kooky shit" on track 11.

=== Production and design ===
- Produced by T Bone Burnett, Joseph Arthur and Rick Will.
- Mixed by Rick Will, except:
  - Tracks 1, 5 and 12 mixed by Tchad Blake.
- Engineered by Rick Will.
- Additional engineering by Ben Findlay.
- Assistant engineering by Nick Raskulinecz and Kevin Dean Marek.
- Recorded at Sound City, Sunset Sound and Real World Studios.
- Mastered by Stephen Marcussen at A&M Mastering.
- Album cover drawings and paintings by Joseph Arthur.
- Booklet photography by Anton Corbijn.
- Art direction and design by Zachary James Larner with Joseph Arthur at Bombshelter NYC.
