= Redemption's Son =

- European cover

Studio album by Joseph Arthur
- Released: May 20, 2002 (UK); November 26, 2002 (US)
- Recorded: Ernest Hemingway Studios, NYC
- Genre: Alternative rock
- Length: 73:13 (UK version); 74:55 (US version)
- Labels: Real World Records; Enjoy Records
- Producers: Joseph Arthur, Ben Findlay

Joseph Arthur chronology
Junkyard Hearts EPs (2002)	Redemption's Son (2002)	Holding the Void (2003)

Professional ratings
Review scores
Source	Rating
Allmusic	link
The Austin Chronicle	4/5 stars
Billboard	3.5/5 stars
Blender	6/10
Mojo	4/5 stars
The A.V. Club/The Onion	3.5/5 stars
Q	3/5 stars
Rolling Stone	link
Uncut	4/5 stars

Redemption's Son is the third studio album by Joseph Arthur. The double album was first released in the UK only on May 20, 2002, due to Joseph being dropped by Virgin Records/EMI in the US. Eventually, Enjoy Records picked up the record and released it stateside on November 26, 2002 with a slightly different track listing and alternate artwork.

Real World/Virgin released the album Come to Where I'm From in the States, but when Arthur wanted to start his next project, Virgin backed off. But his overactive muse couldn't wait for corporate support, so he jumped into recording regardless. Arthur ended up with Redemption's Son, plus another two albums' worth of songs, which were released over the course of four EPs called Junkyard Hearts 1-4 (available on his website and at performances). "I make three or four records a year, but I've only been able to get 'em out every two or three years," says Arthur.

The song "September Baby" was covered by Joseph's friend Greg Connors, and appeared on Connors' 2009 album Full Moon Flashlight. Hubcap City's Bill Taft also features in the song, providing a haunting cornet solo to the song.

== Track listing ==
All tracks are written by Joseph Arthur.

UK Version
No.	Title	Length
1.	"Redemption's Son"	4:34
2.	"Honey and the Moon"	4:44
3.	"You Could Be in Jail"	3:11
4.	"I Would Rather Hide"	4:03
5.	"Innocent World"	3:53
6.	"September Baby"	4:52
7.	"Nation of Slaves"	5:54
8.	"Evidence"	4:13
9.	"Buy a Bag"	2:34
10.	"The Termite Song"	9:23
11.	"Permission"	5:18
12.	"Favorite Girl"	6:09
13.	"You Are the Dark"	3:37
14.	"In the Night"	2:20
15.	"Blue Lips"	4:19
16.	"You've Been Loved"	4:11

US Version
No.	Title	Length
1.	"Redemption's Son"	4:34
2.	"Honey and the Moon"	4:44
3.	"Dear Lord"	4:05
4.	"I Would Rather Hide"	4:03
5.	"Innocent World"	3:53
6.	"September Baby"	4:52
7.	"Nation of Slaves"	5:54
8.	"Evidence"	4:18
9.	"Let's Embrace"	3:15
10.	"The Termite Song"	9:23
11.	"Permission"	5:18
12.	"Favorite Girl"	6:09
13.	"You Are the Dark"	3:37
14.	"In the Night"	2:20
15.	"Blue Lips"	4:19
16.	"You've Been Loved"	4:11

== Singles ==
In the US, Enjoy Records released a promo-only radio single for "Honey and the Moon" in January 2003. In the UK, the song was re-recorded for release as a single in 2007. Additionally, three other songs from the album were released as promo-only singles in the UK and US.

- "In the Night" (UK promo, July 8, 2002)
- "I Would Rather Hide" (UK promo, 2002)
- "Honey and the Moon" (US promo, January 2003)
- "Nation of Slaves" (US promo, 2003)
- "Honey and the Moon" (new radio edit) (March 26, 2007)

== Are You With Us? ==
In 2002, a promo CD titled Are You With Us? was released via Virgin Records. The CD featured 15 tracks, most of which would appear on the finalized track listing of Redemption's Son. As this was not the official finalized release, and considering that Joseph was dropped by Virgin Records, few promos were made.

1. "I Would Rather Hide"
2. "Forgive Your Heart"
3. "Permission"
4. "Innocent World"
5. "You Could Be in Jail"
6. "Nation of Slaves"
7. "You've Been Loved"
8. "Let's Embrace"
9. "Evidence"
10. "Buy a Bag"
11. "September Baby"
12. "Honey and the Moon"
13. "Build Back Up"
14. "Blue Lips"
15. "You Are the Dark"

"Forgive Your Heart" is an unreleased track. "Build Back Up" is a song Joseph wrote shortly after the September 11 attacks. The song first appeared on the compilation album Wish You Were Here: Love Songs for New York in April 2002.

== Album credits ==
- All songs written by Joseph Arthur.
- Produced by Joseph Arthur, except:
  - "Buy a Bag," "The Termite Song," and "Favorite Girl" produced by Joseph Arthur and Ben Findlay.
- Additional production by Pat Sansone, Mike Napolitano, and Tchad Blake.
- Recorded at Ernest Hemingway Studios, Mike Napolitano Studios, Sear Sound, The Magic Shop, Real World, and Tony Berg's place.
- Mixed by Tchad Blake at Real World Studios; assisted by Claire Lewis and Marco Migliari, except:
  - "Favorite Girl" mixed by Ben Findlay.
- Mastered by Bob Ludwig at Gateway Mastering.
1. "Redemption's Son"
  - Joseph Arthur - vocals, guitars, synthesizer
  - Pat Sansone - bass, mellotron
  - Greg Wieczorek - drums
  - Rene Lopez - percussion
  - Engineered by Mike Napolitano
2. "Honey and the Moon"
  - Joseph Arthur - vocals, guitars, synthesizer
  - Pat Sansone - bass, mellotron
  - Ged Lynch - drums
  - Cyro Baptista - percussion
  - Engineered by Roger Moutenot and Tchad Blake
3. "You Could Be in Jail"
  - Joseph Arthur - vocals, guitars, synthesizers, bass, drums, programming
  - Engineered by Joseph Arthur and Mike Napolitano
3. "Dear Lord"
  - Joseph Arthur - vocals, guitars, harmonica
  - Pat Sansone - bass, organ
  - Greg Wieczorek - drums
  - Engineered by Roger Moutenot
4. "I Would Rather Hide"
  - Joseph Arthur - lead and background vocals, guitars, synthesizers
  - Pat Sansone - bass, mellotron, lead guitar, background vocals
  - Greg Wieczorek - drums
  - Engineered by Mike Napolitano
5. "Innocent World"
  - Joseph Arthur - vocals, guitars, synthesizers, drums
  - Pat Sansone - mellotron
  - Cyro Baptista - percussion
  - Engineered by Ben Findlay
6. "September Baby"
  - Joseph Arthur - lead and background vocals, guitars, synthesizer
  - Pat Sansone - bass, mellotron, percussion, background vocals
  - Greg Wieczorek - drums
  - Engineered by Roger Moutenot
7. "Nation of Slaves"
  - Joseph Arthur - vocals, guitars, synthesizers, bass, programming
  - Ben Perowsky - drums
  - Engineered by Joseph Arthur and Roger Moutenot
8. "Evidence"
  - Joseph Arthur - vocals, guitars, synthesizers, bass, programming
  - Engineered by Joseph Arthur and Mike Napolitano
9. "Buy a Bag"
  - Joseph Arthur - vocals, guitars, bass, programming
  - Engineered by Ben Findlay
9. "Let's Embrace"
  - Joseph Arthur - vocals, guitars
  - Pat Sansone - bass
  - Greg Wieczorek - drums
  - Engineered by Roger Moutenot and Mike Napolitano
10. "The Termite Song"
  - Joseph Arthur - vocals, guitars, piano, moog, bass, hammer dulcimer, programming
  - Engineered by Ben Findlay
11. "Permission"
  - Joseph Arthur - vocals, guitars, synthesizers, bass, drums, programming
  - Engineered by Joseph Arthur and Mike Napolitano
12. "Favorite Girl"
  - Joseph Arthur - lead and background vocals, guitars, piano, bass
  - Nadia Lanman - cellos
  - Dave Power - drums
  - Ben Findlay - background vocals
  - Engineered by Ben Findlay
13. "You Are the Dark"
  - Joseph Arthur - vocals, guitar, synthesizer, fretless basses, "thunderstorm"
  - Engineered by Joseph Arthur
14. "In the Night"
  - Joseph Arthur - lead and background vocals, guitars, synthesizer
  - Pat Sansone - bass, electric piano, background vocals
  - Greg Wieczorek - drums, background vocals
  - Engineered by Roger Moutenot
15. "Blue Lips"
  - Joseph Arthur - vocals, guitars
  - Pat Sansone - bass, electric piano, background vocals
  - Greg Wieczorek - drums
  - Engineered by Mike Napolitano
16. "You've Been Loved"
  - Joseph Arthur - vocals, guitars, pianos
  - Pat Sansone - mellotron
  - Ged Lynch - drums
  - Engineered by Ben Findlay and Tchad Blake
- Sculptures and artwork by Rigby Maricoast.
- Photography and package design by Zachary James Larner.
- Cover photography (US release) by Valdet Demiri.
