= Nuclear Daydream =

Studio album by Joseph Arthur
- Released: September 19, 2006
- Recorded: 2005–2006, Berlin and Los Angeles
- Genre: Alternative rock
- Length: 44:00; 64:56 (with bonus tracks)
- Label: Lonely Astronaut Records
- Producer: Joseph Arthur

Joseph Arthur chronology
The Invisible Parade & We Almost Made It (2006)	Nuclear Daydream (2006)	Let's Just Be (2007)

Alternative cover
- 2009 reissue cover

Professional ratings
Aggregate scores
Source	Rating
Metacritic	81/100
Review scores
Source	Rating
AllMusic	4/5 stars
Alternative Press	4/5 stars
Entertainment Weekly	A−
The Guardian	3/5 stars
musicOMH	4/5 stars
Paste	4.5/5 stars
Pitchfork	6.6/10

Nuclear Daydream is the fifth full-length album by Joseph Arthur, released on September 19, 2006. It was the first release through Joseph's own record label, Lonely Astronaut Records. The album version of "Enough to Get Away" was the first single in the UK to coincide with the album's release there. A music video was produced for "Slide Away," featuring Joseph and his band The Lonely Astronauts.

The album was released to positive reviews. Entertainment Weekly awarded the album 9.1 out of 10 stars, and Allmusic said of the album: "Without it ever deliberately going for the jugular, Nuclear Daydream is nevertheless an album that is difficult to shake out of your ears; moreover, it's one that only grows stronger with every repeated play."

Joseph discussed the making of Nuclear Daydream in an interview with Newsday:

He said the album came together quickly and has a warm, welcoming feel. "I kind of made it that way on purpose," he said. "I was kind of like, 'Let's make something really user-friendly,' not in any sort of sellout way, but just like when I was picking out the songs I was looking for a certain style of song and I thought, 'Let's make a record out of this.' It's the first time I just put the thing together in my head, like I was making a mixtape for a friend."

Nuclear Daydream was reissued in Europe by Fargo Records on October 6, 2009 on CD (in a mini-LP sleeve with lyrics booklet) and double heavyweight vinyl (in a gatefold sleeve). The new edition includes six previously unreleased bonus tracks that were recorded during the album's sessions.

== Track listing ==
All tracks are written by Joseph Arthur.

No.	Title	Length
1.	"Too Much to Hide"	3:18
2.	"Black Lexus"	3:14
3.	"Enough to Get Away"	2:47
4.	"Slide Away"	4:07
5.	"Electrical Storm"	4:50
6.	"You Are Free"	4:15
7.	"Automatic Situation"	3:29
8.	"When I Was Running Out of Time"	3:01
9.	"Don't Tell Your Eyes"	3:13
10.	"Don't Give Up on People"	2:36
11.	"Woman"	4:49
12.	"Nuclear Daydream"	4:20

Side Three: 2009 reissue bonus tracks
No.	Title	Length
13.	"Can't Let You Stay"	3:54
14.	"Moon in the Skull (Long Way Down)"	4:03
15.	"Flashing Lights and Cockfights"	3:35
16.	"My Eyes Follow You"	3:07
17.	"I Love You"	3:39
18.	"Hard to See"	2:39

== Release history ==
Country	Date	Label	Format	Catalogue #
United States	September 19, 2006	Lonely Astronaut Records	CD	LA001
United Kingdom	September 3, 2007	14th Floor Records	CD	5051442 3238 2 5
France	October 6, 2009	Fargo Records	Digital download	
France	October 6, 2009	Fargo Records	CD (reissue)	FR21187
France	November 2, 2009	Fargo Records	Double 12" vinyl	FR21188

== Singles ==
- "Enough to Get Away" (August 27, 2007)

== Album credits ==
- All songs written and produced by Joseph Arthur.
  - Additional production on "Too Much to Hide" by David Kosten.
  - Additional production on "Electrical Storm" and "When I Was Running Out of Time" by Mark Bihler.
  - Additional production on "Nuclear Daydream" by Gary Go and Andreas Wickmann.
1. "Too Much to Hide"
  - Joseph Arthur: guitars, bass, synth and vocals
  - Brian Geltner: drums
  - Mixed by Joseph Arthur, Matt Boynton and David Kosten
  - Additional mixing and synth by David Kosten
  - Recorded by Matt Boynton and Dawn Landes
2. "Black Lexus"
  - Joseph Arthur: all instruments and vocals
  - Recorded and mixed by Joseph Arthur and Mathias Schneeberger
3. "Enough to Get Away"
  - Joseph Arthur: all instruments and vocals
  - Recorded and mixed by Joseph Arthur, Mike Napolitano and Mathias Schneeberger
4. "Slide Away"
  - Joseph Arthur: electric and acoustic guitars, bass, drums, synth, lead and background vocals
  - Kenny Siegal: lead guitar and background vocals
  - Recorded and mixed by Joseph Arthur and Mathias Schneeberger
  - Additional engineering by Mike Napolitano
5. "Electrical Storm"
  - Joseph Arthur: acoustic guitar, bass, theremin and vocals
  - Mark Bihler: Russian synths
  - Gary Go: piano
  - Mixed by Joseph Arthur and Mark Bihler
  - Recorded by Vitaliano Zurlo
6. "You Are Free"
  - Joseph Arthur: acoustic and electric guitars, bass, synth, percussion, lead and background vocals
  - Rene Lopez: drums
  - Joan Wasser: violin
  - Kenny Siegal: background vocals
  - Recorded and mixed by Joseph Arthur and Mathias Schneeberger
  - Additional engineering by Mike Napolitano
7. "Automatic Situation"
  - Joseph Arthur: electric piano, bass, synth, lead and background vocals
  - Sean Porres, a.k.a. "Y": background vocals and sha energy
  - Hoss: drums
  - Recorded by Mathias Schneeberger and "Y"
8. "When I Was Running Out of Time"
  - Joseph Arthur: acoustic guitars and vocals
  - Mixed by Joseph Arthur and Mark Bihler
  - Recorded by Mark Bihler and Vitaliano Zurlo
9. "Don't Tell Your Eyes (Jesus Loves You More Than You Know)"
  - Joseph Arthur: acoustic guitar, drums, piano and vocals
  - Mark Bihler: drum machine and hohner rhythm
  - Mixed by Joseph Arthur and Mark Bihler
  - Recorded by Mark Bihler and Vitaliano Zurlo
10. "Don't Give Up on People"
  - Joseph Arthur: piano, bass, drums, synth and vocals
  - Recorded and mixed by Joseph Arthur
  - Additional engineering by Mike Napolitano
11. "Woman"
  - Joseph Arthur: guitar, drums and vocals
  - Recorded by Joseph Arthur
  - Mixed by Joseph Arthur and Mathias Schneeberger
12. "Nuclear Daydream"
  - Joseph Arthur: acoustic guitar, bass and vocals
  - Gary Go: piano and synth
  - Recorded by Gary Go and Andreas Wickmann
  - Mixed by Joseph Arthur, Gary Go and Andreas Wickmann
13. "Can't Let You Stay"
  - Joseph Arthur: acoustic guitar and vocals
14. "Moon in the Skull (Long Way Down)"
  - Joseph Arthur: guitars, synthesizer, percussion and vocals
  - Greg Wieczorek: drums
15. "Flashing Lights and Cockfights"
  - Joseph Arthur: acoustic guitar, bass and vocals
  - Gary Go: piano
16. "My Eyes Follow You"
  - Joseph Arthur: bass, synthesizer, percussion and vocals
  - Greg Wieczorek: drums
17. "I Love You"
  - Joseph Arthur: all instruments and vocals
18. "Hard to See"
  - Joseph Arthur: all instruments and vocals
- Mastered by Fred Kevorkian at Kevorkian Mastering, Inc.
- Artwork by Davies.
- Photographs by Cerise Leang.
- Design by Davies and Cerise Leang.
- Layout by Cerise Leang, Konsol and Lauren Pattenaude.
