= Sophie B. Hawkins discography =

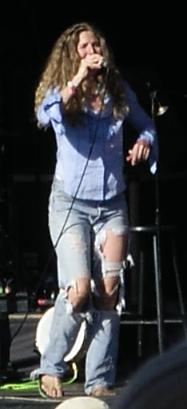
- Cover of the US edition of The Best of Sophie B. Hawkins (US)
- Studio albums: 5
- Live albums: 1
- Compilation albums: 3
- Singles: 17
- Music videos: 17

This is the discography of American rock singer Sophie B. Hawkins.

Hawkins had commercial success throughout the early-to-mid 1990s including her most successful hit singles "Damn I Wish I Was Your Lover", "Right Beside You", and "As I Lay Me Down".

Hawkins's music has not charted since her 1999 album Timbre reached number 87 in Germany.

== Albums ==
=== Studio albums ===
Title	Album details	Peak chart positions										Certifications
Title	Album details	US	AUS	CAN	GER	NED	NZ	NOR	SWE	SWI	UK	Certifications
Tongues and Tails	Released: April 21, 1992; Label: Columbia Records	51	38	20	34	—	—	13	38	15	46	US: Gold; CAN: Gold
Whaler	Released: August 2, 1994; Label: Columbia Records	65	31	45	50	56	13	—	—	43	46	US: Gold; CAN: Gold; NZ: Gold
Timbre	Released: July 20, 1999; Label: Columbia Records	—	232	—	87	—	—	—	—	—	—	
Wilderness	Released: April 20, 2004; Label: Trumpet Swan	—	—	—	—	—	—	—	—	—	—	
The Crossing	Released: June 19, 2012; Label: Rocket Science/Red	—	—	—	—	—	—	—	—	—	—	
Free Myself	Released: March 24, 2023; Label: Lightyear Entertainment	—	—	—	—	—	—	—	—	—	—	
"—" denotes items that did not chart or were not released in that territory.

=== Compilation albums ===
Title	Album details
The Best of Sophie B. Hawkins (European Edition)	Released: October 28, 2002; Label: Columbia Records
The Best of Sophie B. Hawkins (US Edition)	Released: June 10, 2003; Label: Columbia Records
Damn I Wish I Was Your Lover	Released: October 6, 2003; Label: Columbia Records

=== Live albums ===
Title	Album details
Live: Bad Kitty Board Mix	Released: August 22, 2006; Label: Trumpet Swan

== Singles ==
Year	Title	Peak chart positions												Album
Year	Title	US	US AC	AUS	CAN	GER	IRL	NED	NZ	NOR	SWE	SWI	UK	Album
1992	"Damn I Wish I Was Your Lover"	5	39	7	5	15	17	26	4	3	12	11	14	Tongues and Tails
1992	"California Here I Come"	—	—	104	39	77	—	—	43	—	—	—	53	Tongues and Tails
1992	"I Want You"	—	—	200	—	—	—	—	—	—	—	—	49	Tongues and Tails
1994	"Right Beside You"	56	—	41	7	17	30	15	20	—	30	8	13	Whaler
1994	"Don't Don't Tell Me No"	—	—	—	—	69	—	—	—	—	—	—	36	Whaler
1995	"As I Lay Me Down"	6	1	7	6	55	—	—	19	—	—	—	24	Whaler
1995	"Did We Not Choose Each Other"	—	—	—	—	—	—	—	—	—	—	—	—	Whaler
1996	"Only Love (The Ballad of Sleeping Beauty)"	49	22	114	7	—	—	—	—	—	—	—	—	Whaler
1999	"Lose Your Way"	—	26	—	—	—	—	—	—	—	—	—	—	Timbre
2001	"Walking in My Blue Jeans"	—	23	—	—	—	—	—	—	—	—	—	—	Timbre
2004	"Beautiful Girl"	—	—	—	—	—	—	—	—	—	—	—	—	Wilderness
2004	"—" denotes items that did not chart or were not released in that territory.													
