= The Best of Sophie B. Hawkins =

The Best of Sophie B. Hawkins is the name of two compilation albums by American singer Sophie B. Hawkins.

== 2002 ==
If I Was Your Girl: The Best of Sophie B. Hawkins

Greatest hits album by Sophie B. Hawkins
- Released: October 28, 2002
- Recorded: 1991–2002
- Genre: Adult contemporary
- Length: 67:04
- Label: Columbia
- Producers: Rick Chertoff; Ralph Schuckett; Stephen Lipson

Sophie B. Hawkins chronology
Timbre (1999)	If I Was Your Girl: The Best of Sophie B. Hawkins (2002)	Wilderness (2004)

If I Was Your Girl: The Best of Sophie B. Hawkins was her first compilation album, and was released 10 years after her first studio album, Tongues and Tails. It contains no songs from what was then her most recent album, Timbre, released in 1999; instead, besides Hawkins' main singles (barring those from Timbre), it contains a variety of tracks from her first two albums that were not issued as singles, ending with an exclusive cover of "The Night They Drove Old Dixie Down", originally by the Band. The album was only released internationally, and not in Hawkins' home country of the United States. An album called simply The Best of Sophie B. Hawkins, also released as Essential Sophie B. Hawkins, was issued the following year there.

=== Track listing ===
All songs written by Sophie B. Hawkins, except where noted.

1. "Damn I Wish I Was Your Lover" – 5:25
2. "Right Beside You" (Chertoff, Hawkins, Lerman) – 4:47
3. "As I Lay Me Down" – 4:10
4. "Don't Don't Tell Me No" – 4:53
5. "California Here I Come" – 4:36
6. "Before I Walk on Fire" – 4:59
7. "We Are One Body" – 4:49
8. "I Want You" (Bob Dylan) – 5:18
9. "Don't Stop Swaying" – 5:28
10. "Only Love (The Ballad of Sleeping Beauty)" – 5:03
11. "I Need Nothing Else" – 4:16
12. "Did We Not Choose Each Other" – 4:26
13. "Let Me Love You Up" – 3:26
14. "The Night They Drove Old Dixie Down" (Robbie Robertson) – 5:28

== 2003 ==
The Best of Sophie B. Hawkins (US Edition)

Greatest hits album by Sophie B. Hawkins
- Released: June 10, 2003
- Recorded: 1991–1995
- Genre: Adult contemporary
- Length: 66:52
- Label: Columbia
- Producer: Stephen Lipson

Sophie B. Hawkins chronology
The Best of Sophie B. Hawkins (European Edition) (2002)	The Best of Sophie B. Hawkins (US Edition) (2003)	Wilderness (2004)

The Best of Sophie B. Hawkins is a 2003 compilation album by Sophie B. Hawkins. It was released exclusively in the United States, and contains much of the same tracks as the previous year's compilation of the same name, which was released internationally. Instead, this album replaces single "Don't Don't Tell Me No", "Let Me Love You Up" and "We Are One Body" from the previous album for Whaler track "Swing from Limb to Limb (My Home Is in Your Jungle)", the Butcher mix of "As I Lay Me Down" and another single from Tongues and Tails, "Mysteries We Understand". This album has also been issued with the title Essential Sophie B. Hawkins.

The album was followed by yet another compilation, strangely released within the same year and titled after Hawkins' first single, "Damn I Wish I Was Your Lover". It collects tracks from the singer's first two albums.

=== Track listing ===
All songs written by Sophie B. Hawkins, except where noted.

1. "Damn I Wish I Was Your Lover" – 5:25
2. "California Here I Come" – 4:36
3. "Mysteries We Understand" – 4:48
4. "Before I Walk on Fire" – 4:59
5. "Don't Stop Swaying" – 5:28
6. "I Want You" (Bob Dylan) – 5:18
7. "Right Beside You" (Chertoff, Hawkins, Lerman) – 4:47
8. "As I Lay Me Down" – 4:10
9. "Did We Not Choose Each Other" – 4:26
10. "Only Love (The Ballad of Sleeping Beauty)" – 5:04
11. "I Need Nothing Else" – 4:16
12. "The Night They Drove Old Dixie Down" (Robbie Robertson) – 5:28
13. "Swing from Limb to Limb (My Home Is in Your Jungle)" – 4:15
14. "As I Lay Me Down" (Butcher Mix) – 3:52
