= The Crossing (Sophie B. Hawkins album) =

2012 studio album by Sophie B. Hawkins

Studio album by Sophie B. Hawkins
- Released: June 19, 2012
- Genre: Pop rock
- Length: 68:12
- Language: English
- Labels: Lightyear Entertainment; Trumpet Swan Records
- Producers: Alexandria Dobson; Larrance Dopson; Sophie B. Hawkins

Sophie B. Hawkins chronology
Live: Bad Kitty Board Mix (2006)	The Crossing (2012)	Free Myself (2023)

The Crossing is a 2012 studio album by American singer Sophie B. Hawkins.

== Reception ==
Jon O'Brien of AllMusic gave the album a mixed review with the site editors giving it three of five stars. He praised the album's diverse songwriting but criticizes the release for losing its way and ultimately being "just too ordinary to be the career-reviver she needs".

== Track listing ==
All tracks are written by Sophie B. Hawkins, except "Sinnerman" (Les Baxter, Will Holt).

No.	Title	Length
1.	"Betchya Gotta Cure"	3:21
2.	"Sinnerman" (Les Baxter cover)	3:03
3.	"The Land the Sea and the Sky"	4:15
4.	"Georgia"	3:58
5.	"Missing"	3:06
6.	"Heart & Soul of a Woman"	4:02
7.	"Life Is a River"	4:40
8.	"I Don't Need You"	3:00
9.	"Miles Away"	5:26
10.	"Gone Baby"	6:00
11.	"A Child"	3:51
12.	"Dream St & Chance"	3:47
13.	"Red Bird"	4:34
14.	"Betchya Gotta Cure" (Long)	4:13
15.	"Damn I Wish I Was Your Lover" (Acoustic)	4:40
16.	"As I Lay Me Down" (Acoustic)	3:26
17.	"Missing" (Original Demo)	3:30
Total length:		68:12

== Personnel ==
- Sophie B. Hawkins – arrangement, drums, engineering, percussion, piano, production, strings, vocals

Additional musicians

- Jimmy Paxson – drums
- Paul Pesco – guitar
- Tim Pierce – guitar
- David Piltch – bass guitar
- Kaveh Rastegar – bass guitar
- Ed Roth – piano
- Mary Steenburgen – composer
- Lee Thornburg – horn, horn arrangement
- Graham Ward – drums
- Tim Young – guitar

Technical personnel

- Mark DeSisto – mixing
- Alexandria Dobson – vocal production
- Larrance Dopson – production
- Kevin Killen – mixing
