= Darren Gaines & The Key Party =

Darren Gaines & The Key Party is an American seven piece subversive lounge act from New York City. The band was started by Darren Gaines in 2006.

The self-released debut, Hit or Miss, came out in late 2006. It was named Album of the Day by CMJ, Download of the Week in the San Francisco Chronicle, and dubbed "15 songs of rock and roll poetry celebrating the debauched, the broken, the drunken and the misfitting", by PopMatters. They have been compared to Nick Cave, Tom Waits and Lou Reed.

In an interview on Polskie Radio 910AM New York (July 11, 2007), Gaines said The Key Party name came from the scene in The Ice Storm where Sigorney Weaver reaches her hand into the fish bowl and pulls out the young man's keys. The scene inspired Gaines to "use a similar lottery-like system... He invited a bunch of musician friends into the studio and had them select from a variety of instruments - everything from traditional music-making devices, such as guitars and drums, to kitchen spoons and children's toys - by randomly pulling a piece of paper with the instrument's name on it from a bowl".

In 2008, Darren Gaines & The Key Party recorded their follow-up CD, My Blacks Don't Match, produced by Ken Rich. My Blacks Don't Match was released in February 2009.
