= Walking in My Blue Jeans =

Single by Sophie B. Hawkins

from the album Timbre
- Released: 2001
- Length: 3:53 (album version); 2:52 (radio edit)
- Label: Rykodisc
- Songwriter: Sophie B. Hawkins
- Producer: Sophie B. Hawkins

Sophie B. Hawkins singles chronology
| "Lose Your Way" (1999) | "Walking in My Blue Jeans" (2001) | "Beautiful Girl" (2004) |

Music video
- "Walking in My Blue Jeans" on YouTube

"Walking in My Blue Jeans" is a song by American singer-songwriter Sophie B. Hawkins, released in 2001 as the second and final single from her third studio album, Timbre. The song was written and produced by Hawkins. "Walking in My Blue Jeans" peaked at number 23 on the US Billboard Adult Contemporary chart.

== Background ==
"Walking in My Blue Jeans" originally appeared as "Strange Thing", the opening track on Hawkins' third album Timbre, which was released by Columbia in 1999. At the time, Hawkins' relationship with the label was strained due to disagreements over her musical direction and image. When the album and its promotional single "Lose Your Way" failed to meet commercial expectations, Hawkins left Columbia in 2000. After buying back the rights to the album, she had Timbre re-released independently on her own Trumpet Swan Records, with distribution through Rykodisc, in 2001. To promote the re-release, "Walking in My Blue Jeans" was issued as a promotional single. The song was also used that year by Calvin Klein to promote its latest line of women's jeans.

Speaking to the Gavin Report in 2001, Hawkins said of the song,

"Musically, it reminds me of waking up on Saturday morning as a kid in New York. [Lyrically], it's about realizing you're so much different than you thought you were, and being OK with it - realizing you're not the kid you used to be." In regards to the reference to blue jeans, Hawkins said, "You can go anywhere and do anything in them. In blue jeans, we're closest to being ourselves. And everyone looks good in blue jeans, you know."

== Critical reception ==
In a review of the original release of Timbre, Sandra Sperounes of The Edmonton Journal described the song as a "mid-tempo number featuring Hawkins' yearning voice, ghostly xylophones, and a lonely guitar riff". In her review of the 2001 re-release of Timbre, Kim Curtis of the Associated Press wrote, "With its infectious optimism and catchy kettle drum chorus, the song is poised to become Hawkins' latest hit." When the song was released as a single, Todd Spencer of the Gavin Report described "Walking in My Blue Jeans" as a "made-for-summer record, with a languid melody and a breezy, open-tuned marimba that gives it a stone-washed 'relaxed fit' on Mainstream A/Cs across the country."

== Track listing ==
CD single (US promo)

1. "Walking in My Blue Jeans" – 3:53
2. "Lose Your Way" – 4:03

CD single (European promo)

1. "Walking in My Blue Jeans" (Radio Edit) – 2:52

== Personnel ==
Production

- Sophie B. Hawkins – producer, engineer
- Kevin Killen – mixing, engineer
- Chris Fuderich, Al Sanderson – assistant engineers
- Bob Ludwig – mastering

Other

- Gigi Gaston – photography

== Charts ==
| Chart (2001) | Peak position |
|---|---|
| US Adult Contemporary (Billboard) | 23 |
