= All Time Greatest Movie Songs =

Compilation album by Various Artists
- Released: March 16, 1999
- Genre: Soundtrack
- Label: Columbia

All Time Greatest Movie Songs is a joint effort with Columbia Records of Sony Music UK to release movie compilations in 1999. Most of the soundtrack songs are throughout the 90s with the exception of "Modern Woman" by Billy Joel, which was released in the 80s.

== Track listing ==
No.	Title	Writer(s)	Artist(s)	Length
1.	"My Heart Will Go On (Love Theme from "Titanic")" (from Titanic, 1997)	James Horner; Will Jennings	Céline Dion	4:42
2.	"Men in Black" (from Men in Black, 1997)	Will Smith; Patrice Rushen; Terri McFaddin; Freddie Washington	Will Smith	3:46
3.	"The Sweetest Thing" (from Love Jones, 1997)	Lauryn Hill; Wyclef Jean	Lauren Hill (with Refugee Camp All-Stars)	4:51
4.	"I Say a Little Prayer (Love to Infinity's Classic Radio Mix)" (from My Best Friend's Wedding, 1997)	Burt Bacharach; Hal David	Diana King	3:29
5.	"Streets of Philadelphia" (from Philadelphia, 1993)	Bruce Springsteen	Bruce Springsteen	3:51
6.	"As I Lay Me Down" (from Now and Then, 1995)	Sophie B. Hawkins	Sophie B. Hawkins	4:10
7.	"Go the Distance" (from Hercules, 1997)	Alan Menken; David Zippel	Michael Bolton	4:42
8.	"Heaven's What I Feel (Dance Remix)" (from Dance with Me, 1998)	Kike Santander	Gloria Estefan	5:08
9.	"A Whole New World (Aladdin's Theme)" (from Aladdin, 1992)	Menken; Tim Rice	Peabo Bryson; Regina Belle	4:07
10.	"For the First Time" (from One Fine Day, 1996)	James Newton Howard; Jud J. Friedman; Allan Dennis Rich	Kenny Loggins	4:29
11.	"I Want to Spend My Lifetime Loving You" (from The Mask of Zorro, 1998)	Horner; Jennings	Marc Anthony; Tina Arena	4:43
12.	"I Finally Found Someone" (from The Mirror Has Two Faces, 1996)	Barbra Streisand; Bryan Adams; Marvin Hamlisch; Robert John "Mutt" Lange	Barbra Streisand; Bryan Adams	3:44
13.	"Modern Woman" (from Ruthless People, 1986)	Billy Joel	Billy Joel	3:50
14.	"You Were There" (from Simon Birch, 1998)	Kenneth Brian Edmonds	Babyface	4:57
15.	"Will You Be There (Theme from "Free Willy")" (from Free Willy, 1993)	Michael Jackson	Michael Jackson	5:54
16.	"I'm Kissing You" (from William Shakespeare's Romeo + Juliet, 1996)	Desirée Annette Weekes; Timothy Atack	Des'ree	4:52
17.	"Heart of a Hero" (from Hero, 1992)	Luther Vandross	Luther Vandross	3:25
Total length:				1:14:30

== Certifications ==
Region	Certification	Certified units/sales
United States (RIAA)	Gold	500,000^{^}
^{^} Shipments figures based on certification alone.
