= Devil's Broom =

2006 single by Joseph Arthur

Single by Joseph Arthur

from the album Our Shadows Will Remain
- Released: February 6, 2006 (digital); February 13, 2006 (CD/7")
- Recorded: 2004
- Genre: Alternative rock
- Length: 3:41 (radio edit); 4:46 (album version)
- Label: 14th Floor Records
- Songwriter: Joseph Arthur
- Producers: Joseph Arthur, Ken Rich

Joseph Arthur singles chronology
"Even Tho" (2005)	"Devil's Broom" (2006)	"Can't Exist" (2006)

Music video
- "Devil's Broom" on YouTube

"Devil's Broom" is the third single from Joseph Arthur's fourth studio album Our Shadows Will Remain. The single was released on February 13, 2006, in the UK to coincide with his live dates at Shepherd's Bush Empire. It was released on CD and 7" as well as digital download bundles. The CD single's B-side, "Papa", is Joseph's touching ode to his father. He played the song live as early as 1998.

In a positive review for AngryApe, David Adair wrote, "'Devil's Broom' represents another stroke of understated genius from the musical palette of Arthur. Mundane and emotive Morrissey styled lyricism and projected singing with a speckle of the troubled cry of Jeff Buckley, is propped up by a wandering accompaniment that Echo & the Bunnymen used to such startling effect."

A video for the song was produced, directed by Noaz Deshe. It shows Joseph being dragged through a city interspersed with footage of a female lover he longs to be near.

== Track listing ==
CD (JA04CD):

1. "Devil's Broom" (Edit) – 3:41
2. "Papa" – 4:56

7" (white vinyl, JA04V):

1. "Devil's Broom" (Edit) – 3:41
2. "There Is a Light That Never Goes Out" (Live at the Scala) – 5:17

Digital downloads: (available separately on iTunes UK only)

1. "Devil's Broom" (Edit) – 3:41
2. "Devil's Broom" (Live at the Scala) – 5:59
3. "Devil's Broom" (Acoustic) – 4:23
4. "There Is a Light That Never Goes Out" (Live at the Scala) – 5:17
- All songs written by Joseph Arthur, except "There Is a Light That Never Goes Out" written by Steven Morrissey and Johnny Marr.
- "Devil's Broom" produced by Joseph Arthur and Ken Rich.
- "Papa" produced by Joseph Arthur, Rick Will, and T-Bone Burnett.
- "There Is a Light That Never Goes Out" and "Devil's Broom" recorded live at the Scala, October 5, 2005. Recorded and mixed by Graham Pattison.
