= As I Lay Me Down =

Single by Sophie B. Hawkins

Single by Sophie B. Hawkins

from the album Whaler
- B-side: "I Need Nothing Else"
- Released: February 7, 1995
- Genre: Synth-pop
- Length: 4:11
- Label: Columbia
- Songwriter: Sophie B. Hawkins
- Producer: Stephen Lipson

Sophie B. Hawkins singles chronology
"Don't Don't Tell Me No" (1994)	"As I Lay Me Down" (1995)	"Did We Not Choose Each Other" (1995)

Music video
- "As I Lay Me Down" on YouTube

External audio
- As I Lay Me Down
- "As I Lay Me Down", from The Official Website for Sophie B. Hawkins, retrieved 20180825.

"As I Lay Me Down" is a song written and performed by American singer-songwriter Sophie B. Hawkins. It was released in February 1995 by Columbia Records as the third single from her second album, Whaler (1994), and also appears on The Best of Sophie B. Hawkins (2002). The song, a tribute to her father, is produced by Stephen Lipson and remains one of her two biggest hits, reaching number six on the US Billboard Hot 100 and number one on the Billboard Adult Contemporary chart for six weeks in 1995. Outside the United States, the song reached number three in Israel, number six in Canada, number seven in Australia, number 19 in New Zealand, and number 24 in the United Kingdom. Its music video was directed by Ernie Fritz and filmed in New York City.

== Release ==
"As I Lay Me Down" was initially intended for Hawkins' debut album Tongues and Tails, but was excluded after objections from the record label. The song is a pop ballad in which the singer reminisces about a faraway loved one as she goes to bed and hopes to see him again. It was written in memory of her father. It was the second US single released from the album Whaler. With disappointing sales of the first single, "Right Beside You", the song was released with little fanfare (a photograph of Sophie dressed as a sailor was the focus of the cover). Sophie then insisted that her label (Columbia) allow her to tour the country with only an acoustic piano. The song then began receiving airplay on adult contemporary stations. During mid-1995, it became an adult contemporary hit as well as a top-10 single in the United States. A remix also helped the song gain airplay on other kinds of stations. It was also included on the album All Time Greatest Movie Songs, released by Columbia Records in 1999.

== Critical reception ==
Steve Baltin from Cash Box named "As I Lay Me Down" Pick of the Week, describing it as "a lovely song, gentle as its title indicates. The keyboard music that drives the song behind Hawkins' vocals calls to mind the Police's 'Every Little Thing She Does Is Magic'." He wrote further that it's "a refreshing change of pace for the singer-songwriter, who has not received the same attention for this album as for her first simply because she doesn't fit neatly into any category. While this single doesn't necessarily change that, its easygoing and lighthearted charm may help Hawkins to reepature [sic] some of the magic as A/C [sic] and Top 40 should have a place for this one." Peter Galvin from Entertainment Weekly gave the song an A− rating, stating that the synth-pop hymn "has resuscitated her career. A tribute to her father, the song has a lovely, lulling melody that more than compensates for Hawkins’ shallow vocals."

Fell and Rufer from the Gavin Report concluded, "Here's the track that will make Hawkins a definitive A/C artist. It may be easy on the ear, and the sentiment is wistful and hopeful. Should do well and play forever at A/C." Chuck Campbell from Knoxville News Sentinel said that listeners "might get a sugar high off" of the "saccharine" 'As I Lay Me Down'. In his weekly UK chart commentary, James Masterton felt it's "the kind of gentle ballad that is either best appreciated first thing in the morning or at the end of a long tired day. If nothing else in the chart deserves to go Top 20 – this certainly does." Pan-European magazine Music & Media wrote, "A re-release of 'Right Beside You' finally gave Hawkins the hit she was rightly entitled to. Prepare yourselves for the next one from the jukebox-of-future-pop-smashes Whaler."

== Music video ==
The accompanying music video for "As I Lay Me Down" was directed by Ernie Fritz for Automatic Films. Ellen Kuras directed photography and Mike Alfieri produced. It depicts Hawkins singing while sitting on stairs outside an apartment building in her hometown of New York City. It flashes to Hawkins in a forest swinging on a swing, lying on a tree branch, sitting in a boat, and sitting on a bench. It also shows a little girl running through the forest representing Hawkins as a child.

== Track listings ==
- US CD and cassette single
1. "As I Lay Me Down"
2. "I Need Nothing Else"
- UK CD1
1. "As I Lay Me Down"
2. "Miles Away" (demo version)
3. "Damn I Wish I Was Your Lover" (live version)
4. "True Romance"
- UK CD2
1. "As I Lay Me Down"
2. "Before I Walk on Fire" (live version)
3. "Right Beside You" (demo version)
4. "True Romance"
- UK cassette single and European CD single
1. "As I Lay Me Down" – 4:09
2. "True Romance" – 2:23
- Australian CD single
1. "As I Lay Me Down"
2. "Before I Walk on Fire" (live version)
3. "Right Beside You" (demo version)
4. "Damn I Wish I Was Your Lover" (live version)

== Charts ==
=== Weekly charts ===
Chart (1995–1996)	Peak position
Australia (ARIA)	7
Canada Top Singles (RPM)	6
Canada Adult Contemporary (RPM)	3
Europe (Eurochart Hot 100)	58
Europe (European Hit Radio)	16
Germany (GfK)	55
Iceland (Íslenski Listinn Topp 40)	16
Israel (Israeli Singles Chart)	3
New Zealand (Recorded Music NZ)	19
Scottish Singles Sales (Official Charts)	25
UK Singles (Official Charts)	24
US Billboard Hot 100	6
US Adult Contemporary (Billboard)	1
US Adult Pop Airplay (Billboard)	1
US Pop Airplay (Billboard)	3
US Cash Box Top 100	4

=== Year-end charts ===
Chart (1995)	Position
Australia (ARIA)	46
Canada Top Singles (RPM)	85
Canada Adult Contemporary (RPM)	55
US Billboard Hot 100	39
US Adult Contemporary (Billboard)	13
US Top 40/Mainstream (Billboard)	28
US Cash Box Top 100	41

Chart (1996)	Position
US Billboard Hot 100	76
US Adult Contemporary (Billboard)	5
US Adult Top 40 (Billboard)	28
US Top 40/Mainstream (Billboard)	50

== Certifications ==
Region	Certification	Certified units/sales
Australia (ARIA)	Gold	35,000^{^}
^{^} Shipments figures based on certification alone.

== Release history ==
Region	Date	Format(s)	Label(s)	Ref.
United States	February 7, 1995	CD	Columbia	
United Kingdom	February 27, 1995	CD; cassette	Columbia	
United States	April 18, 1995	Contemporary hit radio	Columbia	
Australia	September 4, 1995	CD; cassette	Columbia	

== Usage in media ==
It appeared in Now and Then and the TV series Party of Five (with Hawkins performing it as a guest star) in 1995 and the 1998 pilot of Dawson's Creek. The song also was played in Season 2/Episode 18 of Cold Case.

Hawkins also performed the songs "Damn I Wish I Was Your Lover" and "As I Lay Me Down" in the season 4 episode 8 "Herstory of Dance" of the television show Community. In the episode, Britta organizes a "Sophie B. Hawkins" dance in protest to Greendale's "Sadie Hawkins" dance. It also appeared in the original episode 4 of the webseries The Gay and Wondrous Life of Caleb Gallo.
