= Lose Your Way (song) =

Single by Sophie B. Hawkins

from the album Timbre
- Released: 1999
- Length: 4:03
- Label: Columbia
- Songwriter: Sophie B. Hawkins
- Producer: Sophie B. Hawkins

Sophie B. Hawkins singles chronology
"Only Love (The Ballad of Sleeping Beauty)" (1996)	"Lose Your Way" (1999)	"Walking in My Blue Jeans" (2001)

"Lose Your Way" is a song by American singer-songwriter Sophie B. Hawkins, which was released in 1999 as the sole single from her third studio album Timbre. The song was written and produced by Hawkins. "Lose Your Way" peaked at No. 26 on the US Billboard Adult Contemporary chart.

Shortly prior to its release as a single and on Timbre, "Lose Your Way" was featured in a 1999 episode of the American teen drama television series Dawson's Creek and was included on the show's first soundtrack album Songs from Dawson's Creek. In 2000, it was featured in the American romantic drama film Bounce and included on its soundtrack release.

== Background ==
Despite its release in 1999, Hawkins' third album Timbre was completed for an expected release during 1996. On hearing Hawkins' new material, which she produced herself, Columbia disapproved of the album's musical direction and also felt Hawkins needed a new image. Wishing to maintain her artistic integrity, a lengthy battle between Hawkins and Columbia followed. Columbia had initially picked "No Connection" to be the album's single, but this was later changed to "Lose Your Way". Although the label requested the song's banjo be replaced, Hawkins refused. She told Billboard in 1999: "I put banjo on that song because that's what I heard, and I am the songwriter, right? Without the banjo, it sounded like Muzak."

In response to Columbia's pressure, Hawkins had "Lose Your Way" played during a radio interview in Florida. Listener reception was positive and a subsequent internet campaign saw 200,000 emails sent to Sony Music (Columbia's parent company) in support of the artist. The company then agreed to give Hawkins control over her musical direction and Timbre was released in 1999, with "Lose Your Way" as a promotional single. After Timbre saw limited commercial success, Hawkins left Columbia in 2000 and had the album re-released independently (with distribution by Rykodisc) in 2001.

== Critical reception ==
On its release, Chuck Taylor of Billboard described "Lose Your Way" as a "lovely, folk-rinsed track" with an "exquisitely written lyric that vows lifetime of love". He noted Hawkins' "gentle, ambling vocal" and the use of "quirky banjo". In a review of Timbre, Sandra Sperounes of the Edmonton Journal considered the song a "lovely, bittersweet ballad" and added: "Banjo isn't known for being the most delicate of instruments, but [here] it gracefully mingles with a tinkling piano and Hawkins' quavering voice."

== Track listing ==
CD single (US promo)

1. "Lose Your Way" - 4:03

== Personnel ==
Production

- Sophie B. Hawkins - producer, engineer
- Kevin Killen - mixing, engineer
- Mark Endert - additional engineer
- Chris Fuderich, Al Sanderson - assistant engineers
- Bob Ludwig - mastering

== Charts ==
Chart (1999)	Peak position
US Adult Contemporary (Billboard)	26
