= Can't Exist =

Single by Joseph Arthur

from the album Our Shadows Will Remain
- Released: July 4, 2005; May 1, 2006 (re-issue)
- Recorded: 2004
- Genre: Alternative rock
- Length: 4:00 (radio edit); 4:08 (album version)
- Label: 14th Floor Records
- Songwriter: Joseph Arthur
- Producers: Joseph Arthur, Mike Napolitano

Joseph Arthur singles chronology
"All of Our Hands" (2005)	"Can't Exist" (2005)	"Even Tho" (2005)

Joseph Arthur singles chronology
"Devil's Broom" (2006)	"Can't Exist" (2006)	"Honey and the Moon" (2007)

"Can't Exist" is a single taken from Joseph Arthur's fourth studio album Our Shadows Will Remain. Initially, it was the first single in the UK, released on CD and white-colored 7" vinyl on July 4, 2005. Then, it was re-issued as the fourth single from the album on 3-part 7" vinyl, released on May 1, 2006.

A music video was produced for the song, directed by Noaz Deshe. It features Joseph in various locations in New Orleans, where much of Our Shadows Will Remain was recorded.

== Track listings ==
=== 2005 singles ===
CD & 7" (JA02CD & JA02V, white-colored vinyl):

1. "Can't Exist" – 4:08
2. "Real as Rain" – 5:10

=== 2006 re-issue singles ===
7" vinyl #1 (clear vinyl, JA05V1):

1. "Can't Exist" (Edit) – 4:00
2. "Can't Exist" (Remarkables Remix) – 4:13

7" vinyl #2 (white vinyl, JA05V2):

1. "Can't Exist" (Acoustic) – 3:18
2. "More to Give" (featuring Julia Darling) – 4:26

7" vinyl #3 (orange vinyl, JA05V3):

1. "Can't Exist" (Live at Shepherd's Bush Empire) – 6:24 (plays at 33 RPM)
2. "Jump Out Boy" – 2:30 (plays at 45 RPM)

== Notes ==
- All songs written by Joseph Arthur, except "Jump Out Boy" written by Joseph Arthur and James Hall.
- "Can't Exist" produced by Joseph Arthur and Mike Napolitano.
- "Real as Rain" produced by Joseph Arthur, Rick Will, and T-Bone Burnett.
- The Remarkables remix by Christopher Tubbs and Brad Ellis.
- "Can't Exist" acoustic produced by Jon Brion.
- "More to Give" produced by Joseph Arthur.
- "Can't Exist" recorded live at Shepherd's Bush Empire, February 24, 2006. Recorded and mixed by Graham Pattison.
- "Jump Out Boy" produced by Joseph Arthur and James Hall.
