= Free Myself =

Studio album by Sophie B. Hawkins
- Released: March 24, 2023
- Studios: Grand Street Recording in Brooklyn, New York City, United States
- Length: 38:43
- Language: English
- Label: Lightyear Entertainment
- Producers: Sophie B. Hawkins; Ken Rich

Sophie B. Hawkins chronology
The Crossing (2012)	Free Myself (2023)

It feels like the title of the album. I'm freeing myself, allowing myself to get this work out there. It's being very well received, and I'm grateful for it.

— Hawkins on releasing new music for the first time in over a decade.

Free Myself is a 2023 studio album by American singer-songwriter Sophie B. Hawkins. The album explores themes of personal fulfillment and exploration and is Hawkins' first new music in over 10 years and was accompanied by a promotional tour. Although she spent several years away from recording, Hawkins continued to write and did not want to release new music until she felt like she had a sufficiently strong collection of songs. These tracks were written prior to the COVID-19 pandemic, demoed, and brought to Ken Rich to finish, with Hawkins co-producing the album.

== Reception ==
Writing for Renowned for Sound, Matt Say calls this album "is a triumphant example of some of her best work yet" and "a brilliant addition to the rich back catalogue that Sophie B. Hawkins has created in her storied career". Writing for Patch.com, Tony Schinella writes that the album was "eloquently engineered and produced by Ken Rich" and "the songs often offer fragility and beauty, highlighting Hawkins' strong vocals and musicianship and lyrical love twists".

== Track listing ==
All tracks are written by Sophie B. Hawkins, except "Green Eyes" (lyrics by Hawkins; music by Hawkins, Will Knox) and "Fairy Tales" (Hawkins, Per Kristian Ottestad).

No.	Title	Length
1.	"Love Yourself"	3:43
2.	"Better Off Without You"	4:11
3.	"Green Eyes"	4:06
4.	"Free Myself"	4:32
5.	"Consume Me in Your Fire" (Demo)	3:00
6.	"Hungered for Love"	3:35
7.	"Fairy Tales"	3:39
8.	"Angel in Disguise"	3:29
9.	"I'm Tired of Taking Care of You"	4:33
10.	"You Are My Balloon"	3:55
Total length:		38:43

== Personnel ==
Credits are adapted from the album's liner notes.

=== Musicians ===
- Sophie B. Hawkins – lead vocals, backing vocals, acoustic piano, acoustic guitar, percussion
- Andrew Sherman – acoustic piano, Rhodes electric piano, Wurlitzer electric piano, Hammond B3 organ, synthesizers, melodica, vibraphone, glockenspiel, marxophone
- John Andrews – steel-string acoustic guitar, electric guitar, nylon guitar
- Peter Calo – acoustic guitar, electric guitar, dobro
- Will Knox – acoustic guitar
- Ken Rich – baritone guitar, bass, percussion
- Tony Mason – drums, percussion
- Mathias Kunzli – percussion
- Chris Eminizer – baritone saxophone, bass clarinet, clarinet, tenor saxophone, woodwind arrangements
- Clark Gayton – trombone
- Eddie Allen – trumpet

String section

- Sophie B. Hawkins – string arrangements
- Andrew Sherman – string arrangements
- Emily Brausa – cello
- Ann Kim – cello
- Anja Wood – cello
- Chris Cardona – viola, violin
- Dave Creswell – viola, violin
- Jonathan Dinklage – viola, violin
- Lisa Matricardi – viola
- Antoine Silverman – viola, violin
- Entcho Todorov – viola, violin
- Sylvia D'Avanzo – violin
- Max Moston – violin

=== Production ===
- Sophie B. Hawkins – producer
- Ken Rich – producer, recording, mixing (2–10)
- Andrew Oedel – mixing (1)
- Jake Lummus – assistant engineer
- Fred Kevorkian – mastering
- Val Shaff – front cover photography
- Mark Andrews – back cover photography
- Merryn Johns – inside cover photography
- Gina R. Binkley – design
- Ron Stone for Gold Mountain Entertainment – management

== See also ==
- List of 2023 albums
