= Teddy Getty Gaston =

American author and singer

- Born: Louise Dudley Theodora Lynch; September 13, 1913; Chicago, Illinois
- Died: April 8, 2017 (aged 103); Malibu, California
- Spouses: J. Paul Getty (m. 1939; div. 1958): William Gaston
- Children: Timmy Getty; Louise Gigi Gaston

Teddy Getty Gaston (September 13, 1913 – April 8, 2017) (born Louise Dudley Theodora Lynch, also known as Teddy Lynch and Theodora Getty) was an American author and singer. She was the fifth and last wife of oil tycoon J. Paul Getty.

== Early life ==
Lynch was born in Chicago, Illinois, in 1913. She was raised in Greenwich, Connecticut. She moved to New York City to become a singer and worked at a supper club for $25 a week.

Gaston is a Harcum College, Alumna, 1929.

== Life with John Paul Getty ==
While singing at a nightclub in New York in 1935, Lynch met J. Paul Getty, and the two started dating. Lynch wanted to be an opera singer and Getty paid for her lessons. The couple married in Rome, Italy, in 1939.

Lynch went to England and Italy to study opera and she worked as a journalist for the New York Herald Tribune. On the dawn of World War II, Lynch was arrested and held by the Italian Fascist Party and was accused of being a spy. She was freed and moved back to the United States in 1942. Getty was living in Oklahoma and Lynch chose to reside in Santa Monica, California. Lynch had a son with Getty named Timmy, who died aged 12 of a brain tumor. Getty was overseas when Timmy died and remained there when the boy was buried at the family's home, now the Getty Villa.

Lynch and Getty divorced in 1958. Lynch was Getty's longest marriage and last wife before his death in 1976.

== Marriage to William Gaston and life after Getty ==
She married her friend William Gaston. She had a daughter with Gaston, Louise Gigi Gaston.

Gaston performed as an opera singer in the Billy Wilder film The Lost Weekend. She published a novel called The Mark of an Eagle in 1990.

== Late life and death ==
In 2013, her 100th year, she published a memoir titled Alone Together: My Life with J. Paul Getty. Gaston resided in Malibu, California. She died on April 8, 2017.

== Works ==
- Gaston, Teddy Getty and Robert Jackson Hill. The Mark of the Eagle. Xlibris Corp: Bloomington (2002). ISBN 0738838225
- Gaston, Teddy Getty. Alone Together: My Life with J. Paul Getty. Ecco: New York (2013). ISBN 0062219715
