= Don't Don't Tell Me No =

1994 single by Sophie B. Hawkins

Single by Sophie B. Hawkins

from the album Whaler
- B-side: "Big Beautiful Bottom in My Face"; "Swing from Limb to Limb (My Home Is Your Jungle)"
- Released: November 14, 1994
- Genre: Pop
- Length: 4:52 (album version); 3:59 (single version)
- Label: Columbia
- Songwriter: Sophie B. Hawkins
- Producer: Stephen Lipson

Sophie B. Hawkins singles chronology
"Right Beside You" (1994)	"Don't Don't Tell Me No" (1994)	"As I Lay Me Down" (1995)

"Don't Don't Tell Me No" is a song by American singer-songwriter Sophie B. Hawkins, released in November 1994 by Columbia Records as the second single from her second studio album, Whaler (1994). The song was written by Hawkins and produced by Stephen Lipson. "Don't Don't Tell Me No" peaked at No. 36 on the UK Singles Chart and remained in the top 100 for five weeks.

== Critical reception ==
Upon its release as a single, Music & Media wrote, "Like the wind blows the leaves off the trees, Hawkins constantly pulls pop songs out of her bag." Barbara Ellen of NME stated, "Despite harbouring some of the worst lyrics ever, [this] is a groovy, clever pop ballad, the sort of thing Kylie might have ended up doing if she'd slept with Neil Finn instead of Michael Hutchence." In a review of Whaler, Jim Farber of The Daily News said, "Tracks like 'Right Beside You' and 'Don't Don't Tell Me No' chirp happily along with coquettish flair and great hook appeal." Jonathan Bernstein from Spin described it as "starry-eyed" and "delirious" with its "never-ending a cappella climax." Dave Younk of St. Cloud Times complimented the song as "excellent" with "the most incredible a cappella ending that seems to pleasantly go on forever".

== Track listings ==
- CD single
1. "Don't Don't Tell Me No" (album version) – 4:52
2. "Right Beside You" (The Grid 7-inch mix) – 3:38
3. "Right Beside You" (The Grid dub mix) – 8:40
4. "Big Beautiful Bottom in My Face" – 2:55
- CD and cassette single
1. "Don't Don't Tell Me No" (album version) – 4:52
2. "Swing from Limb to Limb (My Home Is Your Jungle)" (album version) – 4:15
- CD single (UK CD2)
1. "Don't Don't Tell Me No" (album version) – 4:52
2. "I Need Nothing Else" (album version) – 4:15
3. "Damn I Wish I Was Your Lover" (album version) – 5:24
4. "Right Beside You" (The Grid 12-inch mix) – 8:35
- 12-inch single (UK release)
1. "Don't Don't Tell Me No" (album version) – 4:52
2. "Swing from Limb to Limb (My Home Is Your Jungle)" – 4:15
3. "Right Beside You" (The Grid 12-inch mix) – 8:35
4. "Right Beside You" (The Grid 7-inch mix) – 3:38

== Personnel ==
Don't Don't Tell Me No

- Sophie B. Hawkins – vocals, keyboards, programming
- Stephen Lipson – bass, programming
- Peter Vettese – keyboards
- Neil Conti – drum set

Production

- Stephen Lipson – producer on "Don't Don't Tell Me No", "Right Beside You", "Swing from Limb to Limb" and "I Need Nothing Else"
- Heff Moraes – engineer on "Don't Don't Tell Me No", "Right Beside You", "Swing from Limb to Limb" and "I Need Nothing Else"
- Sophie B. Hawkins – producer, recording and mixing on "Big Beautiful Bottom in My Face"
- Rick Chertoff, Ralph Schuckett – producers of "Damn I Wish I Was Your Lover"
- Steve Churchyard, David Leonard – mixing on "Damn I Wish I Was Your Lover"
- The Grid – remixes of "Right Beside You"

== Charts ==
Chart (1994–95)	Peak position
Europe (European Hit Radio)	37
Germany (GfK)	69
Iceland (Íslenski Listinn Topp 40)	31
UK Singles (OCC)	36
UK Airplay (Music Week)	11
