= Even Tho (Joseph Arthur song) =

Single by Joseph Arthur

from the album Our Shadows Will Remain
- Released: September 26, 2005
- Recorded: 2004
- Genre: Alternative rock
- Length: 3:59 (radio edit); 4:46 (album version)
- Label: 14th Floor Records
- Songwriter: Joseph Arthur
- Producers: Joseph Arthur, Mike Napolitano

Joseph Arthur singles chronology
"Can't Exist" (2005)	"Even Tho" (2005)	"Devil's Broom" (2006)

"Even Tho" is the second single from Joseph Arthur's fourth studio album Our Shadows Will Remain. "Even Tho" features strings provided by the City of Prague Philharmonic. The single was released on September 26, 2005, in the UK on CD and 10" vinyl formats. The album takes its title from a line in the song: "No one to hold / The world will make a dream and a prayer out of our bones / To find where we belong / Our shadows will remain even after we are gone."

A video for the song was produced, directed by Noaz Deshe and David Incorvaia. It features a wind-up toy pig and his adventures through the world. The same footage was used for a music video created for Arthur's song "Failed".

== Track listing ==
CD (JA03CD):

1. "Even Tho" (Edit) – 3:59
2. "Even Tho" (Live at 93 Feet East) – 3:57

10" (green vinyl, JA03TE):

1. "Even Tho" – 4:46
2. "Even Tho" (Dan the Automator Remix) – 4:42

== Notes ==
- All songs written by Joseph Arthur.
- "Even Tho" produced by Joseph Arthur and Mike Napolitano.
- "Even Tho" recorded live at 93 Feet East, July 20, 2005. Recorded and mixed by Graham Pattison.
