= 9 Bullets =

American film by Gigi Gaston

- Theatrical release poster
- Directed by: Gigi Gaston
- Written by: Gigi Gaston
- Based on: Gypsy Rose Lee
- Produced by: Wendy Benge; Cassian Elwes; Gigi Gaston; Michael D. Jones; Paul Robarts; Veronica Radaelli; Tommy Thompson
- Starring: Lena Headey; Sam Worthington; Dean Scott Vazquez
- Cinematography: Byron Werner
- Edited by: Eve Doherty; Halima K. Gilliam
- Music by: Hugo de Chaire
- Production companies: Foresight Unlimited; Pop Films; Screen Media Films
- Distributed by: Screen Media Films; MDfilm; Rialto Distribution; Screen Media
- Release date: April 22, 2022
- Running time: 97 minutes
- Country: United States
- Language: English
- Box office: $193,908

9 Bullets is a 2022 American action thriller film written and directed by Gigi Gaston, starring Lena Headey, Sam Worthington, and Dean Scott Vazquez. The film was produced in California during the height of the COVID-19 pandemic. Gaston's inspiration for the film was based on her close friendship with the burlesque performer Gypsy Rose Lee. The film was formerly known as Gypsy Moon. It was released in select American theatres on April 22, 2022 by Screen Media, grossed $193,908 in total revenue worldwide, and received generally negative reviews from critics.

== Backstory ==
9 Bullets writer and director Gigi Gaston, attributes much of her inspiration for the film to her close friendship with the burlesque performer Gypsy Rose Lee. She recalls Lee pointing to her body and stating, "This is what all the men see, but what's really important is what's in between my ears." In the hopes of empowering women, Gaston added strong female characters to the story. Her son, Dash, was also an influence on the story. The film was originally known as Gypsy Moon, and while in pre-production, it was called Dixie.

== Plot ==
Gypsy, a former burlesque dancer who seeks redemption, takes a second chance at life by becoming an author, all while risking everything to rescue Sam, her young neighbor who witnessed his parents' murder. While determined to write her memoir, she spends much of her time trying to bring the boy to safety by evading the local crime boss and her longtime ex-lover, who wants what the boy possesses—access to his missing money.

Sam's father has cheated a certain Jack out of $750,000, so Jack has his entire family shot to make an example of him. Sam was not in the car, and manages to escape with his dog and is taken in by Gypsy. She was also involved with Jack, but he cheated on her with other women.

Jack's gang sees Sam's dog in Gypsy's pick-up, so Jack calls Gypsy to his home. There they tag Gypsy's car with a tracker and follow her to the motel where she is hiding Sam. Sam and Gypsy manage to escape, throw the tracker into a passing convertible and change into a car with Tasmin in it on the way. They drive to Lacy, Gypsy's trusted professor from her time at college, and leave Sam with her. Gypsy drives on with Tasmin to a cemetery where Gypsy has hidden a bag of money. Sam is waiting there because he knows about the hiding place, but Gypsy and Tasmin manage to escape separately. Tasmin leaks Lacy's location, where Lacy shoots one of the invaders. Lacy drives with Sam to a prearranged location where they meet Gypsy.

Sam explains that he has invested Jack's $750,000 in Bitcoin, which is now worth $6 million. Gypsy has Sam transfer the money to Jack, which is supposed to clear any guilt. But Jack's new girlfriend sees things differently and wants to eliminate Sam. A shoot-out occurs and Gypsy is seriously injured but survives in hospital. Sam explains that a computer virus was involved in the transfer, which channelled the money to a charitable foundation for orphans, but he kept 3 million. The end credits show the two of them in a newly purchased convertible.

== Cast ==
- Lena Headey as Gypsy
- Sam Worthington as Jack
- Dean Scott Vazquez as Sam
- Martin Sensmeier as Eddie
- Chris Mullinax as Mike
- Cam Gigandet as Tommy
- La La Anthony as Tasmin
- Emma Holzer as Lisa
- Donna Hood as Cupid
- Anthony Fitzgerald as Mel
- Stephanie Arcila as Caroline
- Zachary Mooren as Ralph
- Marlene Forte as Grandmother
- John Ales as Rabbi Stein
- Cornelia Guest as Jennifer
- Barbara Hershey as Lacy
- Colleen Camp as Drew
- Dalila Ali Rajah as Officer Cindy

== Production ==
9 Bullets was financed by 120 dB Films, and filmed in Santa Clarita and Los Angeles in California during the height of the COVID-19 pandemic. It was filmed using Alexa Mini cameras, giving it a clean and crisp clarity on 1080p video, with a primary audio soundtrack recorded in 5.1 DTS-HD MA and with a musical score that provides the film with an expansive sound stage. The original score written by Hugo de Chaire is included on the soundtrack album which was released on all major digital music services.

== Release ==
On February 9, 2022, Screen Media announced that it had acquired all North American rights to the film, and was closing deals in key international markets. On April 22, 2022, the film had a limited release in select theaters in major U.S. cities and was available on Digital HD from Amazon Prime Video and iTunes. Screen Media began a day-and-date release on its advertising-supported video-on-demand services. The film was released on DVD & Blu-ray on June 7, 2022.

== Reception ==
=== Box office ===
As of January 28, 2023, 9 Bullets has grossed $10,601 in Europe and the Middle East, and $183,307 in Asia Pacific, for a total worldwide gross of $193,908.

=== Critical response ===
9 Bullets was generally not well received by top film critics. Cath Clarke writes in The Guardian, "Headey is never less than watchable, but what a wasted opportunity." In The Austin Chronicle, Richard Whittaker saw the film as having both, "Lousy plotting and beyond questionable character motivations" which he believes, "bring the story to a constant, grinding halt." Courtney Howard, film reviewer for The A.V. Club, called it "a dud, yet one made semi-palatable thanks to a decent performance from leading lady Lena Headey, and of all things, a soulful ballad written by Diane Warren."

On the review aggregator website Rotten Tomatoes, 0% of 18 critics' reviews are positive, with an average rating of 3/10. Metacritic, which uses a weighted average, assigned the film a score of 0 out of 100, based on 3 critics, indicating "overwhelming dislike".

== See also ==
- Gypsy Rose Lee – American burlesque performer, actress and writer (1911–1970)
