= Our Shadows Will Remain =

Studio album by Joseph Arthur
- Released: September 28, 2004
- Recorded: 2003–2004
- Studios: The Nappy Dugout, New Orleans; Ken Rich's place, New York City; Fluid, New York City; Dubway Studios, New York City; Excello Recording, Brooklyn; Ernest Hemingway Studios, New York City; David Kosten's place, London; Barrandov Studios, Prague
- Genre: Alternative rock
- Length: 45:51
- Labels: Vector Recordings; 14th Floor Records
- Producers: Joseph Arthur; Mike Napolitano; Ken Rich; David Kosten

Joseph Arthur chronology
Holding the Void (2003)	Our Shadows Will Remain (2004)	And the Thieves Are Gone (2004)

Singles from Our Shadows Will Remain
- 1. "Can't Exist" Released: July 4, 2005; 2. "Even Tho" Released: September 26, 2005; 3. "Devil's Broom" Released: February 13, 2006; 4. "Can't Exist" Released: May 1, 2006 (reissue)

Our Shadows Will Remain is the fourth studio album by Joseph Arthur. The album was released in the US on September 28, 2004 on 12" vinyl and October 12, 2004 on CD, then in the UK on July 11, 2005 on CD and double 12" vinyl. The recording sessions also spawned the companion EP, And the Thieves Are Gone. There were four singles released when the album was picked up for UK distribution by 14th Floor Records. An extensive nationwide tour of the US followed the album's release, including dates with Joan Wasser. In 2005, Arthur went on a brief tour throughout Europe with R.E.M.

== Background ==
Joseph Arthur began the recording of Our Shadows Will Remain shortly after tour dates supporting Tracy Chapman and worldwide solo tour dates (promoting his previous album Redemption's Son) in late 2003. The album was recorded across New Orleans, New York City, London and Prague. Joseph produced the album with Mike Napolitano, Ken Rich, and David Kosten. Joseph, who has battled with alcoholism and drug abuse throughout his entire life, said in an October 2004 interview with Paste Magazine: "I got totally wasted for a while in New Orleans, then I went to L.A. and was going further that way, and I called up my friends in New Orleans and said, 'I'm coming back and I have to straighten out and you have to help me.'" Joseph remained sober and returned to Mike Napolitano and his French Quarter apartment/studio to finish the album. The strings were arranged by Andrew Sherman, and were played by the City of Prague Philharmonic.

The record is largely about finding out where I'm at now... There was a lot of addiction and a lot of pain, and a lot of the songs are about that. When your life isn't working out, you dig deeper into what's going to satisfy you. If you become disillusioned, you start to get to the heart of the matter.

During the recording of the album, Joseph also wrote and recorded a new song for the film Shrek 2, titled "You're So True". The song plays during the end credits of the film and also appears on the movie's soundtrack.

== Singles and promotion ==
In December 2004, Vector Recordings released an EP entitled And the Thieves Are Gone, available only at American independent music retail stores. The EP featured six previously unreleased tracks, mostly recorded during the New Orleans sessions for Our Shadows Will Remain. Prior to the release of Our Shadows Will Remain in the UK, the non-album track "All of Our Hands" was issued as a single with the album version of "A Smile That Explodes" on the B-side.

In the UK, there were four singles released from the album. "Can't Exist" was issued as the first single on July 4, 2005. Both formats of the single featured the exclusive B-side "Real as Rain". On September 26, 2005, "Even Tho" was released as the album's second single. The CD featured an unreleased live version of "Even Tho" as the B-side, while the 10" vinyl single was pressed on dark-green vinyl and featured a remix of "Even Tho" by Dan the Automator. To coincide with Joseph's February 2006 tour across the United Kingdom, "Devil's Broom" was issued as the third single. B-sides included the exclusive non-album track "Papa" as well as a live cover of The Smiths' "There Is a Light That Never Goes Out". In May 2006, "Can't Exist" was reissued as the fourth single. The single was released on three separate 7" vinyl singles, each one pressed on a different color vinyl, and featuring a different recording of "Can't Exist" (part one featured the radio edit, part two featured an acoustic version, and part three featured a live recording taken from his February 24, 2006 performance at Shepherd's Bush Empire). Music videos were created for all three singles, directed by filmmaker Noaz Deshe.

Between July 2004 and mid-2006, Joseph embarked on several worldwide tours to promote Our Shadows Will Remain, including multiple tours across the United States, United Kingdom, and Europe. In total, Joseph performed 87 gigs in 2004, 102 gigs in 2005, and 78 gigs in 2006.

== Critical reception ==
Professional ratings
Aggregate scores
Source	Rating
Metacritic	82/100
Review scores
Source	Rating
AllMusic	4.5/5 stars
Blender	3.5/5 stars
Entertainment Weekly	A
The Guardian	4/5 stars
Mojo	4/5 stars
Pitchfork	7.8/10
Q	4/5 stars
Slant Magazine	3/5 stars
Stylus	A−
Uncut	6/10

Our Shadows Will Remain was released to positive acclaim in both the United States and Europe. AllMusic awarded the album 4.5 out of 5 stars, praising that, "Arthur is in a class of his own and Our Shadows Will Remain is a monstrous, memorable outing, his finest moment in a career that is thus far full of them." Entertainment Weekly gave the album an A rating, hailing the album as "especially forceful and cohesive"; The Guardian hailed that Joseph "might just be a genuine mad genius"; Stylus Magazine gave the album an A− rating; and Chris Rubin of Rolling Stone named Our Shadows Will Remain as the number 1 album of the year 2004 in the year-end critics' pick list, and stated that, "The singer-songwriter from Akron weaves his dark tales through tempestuous music, and Shadows is as good as music gets."

== Track listing ==
All tracks are written by Joseph Arthur.

No.	Title	Length
1.	"In Ohio"	0:46
2.	"Can't Exist"	4:08
3.	"Stumble and Pain"	4:43
4.	"Devil's Broom"	4:46
5.	"Echo Park"	2:51
6.	"Even Tho"	4:47
7.	"Puppets"	3:54
8.	"Wasted"	4:13
9.	"Failed"	4:22
10.	"I Am"	4:14
11.	"A Smile That Explodes"	3:22
12.	"Leave Us Alone"	3:47

UK iTunes-only bonus tracks
No.	Title	Length
13.	"You May Go"	4:19
14.	"And the Night Goes On"	4:01

== Release history ==
Country	Date	Label	Format	Catalogue #	Notes
United States	September 28, 2004	Vector Recordings	LP	70000-1	
United States	October 12, 2004	Vector Recordings	CD	70000-2	Comes with a die-cut slipcase and 36-page booklet
United Kingdom	July 11, 2005	14th Floor Records	CD	5050467 888623	Comes with a die-cut slipcase and 36-page booklet
United Kingdom	July 11, 2005	14th Floor Records	Double LP	5050467 888616	Comes in a die-cut gatefold sleeve with picture inner sleeves; heavyweight vinyl

== Credits ==
Musicians

- Joseph Arthur – vocals, acoustic and electric guitars, dobro, electric and synth bass, acoustic and electric piano, synths, programming, organ, percussion and OmniChord.
- Andrew Sherman – acoustic and electric piano, clavinet, organ and synthesizer.
- Mike Napolitano – programming.
- Julia Darling – vocals on track 11.
- Ethan Eubanks – drums on 4, 6, 7 and 9.
- Brian Geltner – drums on 3.
- Greg "G. Wiz" Wieczorek – drums on 3 and 12.
- Rene Lopez – drums on 2 and 10.
- The City of Prague Philharmonic – strings on 3, 5 and 6.

Technical

- Produced by Joseph Arthur with:
  - Mike Napolitano on tracks 2, 3, 6, 7, 8, 9, 10 and 12.
  - Ken Rich on tracks 4 and 11.
  - David Kosten on tracks 1 and 5 (additional on 4).
  - Additional and end game production throughout by Ken Rich and Andrew Sherman.
- String arrangements by Andrew Sherman on tracks 3, 5 and 6.
- Mixed by Rick Will with Joseph Arthur and help from early Mike Napolitano mixes.
- Mix assistant Andy Sarroff.
  - Track 1 mixed by David Kosten.
  - Track 6 mixed by John Alafia and Jon Altschiller.
  - Additional mixing on tracks 2 and 6 by Ken Rich and Andrew Sherman.
- Engineered by Mike Napolitano, Dawn Landes, Jaraj Durovic (strings), Rick Will and Joseph Arthur.
- Mastered by Ted Jensen at Sterling Sound, NYC.

Visual

- Drawings and paintings by Davies.
- Photography by Zachary Larner.
- Art direction and design by Zachary Larner and Joseph Arthur.
