= Whaler (album) =

Studio album by Sophie B. Hawkins
- Released: August 2, 1994
- Recorded: March – June 1994
- Studios: Sophie's Tugboat Palace (New York City, New York); The Aquarium and Metropolis Studios (London, UK)
- Genre: Pop
- Length: 47:48
- Label: Columbia
- Producer: Stephen Lipson

Sophie B. Hawkins chronology
Tongues and Tails (1992)	Whaler (1994)	Timbre (1999)

Singles from Whaler
- 1. "Right Beside You" Released: July 25, 1994; 2. "Don't Don't Tell Me No" Released: November 14, 1994; 3. "As I Lay Me Down" Released: February 7, 1995; 4. "Did We Not Choose Each Other" Released: 1995; 5. "Only Love (The Ballad of Sleeping Beauty)" Released: 1996

Professional ratings
Review scores
Source	Rating
AllMusic	4/5 stars
Robert Christgau	(dud)
The Encyclopedia of Popular Music	3/5 stars
Entertainment Weekly	B+
Knoxville News Sentinel	2/5 stars
Los Angeles Times	2/4 stars
People Magazine	(mixed)
Rolling Stone	2/5 stars

Whaler is the second album by American singer-songwriter Sophie B. Hawkins, released in 1994 on Columbia Records. The release was preceded by the single "Right Beside You", which reached No. 56 on the Billboard Hot 100 chart, but did much better in the UK, where it peaked at No. 13.

The album was not as commercially successful as her debut album Tongues and Tails two years earlier; however, the sales picked up after the third single, "As I Lay Me Down", released at the beginning of 1995, went to No. 1 on the Adult Contemporary chart. Consequently, the album managed to climb to No. 65 on the Billboard 200 chart.

== Critical reception ==
Professional ratings
Review scores
Source	Rating
AllMusic	4/5 stars
Robert Christgau	(dud)
The Encyclopedia of Popular Music	3/5 stars
Entertainment Weekly	B+
Knoxville News Sentinel	2/5 stars
Los Angeles Times	2/4 stars
People Magazine	(mixed)
Rolling Stone	2/5 stars

The critical reception was mixed. Paul Evans of Rolling Stone said that the album did not quite live up to the standard and expectations set by her debut. The Los Angeles Times review noted that Hawkins tries to knit "a crazy quilt of styles" trying to combine different influences but the experimentation does not pay off and "unravels at the seams", and the only tracks that do work are the mainstream ones, such as the "dance-floor-friendly" opening track "Right Beside You" and the "anguished" ballad "I Need Nothing Else". Other reviews were more favorable, praising the album's subdued and subtle melodies, which make the album overall more consistent than her debut outing, and describing some tracks as "irresistibly catchy".

== Track listing ==
All tracks are written by Sophie B. Hawkins, except "Right Beside You," written by Hawkins, Rick Chertoff, and Stewart Lerman.

No.	Title	Length
1.	"Right Beside You"	4:47
2.	"Did We Not Choose Each Other"	4:25
3.	"Don't Don't Tell Me No"	4:53
4.	"As I Lay Me Down"	4:08
5.	"Swing from Limb to Limb (My Home Is in Your Jungle)"	4:15
6.	"True Romance"	2:23
7.	"Let Me Love You Up"	3:26
8.	"Only Love (The Ballad of Sleeping Beauty)"	5:05
9.	"I Need Nothing Else"	4:17
10.	"Sometimes I See"	4:40
11.	"Mr. Tugboat Hello"	5:30
Total length:		47:48

== Personnel ==
=== Musicians ===
- Sophie B. Hawkins – vocals, keyboards, programming, percussion
- Peter-John Vettese – keyboards
- Stephen Lipson – programming, bass guitar
- Neil Conti – drums
- Luís Jardim – percussion

=== Production ===
- Stephen Lipson – producer
- Heff Moraes – engineer, mixing
- Christopher Austopchuk – art direction
- Nicky Lindeman – art direction, design
- Chika Azuma – design
- Merri Cyr – photography
- Mark Hanauer – photography
- Q Prime – management

== Charts ==
=== Album ===
Chart (1994–1995)	Peak position
Australian Albums (ARIA)	31
Dutch Albums (Album Top 100)	56
European Top 100 Albums (Music & Media)	93
German Albums (Offizielle Top 100)	50
New Zealand Albums (RMNZ)	13
Swiss Albums (Schweizer Hitparade)	43
UK Albums (Official Charts)	46
US Billboard 200	65
US Cash Box Top 100 Pop Albums	60

=== Singles ===
Year	Single	Chart	Peak position
1994	"Right Beside You"	Billboard Hot 100	56
1994	"Right Beside You"	Top 40 Mainstream	24
1995	"As I Lay Me Down"	Adult Contemporary	1
1995	"As I Lay Me Down"	Adult Top 40	1
1995	"As I Lay Me Down"	Billboard Hot 100	6
1995	"As I Lay Me Down"	Top 40 Mainstream	3
1996	"Only Love (The Ballad of Sleeping Beauty)"	Adult Contemporary	22
1996	"Only Love (The Ballad of Sleeping Beauty)"	Adult Top 40	19
1996	"Only Love (The Ballad of Sleeping Beauty)"	The Billboard Hot 100	49
1996	"Only Love (The Ballad of Sleeping Beauty)"	Top 40 Mainstream	22

== Sales ==
Region	Certification	Certified units/sales
Germany	—	55,000
