= Gigi Gaston =

American writer-director

Louise Christina Theodora "Gigi" Gaston is an American writer-director.

== Early life ==
Gaston was born in Greenwich, Connecticut, to Teddy Getty Gaston and William Gaston who divorced when she was 8. She was raised in New Canaan, and later moved to the Los Angeles area.

In 1977, while living in Santa Monica, CA, The New York Times noted that Gaston was an equestrian, and she pursued a career in show jumping.

== Career ==
Gaston has written and sold screenplays, including Like a Lady and Mockingbird, to Steve Tisch and New Line Cinema, and Madame Lupescue (to Ron Howard in 1996).

Her first directed film, the documentary The Cream Will Rise (1998) profiled singer/songwriter Sophie B. Hawkins's early years, played at film festivals and was reviewed in Variety.

Gaston directed the 1998 music video for Olivia Newton-John's updated "I Honestly Love You".

Gaston directed the 2002 heist film Beyond the City Limits

Rip It Off with Nastassja Kinski, Alyson Hannigan and Jennifer Esposito, received mixed reviews.

In 2008, Gaston directed the documentary We Will Not Be Silenced about alleged irregularities in the caucuses for the 2008 Democratic party presidential primaries. Though Gaston is a Democrat and her great Grandfather, Mayor of Boston and Governor of Mass, the doc was only discussed in "right of center" blogs and media outlets such as Fox and Friends and others.

In 2012, she wrote and directed the play Room 105: The Highs and Lows of Janis Joplin, featuring Sophie B. Hawkins as Joplin. It opened on October 4, the anniversary of Joplin's death, and its run was extended. It was described as "impressively written and directed" and "a joy" in EDGE Los Angeles, and received good reviews elsewhere.

Her film Alone Together is based on her mother's book of the same title and began production in January 2018.

The film 9 Bullets, inspired by her close friendship with the burlesque performer Gypsy Rose Lee and starring Lena Headey, Sam Worthington, and Dean Scott Vazquez, was released in April 2022 by Screen Media.

== Personal life ==
In 2012, Gaston and Sophie B. Hawkins shared a house in Venice, California.
