= California Here I Come (Sophie B. Hawkins song) =

1992 single by Sophie B. Hawkins

Single by Sophie B. Hawkins

from the album Tongues and Tails
- B-side: "Saviour Child"
- Released: July 1992
- Length: 4:38 (album version); 4:25 (single version)
- Label: Columbia
- Songwriter: Sophie B. Hawkins
- Producers: Rick Chertoff; Ralph Schuckett

Sophie B. Hawkins singles chronology
"Damn I Wish I Was Your Lover" (1992)	"California Here I Come" (1992)	"I Want You" (1992)

"California Here I Come" is a song by American singer-songwriter Sophie B. Hawkins, released in 1992 as the second single from her debut studio album, Tongues and Tails. The song was written by Hawkins and produced by Rick Chertoff and Ralph Schuckett. The song's music video was directed by Kevin Kerslake and produced by Line Postmyr and Tina Silvey.

== Background ==
The song's bridge was influenced by John Steinbeck's 1939 novel The Grapes of Wrath and features Hawkins reciting the Lord's Prayer. In 2004, Hawkins noted that "aspects of the chorus were influenced by Bugs Bunny going through the golden gates and finding 50 foot carrots". She added, "I had never been to California when I wrote the song. The lyrics are great to savor live, and they get truer somehow as time goes on."

== Critical reception ==
Upon its release, Larry Flick of Billboard considered the song to be "an equally literate, highly potent pop/rock journey" to Hawkins' debut single "Damn I Wish I Was Your Lover". He praised the single remix for providing "more emphasis on the melody" and giving it "a lighter, more accessible tone". Randy Clark of Cash Box commented, "With her Madonna-meets-Chrissie Hynde voice and unusually structured songwriting style, Sophie could get more AC play on this track." Music & Media stated, "With this follow up to 'Damn I Wish I Was Your Lover', this young singer/songwriter is destined to become the next Cyndi Lauper." Victoria Thieberger of The Age noted Hawkins' "distinctive voice" was "measured but warm" on the track. She also praised the song for being "richly orchestrated with a romantic synth sound over a heavy bass".

== Track listings ==
7-inch and cassette single

1. "California Here I Come" (remix) – 4:20
2. "Saviour Child" – 4:45

CD single (UK and Europe)

1. "California Here I Come" (remix) – 4:25
2. "California Here I Come" (LP version) – 4:38
3. "Saviour Child" – 4:43

CD single (Europe)

1. "California Here I Come" – 4:20
2. "Saviour Child" – 4:43
3. "Damn I Wish I Was Your Lover" (remix) – 4:39

CD single (US release)

1. "California Here I Come" – 4:20
2. "Saviour Child" – 4:43

== Personnel ==
Production

- Rick Chertoff, Ralph Schuckett – producers of "California Here I Come" and "Saviour Child"
- Steve Churchyard – recording on "California Here I Come" and "Saviour Child"
- David Leonard – mixing on "California Here I Come"

Other

- Sophie B. Hawkins – illustration

== Charts ==
Chart (1992)	Peak position
Australia (ARIA)	104
Canada Top Singles (RPM)	39
Germany (GfK)	77
New Zealand (Recorded Music NZ)	43
UK Singles (Official Charts)	53
US Cash Box Top 100 Pop Singles	79

== Release history ==
Region	Date	Format(s)	Label(s)	Ref.
United States	July 1992	7-inch vinyl; CD; cassette	Columbia	
Japan	August 21, 1992	Mini-CD	Sony	
Australia	August 31, 1992	CD; cassette	Columbia	
United Kingdom	August 31, 1992	7-inch vinyl; 12-inch vinyl; CD; cassette	Columbia	
