= C. Gibbs =

American singer-songwriter

Christian Gibbs, often credited as C. Gibbs, is an American singer and songwriter originally from San Diego, California, now based in Brooklyn, NY. He was a member of Jim Thirlwell's band Foetus, played guitar in Modern English, fronted the rock trio Morning Glories and pursued a solo career when signing to Atlantic Records for one album in 1999. In 2006 Christian Gibbs formed the chamber-rock group Lucinda Black Bear.

== Discography ==
- 1999 29 Over Me (album) (Atlantic)
- 1999 Sincerity's Ground (album) (Earth Music)
- 2002 Pinkerman Set (album) (Rubric)
- 2005 Parade of Small Horses (album) (Rubric)
- 2007 Capo My Heart & Other Bear Songs (album) (Eastern Spurs/Irascible)
- 2010 Medicine Bag (album) (Eastern Spurs/Irascible)
- 2011 Knives (album) (Eastern Spurs)
- 2012 Parody's Pal (EP) (Eastern Spurs)
- 2013 Sleep The Machines (album) (Eastern Spurs)
- 2015 C.Gibbs Sings Motherwell Johnston (Eastern Spurs)
- 2018 He Arrived By Helicopter: The Shiny Hostel (Eastern Spurs)
