= Ken Rich =

American music producer (born 1967)

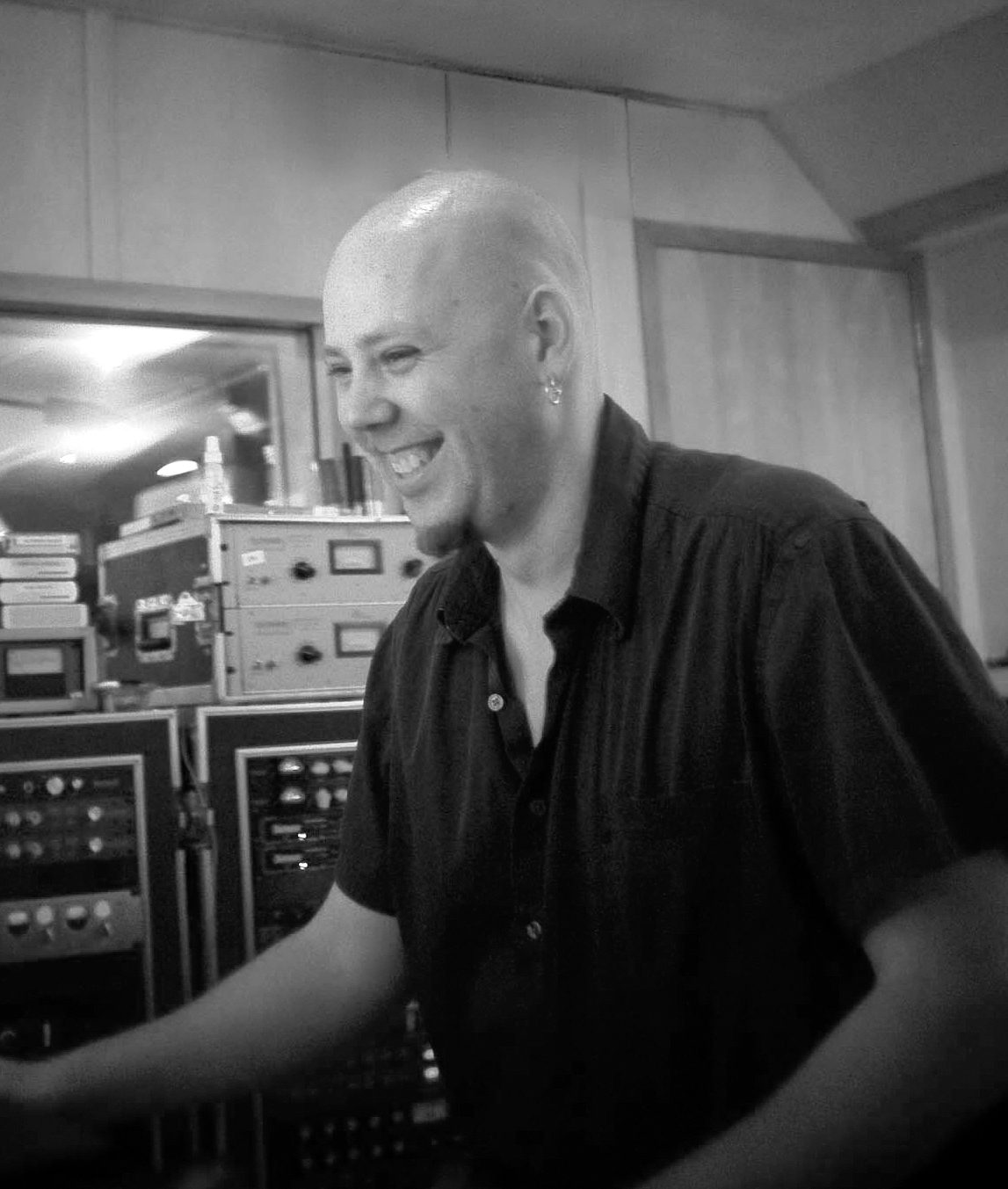
- Born: August 25, 1967 (age 59); Seattle, Washington, U.S.
- Education: BA, Oberlin College
- Occupations: Music producer, composer, recording and mix engineer, studio owner, musician
- Years active: 1990-present
- Employer(s): Grand Street Recording, Brooklyn, NY
- Website: https://www.grandstreetrecording.com/

Ken Rich (born 1967) is an American recording studio owner, producer, engineer, composer and musician. Rich has worked with artists such as Tracy Bonham, Angus & Julia Stone, Big Yuki, Ingrid Michaelson, Dar Williams, Joseph Arthur, Morley, Valerie June, Sophie B. Hawkins, Toshi Reagon, Lizz Wright, Brian Blade, and Cory Henry. In 2008, he received the Ovation Award for Intimate Theater and the L.A. Drama Critics Circle Award for Sound Design.

== Early life and education ==
Rich was born in Seattle, Washington, United States and grew up in Brookline, Massachusetts, where he began playing violin at age five. He took up tuba at nine and electric bass at fifteen, the instrument that would define his professional career. At Oberlin College, where he majored in philosophy and minored in religion, he played in the big band jazz ensemble under Wendell Logan and later Donald Byrd, graduating with a Bachelor of Arts in 1989.

== Career ==
After college, Rich returned to Boston, where he studied with Bruce Bartlett and Ed Friedland and played gigs with Bob Moses, Peter Calo, Stan Strickland, and Myanna, among others.

He moved to New York City in late 1990 and quickly established himself in the session and live music scene, playing regular blues gigs at Mondo Cane and Mondo Perso as well as with rock bands Blue Leaves (1994), Pull My Daisy (1995), Julia Darling and Miami Relatives (2001), performing regularly at CBGB, The Mercury Lounge, Arlene's Grocery, and The Bitter End. Rich served as bassist and musical director of Babatunde Olatunji's New York-based band from 1994 until Olatunji's death in 2004.

His early session work in NYC included David Byrne's "It Goes Back," "Offbeat: a Red Hot Soundtrip," Shabba Ranks' Grammy Award-winning album X-tra Naked (1993), and Laurie Anderson's "In Our Sleep" with Lou Reed. Those sessions inspired Rich to build a home recording studio in his Upper East Side railroad apartment, where he began composing for the NBA, WNBA, HBO, and VH1, while producing independent artists.

In 1998 he moved to the East Village, and in 2001 to Cobble Hill, Brooklyn, where he produced Joseph Arthur’s album Our Shadows Will Remain— voted Entertainment Weekly's Album of the Year and Chris Rubin's (Rolling Stone) number one album of 2004. He also co-produced Arthur's "You're so True,"which appeared on the Shrek 2 soundtrack. During this period Rich also produced Tracy Bonham's "Blink The Brightest"(Zoe Records), Rene Lopez's "One Man's Year", and Morley's "Days Like These" (Universal France), and co-produced and recorded Julia Darling's self-titled album.

In 2004, Rich moved to Williamsburg, Brooklyn, and in 2006 opened Grand Street Recording.

== Awards ==
Rich's score and sound design for Alex Lyras's play The Common Air received three honors in 2008: a Back Stage Garland Awards nomination, the Ovation Award for Intimate Theater, and the L.A. Drama Critics Circle Award for Sound Design.

== Select Discography ==
Year	Artist	Title	Role	Notes
2026	Justin Hicks	Man of Style	mixing	Produced by Meshell NDegeocello and Chris Bruce
2026	Julia Keefe Indigenous Big Band	Incarnadine	engineer, mixing	
2026	Levy / Rose / Finland	Easy Going	engineer, mixing	
2026	Block	"Over and Over" single	engineer	
2026	Katie Bull	The Hope Etudes	engineer, mixing	
2026	Andy Nichol	Simpleton	producer, engineer, mixing	
2025	Tracy Bonham	Sky Too Wide	engineer, mixing	
2025	Morley	Follow The Sound	engineer, mixing	
2025	Dar Williams	Hummingbird Highway	producer, engineer, mixing	
2025	Moses Patrou	Confession of a Fool	producer, engineer, mixing	
2025	Gregg Belisle-Chi	Performing the Music of Tim Berne - Slow Crawl	engineer, mixing, mastering	
2025	Valerie June	Runnin' and Searchin'	engineer	
2025	Jung Stratmann Quartet	Confluence	mixing, mastering	
2025	Brady Rymer	Baby Rhino	producer, engineer, mixing	
2025	Brady Rymer	Sunny Side Up	producer, engineer, mixing	
2024	Joy Askew	Live at Grand Street Recording	engineer, mixing	
2024	BG & Coyote Radio	Drive West	engineer, mixing	
2024	Julia Keefe	Mildred Bailey Project	engineer, mixing	
2024	Chris Bergson Band	Comforts of Home	engineer, mixing	Named one of Soul Bag magazine’s Best Albums of 2024
2024	Merrick Brannigan	The Breeze	producer, engineer, mixing	
2024	Roderick Hohl	Back Home	engineer	
2024	Jamie McLean Band	One Step Forward	engineer, mixing	
2024	Gregg Belisle-Chi	Hum	engineer, mixing, mastering	
2024	Chris Cheek	Live in Hamburg	mixing	
2024	Valerie June	Friendship (Feat. Carla Thomas)	engineer	
2024	Valerie June	Gifts, Presents, and Treats	engineer, mixing	
2024	Theo Kandel	Honeydew Moon	engineer	
2023	Allison Miller	River In Our Veins	engineer	
2023	The Bruces & Friends	Story of the Sky	mixing, mastering	
2023	The Healers	The Healers (ft. Peter Hutchison)	engineer, mixing	
2023	Weird Fiction	Cracking Up	engineer, mixing	
2023	Alec Berlin	Space Punk & Other Junk	engineer	
2023	Luca Benedetti	Ride Awhile	engineer, mixing	
2023	Jared Saltiel	Dream Song	producer, engineer, mixing, bass	
2023	Aarons Finland & Rose	Introducing	engineer, mixing	
2023	Towne & Stevens	Towne & Stevens	engineer, bass	
2023	Sophie B. Hawkins	Free Myself	producer, bass, engineer, mixing	
2022	Joy Askew	Everything is Different	engineer, mixing	
2022	John Putnam	Homegrown	mixing, mastering	
2022	Harvey Mandel	Who's Calling	engineer	
2022	The Pine Cats	Bedouin Breakfast	engineer, mixing, mastering	
2022	Zoar	Winter Wind	bass	
2021	Loudboy	The Late Heavy Bombardment	producer, engineer, mixing, programming, celeste, Marxophone	
2021	C. Gibbs	Tales From the Terramar	engineer, mixing	
2021	Jenny Marie McAdams	2021 Heartache, I'm Fine	producer, engineer, mixing, bass	
2021	Chris Eminizer	Dialogues and Distant Signals	mixing	
2021	Eric Finland Organ Quartet	The Trick Bag	engineer	
2020	Morley	Thousand Miles	producer, engineer, mixing	
2020	Morley	Borderless Lullabies	engineer, mixing	
2020	C. Gibbs	Armageddon	engineer, mixing, tambourine	
2019	Rene Lopez	Johnny Wants to Be a Matador	engineer, mixing	
2019	Deborah Berg	New Road Home	producer, engineer, mixing, bass	
2019	Chad Yarborough	Whistle in the Mast	producer, engineer, mixing, bass	
2019	C. Gibbs	Ladybird	mixing, shaker, tambourine	
2018	Ingrid Michaelson	Songs for the Season	engineer	
2018	A Great Big World	Younger	engineer	
2018	Amanda Brown	Dirty Water	producer, engineer, mixing	
2018	Toshi Reagon	"Let Me Remember"	engineer	
2018	Chad Yarborough & The Unloveable Monsters	Wild Heart	producer, engineer, mixing, bass	
2018	Greg Wieczorek	Telescope	mixing	
2018	Jared Saltiel	Out Of Clay	engineer, mixing	
2018	Jared Saltiel	One More Revelation	engineer, mixing	
2018	C. Gibbs	He Arrived By Helicopter	mixing	
2017	Brooklyn Boogaloo Blowout	Boog at Sunny's	engineer, mixing	
2017	BigYuki	Reaching for Chiron	engineer, mixing	
2017	Julia Darling	The Great White	producer, engineer, mixing, bass	
2017	Joy Askew	Queen Victoria	engineer, mixing	
2017	Joe Brack	A Good Life	engineer, mixing	
2016	Ingrid Michaelson	It Doesn't Have to Make Sense	engineer	
2016	Bill Sims Jr.	Bill on Bob	producer, engineer, mixing	
2016	Jonatha Brooke	Love is a Battlefield	engineer, mixing	
2016	Patrick Stewart	Patrick Stewart's Cowboy Classics Sampler	engineer, mixing	
2015	Marcus Miller	Afrodeezia	engineer	
2015	Chad Yarborough & The Unloveable Monsters	My Best Goodbyes	producer, engineer, mixing, bass	
2015	Shareef Clayton	North & South	engineer, mixing	
2015	Sunny Ozell	Take It With Me	engineer, mixing	
2015	C. Gibbs	Sings Motherwell Johnston	engineer, mixing	
2014	Noe Venable	Cascadia	engineer, mixing	
2014	Ingrid Michaelson	Lights Out	engineer	
2014	Angus & Julia Stone	Angus & Julia Stone	engineer	
2014	Mike Doughty	Live at Ken's House	engineer	
2014	Secret Someones	Secret Someones	engineer	
2014	Brady Rymer	Just Say Hi!	engineer	
2014	Rene Lopez	Love Has No Mercy	engineer, mixing	
2014	Rene Lopez	Paint the Moon Gold	engineer, mixing	
2014	Thompson	Family	engineer	
2013	Allison Miller's Boom Tick Boom	No Morphine No Lilies	engineer	
2013	Chad Yarborough & The Unloveable Monsters	Science Fiction Love Songs	producer, engineer, mixing, bass	
2013	Chad Yarborough & The Unloveable Monsters	Chad Yarborough & The Unloveable Monsters	producer, engineer, mixing, bass	
2013	Jared Saltiel	The Light Within	engineer, mixing	
2013	C. Gibbs	Sleep the Machines	engineer	
2012	Jonah Smith	Little Known Cure	engineer	
2012	John Putnam	The Way I See It	engineer, mixing	
2012	Deborah Berg	No Rush	producer, engineer, mixing, bass	
2012	Morley	Yoga Release	engineer, mixing, mastering	
2012	Morley	Undivided	engineer, mixing	
2012	Morley	Sea of Oms	mixing, mastering	
2011	The Compulsions	Beat The Devil	producer, engineer, mixing	
2011	Julia Darling	Everything That Has Happened SInce Then	producer, engineer, mixing	
2011	David Mead	Dudes	engineer, mixing	
2011	Emilie Cardinaux	Slow Down	mixing	
2011	The Madison Square Gardeners	Teeth of Champions	engineer	
2011	Keith Paine	Speakeasy	engineer, mixing	
2011	C. Gibbs	Medicine Bag	engineer, mixing	
2011	Mike Errico	Wander Away	producer, engineer, mixing, bass	
2010	Lucinda Black Bear	Knives	mixing	
2010	Tracy Bonham	Masts of Manhatta	engineer, tuba	
2010	Dave Eggar	Kingston Morning	engineer, mixing	
2010	The Droves	Out of Herself	engineer	
2010	Teddy Goldstein	Alright Is the New Fantastic	producer, engineer, mixing, mastering, bass, drum programming, keyboards, Melotron	
2009	The Compulsions	Been Through Hell	producer, engineer, mixing	
2009	Matt Beck	Anything Which Gives You Pleasure	engineer, mixing	
2009	Daru Oda	We Can Start Raging	producer, engineer, mixing	
2008	The Compulsions	Demon Love	producer, engineer, mixing	
2008	Brooklyn Boogaloo Blowout	The Knickerbocker 7"	engineer, mixing	
2008	Ani DiFranco	Red Letter Year	engineer	
2008	Morley	Seen	producer, engineer, mixing	
2008	Teddy Goldstein	Backseat	producer, engineer, mixing	
2008	The Gutter Twins	Saturnalia	engineer	
2008	Brady Rymer	That Friday Feeling	producer, engineer, mixing	
2007	Noe Venable	The Summer Storm Journals	engineer, mixing	
2007	Lucinda Black Bear	Capo My Heart and Other Bear Songs	engineer, mixing, percussion	
2007	William Hart Strecker	Smoke + Clouds	producer, engineer, mixing, baritone guitar, percussion, bass	
2007	Greg Tannen	Rocket	engineer, mixing	
2007	James Katz	Into The Bright White Light	bass	
2006	Brooklyn Boogaloo Blowout	Who Burnt the Bacon?	engineer, mixing	
2005	Tracy Bonham	Blink the Brightest	producer, engineer	
2005	Morley	Days Like These	producer, engineer, mixing, Fender, Rhodes, Glockenspiel, shaker, drum programming	
2005	Rene Lopez	One Man's Year	producer, engineer, mixing, vibraphone, programming, bass, moogbass	
2004	John McDowell	Speaking the Mama Tongue	bass	
2004	The Compulsions	Laughter From Below	producer, engineer, mixing	
2004	William Hart Strecker	All This Dreaming	producer, engineer, bass	
2004	Miami Relatives	EP	producer, engineer, mixing, bass	
2004	Joseph Arthur	Our Shadows Will Remain	producer, engineer, mixing	
2004	Joseph Arthur	And the Thieves Are Gone	producer, engineer	
2003	Julia Darling	Julia Darling	producer, engineer, guitar (12 string), percussion, programming, string arrangement	
2003	Jake Stigers	Comin Back Again	bass	
2002	Miami Relatives	Miami Relatives	producer, engineer, mixing, bass	
1999	Vince Converse	One Step Ahead	composer, bass	
1999	Dean Friedman	Songs for Grownups	bass, engineer	
1998	Ivy Markaity	Silhouette	producer, keyboards, drum programming, bass	
1998	Ivy Markaity	World's Not Big Enough	bass	
1998	Larry Coryell	"Deck The Halls," A Jazz Christmas	producer, mastering	
1996	David Byrne	"It Goes Back," Offbeat - A Red Hot Sound Trip	bass	
1995	Laurie Anderson	In Our Sleep	bass	
1993	Shabba Ranks	X-Tra Naked	bass	Grammy winner, Best Reggae Album, 1993
1991	Myanna	Myanna	bass	

== Film, Television & Podcasts ==
Year	Title	Format	Role	Notes
2025	The Man Card	feature film	mixing	
2025	Hungry	feature film	composer	
2025	Reverend Billy & The Stop Shopping Choir, Live at the Hollywood Bowl	short film	mixing	
2025	The Invisible Doctrine	feature film	sound design, mixing	
2023	The Cure for Hate	feature film	sound design, mixing	
2023	Karen 1%	podcast	engineer, mixing	
2021	Are You Happy Now?	feature film	composer	
2019-2021	Bless The Harts	television series	music mixing, bass	
2004	Shrek 2, "You're So True," Motion Picture Soundtrack	feature film	song engineer	
2000	Whipped	feature film	bass	

== Theater ==
Year	Title	Role	Notes
2002	Unequalibrium	theater score, sound design	
2009-2010	The Common Air	theater score, sound design	
2020	Plasticity	theater score, sound design	
