= Timbre (album) =

Studio album by Sophie B. Hawkins
- Released: July 20, 1999
- Recorded: November 1998 – April 1999
- Genre: Adult contemporary
- Length: 58:44
- Labels: Columbia; Ryko (reissue)
- Producer: Sophie B. Hawkins

Sophie B. Hawkins chronology
Whaler (1994)	Timbre (1999)	The Best of Sophie B. Hawkins (2002)

Re-release cover

Professional ratings
Review scores
Source	Rating
AllMusic	4/5 stars
Entertainment Weekly	C+
Q	4/5 stars
Rolling Stone	3/5 stars
Slant	3.5/5 stars

Timbre is the third album by American singer-songwriter Sophie B. Hawkins, released in 1999. The album was reissued in 2001 with a bonus disc.

One release has censored lyrics in "The Darkest Childe" and "Help Me Breathe".

== Track listing ==
All songs written and produced by Sophie B. Hawkins.

Original release
No.	Title	Length
1.	"Strange Thing (Note: Titled "Walking in My Blue Jeans" on the 2001 reissue; reverted to "Strange Thing" for the digital release.)"	3:53
2.	"No Connection"	4:48
3.	"32 Lines"	5:02
4.	"MMM My Best Friend"	4:41
5.	"Bare the Weight of Me"	4:29
6.	"Nocturne"	4:08
7.	"The Darkest Childe"	5:54
8.	"I Walk Alone"	4:12
9.	"Your Tongue Like the Sun in My Mouth"	5:43
10.	"Lose Your Way"	4:04
11.	"Help Me Breathe"	5:42
12.	"The One You Have Not Seen"	6:09

2001 reissue bonus disc / Digital bonus tracks (Note: Numbered tracks 13–19 on the digital release.)
No.	Title	Length
1.	"You Turn Me On" (new song demo)	3:06
2.	"Travelling Light" (new song demo)	5:42
3.	"I Walk Alone" (Timbre demo)	4:55
4.	"No Connection" (Timbre demo)	6:38
5.	"Walking in My Blue Jeans" (radio edit)	2:52
6.	"Lose Your Way" (Bounce remix)	4:03
7.	"Lose Your Way" (Spanish remix)	4:01

The enhanced section of the bonus disc includes:

- Video biography
- "No Connection" music video
- "The One You Have Not Seen" home demo
- The Cream Will Rise Sundance promo

== Personnel ==
- Sophie B. Hawkins – all vocals, acoustic piano, keyboards, acoustic guitars, electric guitars, banjo, loops, percussion, marimba, vibraphone, djembe, udu, synthesizers (8), string arrangements (8), performer (1-4; Disc 2)

Additional performers

- Chris Fudurich – digital programming, loops
- Joe Bashorun – synthesizers (8), string arrangements (8)
- Olle Romo – additional programming (6; Disc 2)
- Gerry Leonard – guitars
- Michael Landau – additional guitars (8)
- Larry Saltzman – additional guitars (8)
- Mark Goldenberg – guitars (6; Disc 2)
- Paul Bushnell – bass
- Steve Ferrone – drums
- Carlos Vega – drums
- Alex Acuña – additional percussion
- Jon Clarke – oboe
- Skip Waring – trumpet
- Stefanie Fife – cello, string arrangements on verse (2)
- Novi Novog – viola, string arrangements on verse (2)
- Robin Lorenz – violin, string arrangements on verse (2)
- David Rubenstein – string arrangements and conductor (1–7, 9–12)

Production

- Peter Asher – executive producer
- Kevin Killen – executive producer
- Tim Devine – A&R
- Sophie B. Hawkins – producer, arrangements
- Ivy Skoff – production coordinator
- Christine Wilson – art direction, design
- Gigi Gaston – photography
- Trumpet Swan Productions – management

Technical credits

- Bob Ludwig – mastering at Gateway Mastering (Portland, Maine)
- Kevin Killen – engineer, mixing
- Sophie B. Hawkins – original engineer, recording (1–4; Disc 2)
- Mike Shipley – remixing (6; Disc 2)
- Nathaniel Kunkel – additional engineer (8)
- Mark Endert – additional engineer (10)
- Chris Fudurich – assistant engineer, editing
- Al Sanderson – assistant engineer
- David Baerwald – additional assistant engineer
- Ryan Kirk – additional assistant engineer
- Marnie Riley – additional assistant engineer
