= Wilderness (Sophie B. Hawkins album) =

Studio album by Sophie B. Hawkins
- Released: April 20, 2004
- Studios: The Cat House (Venice, New York); Loho Studios (New York City, New York); Studio Atlantis (Los Angeles, California); Radiostar Studios (Weed, California)
- Length: 54:08
- Label: Trumpet Swan
- Producers: Sophie B. Hawkins; the Berman Brothers; Sylvia Massy

Sophie B. Hawkins chronology
The Best of Sophie B. Hawkins (2002)	Wilderness (2004)	Live: Bad Kitty Board Mix (2006)

Professional ratings
Review scores
Source	Rating
The Music Box	1.5/5 stars
Paste	(favorable)
Rolling Stone	(mixed)
Slant Magazine	2.5/5 stars

Wilderness is the fourth album, by American singer-songwriter Sophie B. Hawkins, released in 2004.

== Track listing ==
All tracks are written by Sophie B. Hawkins, except "Feelin' Good" (Leslie Bricusse, Anthony Newley).

No.	Title	Length
1.	"Beautiful Girl"	3:45
2.	"Open Up Your Eyes"	3:30
3.	"Meet Me on a Rooftop"	3:42
4.	"Walking on Thin Ice"	4:08
5.	"Blue"	4:04
6.	"Sweetsexywoman"	4:43
7.	"Surfer Girl"	3:10
8.	"Adrian"	3:26
9.	"Soul Lover"	3:44
10.	"Angel of Darkness"	4:00
11.	"You Make Me High"	3:29
12.	"Feelin' Good"	5:31
13.	"Soul Lover" (Infinite Space Mix)	6:56
Total length:		54:08

== Personnel ==
Musicians

- Sophie B. Hawkins – vocals, acoustic piano, keyboards, programming, guitars, drums, drum programming, percussion
- Christian Berman – keyboards, programming, bass
- Ed Czach – acoustic piano, organ
- Sebastião Batista DaSilva – keyboards, programming
- Kareem Devlin – guitars
- Robby Mildenberger – guitars
- Mike Severne – guitars
- Josh Sklair – guitars
- Chris Papastephanou – guitar "noodles" on verse (10)
- David Piltch – upright bass
- Dave Burns – drums
- Elvis Katić – drums
- Michael Moore – drums
- Andy Neuman – drum programming
- Huckleberry the dog – special appearance (5)

Horns on "Blue"

- Sophie B. Hawkins – horn arrangements
- David Woodford – baritone saxophone, tenor saxophone
- Carl Fischer – trombone, trumpet
- Lee Thornburg – trombone, trumpet, horn arrangements

== Production ==
- Gigi Gaston – executive producer, photography, management
- Sophie B. Hawkins – producer (1–12), arrangements, paintings, photography
- The Berman Brothers – producers (1–12)
- Sylvia Massy – additional production (9)
- Mike Fisher – producer (13)
- Christine Wilson – art direction
- Carolyn Jaskolka – hands photo inserts
- Collective Music Limited – promotion coordinator
- Trumpet Swan Management – management
- Marcee Rondan – publicity
- Bruce Houghton – booking

Technical credits

- Bob Ludwig – mastering at Gateway Mastering (Portland, Maine)
- Adam Ayan – additional mastering
- Christian Berman – recording
- Sophie B. Hawkins – recording
- Jimmy Hoyson – recording
- Michael Kramer – recording
- Sylvia Massy – recording, mixing
- Rich Veltrop – recording, additional mixing (1, 2, 9)
- Joe Chiccarelli – mixing
- Zech Algood – assistant engineer
- Colin Miller – assistant engineer
- Chris Papastephanou – Pro Tools/Logic support, horn engineer (5)
- George Leger III – Pro Tools/Logic support
