= Only Love (The Ballad of Sleeping Beauty) =

1996 single by Sophie B. Hawkins

Single by Sophie B. Hawkins

from the album Whaler
- B-side: "Did We Not Choose Each Other"
- Released: January 30, 1996
- Length: 5:05 (album version); 4:06 (single version)
- Label: Columbia
- Songwriter: Sophie B. Hawkins
- Producer: Stephen Lipson

Sophie B. Hawkins singles chronology
"Did We Not Choose Each Other" (1995)	"Only Love (The Ballad of Sleeping Beauty)" (1996)	"Lose Your Way" (1999)

"Only Love (The Ballad of Sleeping Beauty)" is a song by American singer-songwriter Sophie B. Hawkins, released in January 1996 as the fifth and final single from her second studio album, Whaler (1994). The song was written by Hawkins and produced by Stephen Lipson. "Only Love" peaked at No. 49 on the US Billboard Hot 100. The song's music video was directed by Bonnie Hoffenberg.

== Background ==
For its release as a single, "Only Love" was remixed, much to the disapproval of Hawkins. She told Steve Morse of The Boston Globe in 1996, "I said, 'You've taken all the soul out of the song.' It makes me want to get in there and say, 'What is the matter with you?' People say I shouldn't talk about this, but I'd rather be truthful. The artist is the one who changes the world, not the industry."

== Critical reception ==
On its release as a single, Larry Flick of Billboard described "Only Love" as a "charming sing-along ditty". He felt the chorus is "rife with earnest references to the residual effects of sharing love" which Hawkins "delivers with sweet sincerity".

== Track listing ==
US CD and cassette single

1. "Only Love (The Ballad of Sleeping Beauty)" (radio edit) – 4:06
2. "Did We Not Choose Each Other" – 4:25

Australian CD single

1. "Only Love (The Ballad of Sleeping Beauty)" (radio edit) – 4:06
2. "Only Love (The Ballad of Sleeping Beauty)" (LP version) – 5:05
3. "Only Love (The Ballad of Sleeping Beauty)" (acoustic version) – 4:44
4. "Did We Not Choose Each Other" – 4:25

== Personnel ==
Only Love (The Ballad of Sleeping Beauty)

- Sophie B. Hawkins – vocals, keyboards, programming
- Stephen Lipson – bass, programming
- Peter Vettese – keyboards
- Neil Conti – drum set

Production

- Stephen Lipson – producer
- Sophie B. Hawkins, Randy Jackson – additional production on "Radio Edit" and "Acoustic Version"
- Brian Malouf – mixing
- Heff Moraes – engineer

== Charts ==
Chart (1996)	Peak position
Australia (ARIA)	114
Canada Top Singles (RPM)	7
Canada Adult Contemporary (RPM)	4
US Billboard Hot 100	49
US Adult Contemporary (Billboard)	22
US Adult Pop Airplay (Billboard)	19
US Pop Airplay (Billboard)	22
