= Right Beside You (Sophie B. Hawkins song) =

1994 single by Sophie B. Hawkins

Single by Sophie B. Hawkins

from the album Whaler
- B-side: "The Ballad of Sleeping Beauty"
- Released: July 25, 1994
- Genre: Dance-pop; neo-disco
- Length: 4:46
- Label: Columbia
- Songwriters: Sophie B. Hawkins; Rick Chertoff; Stewart Lerman
- Producer: Stephen Lipson

Sophie B. Hawkins singles chronology
"I Want You" (1992)	"Right Beside You" (1994)	"Don't Don't Tell Me No" (1994)

Music video
- "Right Beside You" on YouTube

"Right Beside You" is a song by American singer-songwriter Sophie B. Hawkins, released in July 1994 by Columbia Records as the first single from her second album, Whaler (1994). The song was written by Hawkins with Rick Chertoff and Stewart Lerman, and it was produced by Stephen Lipson. It reached number 56 on the US Billboard Hot 100 and number seven on the Canadian RPM 100 Hit Tracks chart. In Europe, it became a top-30 hit in several countries, including Switzerland, where it climbed to number eight. The track is Hawkins' highest-charting single in the United Kingdom, where it reached number 13. Its accompanying music video was directed by Albert Watson and filmed in New York, featuring Hawkins on the beach and riding a horse.

== Critical reception ==
Larry Flick from Billboard magazine wrote, "Matching the wickedly catchy 1992 smash 'Damn I Wish I Was Your Lover' is a daunting task. On this peek into the quirky pop poet's sophomore collection, Whaler, she takes a conscious step into the dance/pop arena by offering a kicky ditty that is not as instantly memorable as her breakthrough hit, but ultimately just as strong and durable." He added, "Hawkins delivers an urgent and breathy vocal that may draw comparisons to Madonna, though her own unique style shines through to smarter ears. The single has two rock-solid mixes that will do the trick in enticing top 40, club, and rhythm-crossover programmers. Sweet." Troy J. Augusto from Cash Box named it Pick of the Week, saying, "Slick, danceable track indicates a modest, though thoroughly satisfying, style shift for the lovely Ms. Hawkins who looks to clubs for exposure this time as much as hit radio. Husky and oh-so-seductive vocal delivery makes the difference here, and with nifty remixes offered, looks for almost immediate impact."

Chuck Campbell from Knoxville News Sentinel felt the single "is her best chance at renewed fame. Although it's a shallow neo-disco song, and she sounds uncomfortably like Debbie Gibson, at least it has a catchy chorus." Pan-European magazine Music & Media commented, "Artistically seen, 'Damn I Wish I Was Your Lover' promoted her overnight to a top position deft beside Cyndi Lauper, and there's still no reason to revise our opinion." The reviewer added, "It's only right that the single [...] is exploding on radio". James Hamilton from Music Week's RM Dance Update also described it as a "Madonna-ish canterer" in his weekly dance column. Jonathan Bernstein from Spin remarked, "You can almost hear the waves crash through the opening techno sea-shanty of 'Right Beside You'." Pete Stanton from Smash Hits wrote, "Nice tune, a bit Madonnarish, good use of a beach in the video (forget the horse next time)."

== Music video ==
The music video for "Right Beside You" was directed by Albert Watson, with Tony Phillips as the director of photography and Craig Fanning as executive producer. Before the shoot, Hawkins was learning horseback riding and one of her managers suggested she ride a horse in the upcoming video. Watson liked the idea and felt the song's sound suited a beach setting for the video. The video was shot on a beach near Sag Harbor, New York, in the summer of 1994 during stormy conditions.

== Track listings ==
- US CD single
1. "Right Beside You" (album version) – 4:47
2. "Right Beside You" (radio 7-inch mix) – 4:11
3. "Right Beside You" (classic club mix) – 5:55
4. "Right Beside You" (hard floor mix) – 5:30
5. "The Ballad of Sleeping Beauty" – 5:04
- US and UK cassette single
1. "Right Beside You" (album version)
2. "The Ballad of Sleeping Beauty"
- UK CD1
1. "Right Beside You" (radio 7-inch mix)
2. "Right Beside You" (classic club mix)
3. "Right Beside You" (hard floor mix)
4. "The Ballad of Sleeping Beauty"
- UK CD2
1. "Right Beside You" (LP version)
2. "Right Beside You" (extended Brain remix)
3. "Right Beside You" (7-inch Brain remix)
4. "Damn I Wish I Was Your Lover" (LP version)
- European maxi-CD single
1. "Right Beside You" – 4:46
2. "Right Beside You" (classic club mix) – 5:55
3. "The Ballad of Sleeping Beauty" – 5:04
4. "Right Beside You" (extended Brain remix) – 7:32
- Japanese CD single
1. "Right Beside You" (album version)
2. "Right Beside You" (radio 7-inch mix)
3. "Right Beside You" (hard floor mix)

== Charts ==
=== Weekly charts ===
Chart (1994–1996)	Peak position
Australia (ARIA)	41
Canada Retail Singles (The Record)	4
Canada Top Singles (RPM)	7
Europe (Eurochart Hot 100)	38
Europe (European AC Radio)	17
Europe (European Hit Radio)	3
Germany (GfK)	17
Iceland (Íslenski Listinn Topp 40)	37
Ireland (IRMA)	30
Israel (Israeli Singles Chart)	6
Netherlands (Dutch Top 40)	18
Netherlands (Single Top 100)	15
New Zealand (Recorded Music NZ)	20
Scottish Singles Sales (Official Charts)	10
Sweden (Sverigetopplistan)	30
Switzerland (Schweizer Hitparade)	8
UK Singles (Official Charts)	13
UK Airplay (Music Week)	2
UK Club Chart (Music Week)	56
US Billboard Hot 100	56
US Pop Airplay (Billboard)	24

=== Year-end charts ===
Chart (1994)	Position
Canada Top Singles (RPM)	73
Europe (European Hit Radio)	15
Germany (Media Control)	87
UK Singles (OCC)	75
UK Airplay (Music Week)	14

== Sales ==
Region	Certification	Certified units/sales
United Kingdom	—	135,000

== Release history ==
Region	Date	Format(s)	Label(s)	Ref.
United Kingdom	July 25, 1994	CD; cassette	Columbia	
United States	July 26, 1994	CD; cassette	Columbia	
Australia	August 1, 1994	CD; cassette	Columbia	
Japan	August 25, 1994	CD	Sony	
