= I Want You (Bob Dylan song) =

1966 song by Bob Dylan

- US picture sleeve

Single by Bob Dylan

from the album Blonde on Blonde
- B-side: "Just Like Tom Thumb's Blues" (live version)
- Released: June 10, 1966
- Recorded: March 10, 1966
- Studio: Columbia, Nashville
- Genre: Folk rock
- Length: 3:08 (album version); 2:57 (single edit)
- Label: Columbia
- Songwriter: Bob Dylan
- Producer: Bob Johnston

Bob Dylan singles chronology
| "Rainy Day Women #12 & 35" (1966) | "I Want You" (1966) | "Just Like a Woman" (1966) |

Official audio
- "I Want You" on YouTube

"I Want You" is a song by the American singer-songwriter Bob Dylan, which was released as a single in June 1966, and, later that month, on his seventh studio album, Blonde on Blonde. The song was written by Dylan, and produced by Bob Johnston. The song has been interpreted as a straightforward expression of lust, although critics have highlighted that the symbolism of the song is complex. It was the last song recorded for Blonde on Blonde, with several takes recorded in the early hours of March 10, 1966. It was included on Bob Dylan's Greatest Hits (1967). The song has received a largely positive critical reception, with a number of commentators highlighting Dylan's use of imagery, although some of the meanings are obscure.

Dylan has performed the song live 294 times, from its debut in 1966 to his most recent live rendition in 2005. It was presented in the style of a torch song during his 1978 World Tour, as heard on Bob Dylan at Budokan (1978). Dylan also revisited the song in 1987 on a co-tour with the Grateful Dead; their version was released on Dylan & the Dead (1989). The sessions for the original March 1966 recording were released in their entirety on the 18-disc Collector's Edition of The Bootleg Series Vol. 12: The Cutting Edge 1965–1966 in 2015, with the penultimate take of the song also appearing on the 6-disc and 2-disc versions of that album. The single charted in several countries; it reached number 20 on the Billboard Hot 100, and number 16 on the UK charts. The B-side was a live version of "Just Like Tom Thumb's Blues" recorded in Liverpool, England at the Odeon Theatre in May 1966.

Sophie B. Hawkins recorded what was termed a "breathy techno-MOR"/"quasi hip-hop" version of "I Want You" for Tongues and Tails (1992) and released it as a single which reached No. 49 on the UK Singles Chart in February 1993. Her version received mixed reviews. She performed the song at Dylan's 30th Anniversary Concert Celebration in 1992; the performance was criticised, and was not included on the 1993 double-album and VHS releases of the concert.

== Background and recording ==
American singer-songwriter Bob Dylan started to move away from the contemporary folk music sound that had characterized his early albums with his fourth LP, Another Side of Bob Dylan (1964). The 1965 album Bringing It All Back Home included both electric and acoustic tracks, and was followed by the purely electric Highway 61 Revisited later that year. In 1965, Dylan hired the Hawks as his backing group for live shows, but recording sessions in New York for a new album were not productive with them, and he accepted a suggestion from his producer Bob Johnston that the sessions should transfer to Nashville, Tennessee. Dylan went to Nashville in February 1966, with Al Kooper and Robbie Robertson from the New York sessions also making the trip.

The track was recorded at Columbia Studio A in Nashville in the early hours of March 10, 1966, starting as dawn was approaching. While some of the songs on Blonde on Blonde are in the established Tin Pan Alley "A-A-B-A" form, an extra section at the end of "I Want You" gives it an A-A-B-A-A format . Dylan demonstrated the song to his accompanying musicians using an acoustic guitar. After Johnston had announced that recording had started, and confirmed the song's title with Dylan, guitarist Charlie McCoy asked about the song's intro, which had not been established; Dylan played the chord progression of the intro, and after the band had played through the first take, they discussed the arrangement again before the second take. There were three complete takes of "I Want You" and two incomplete ones. The final take was the master. A version called "Take 5b" is marked with "insert, guitar overdub", though all the musicians involved say there was no guitar overdub. It was the last song recorded for Dylan's seventh album, Blonde on Blonde, with the session concluding at around 7:00 a.m.

== Composition and lyrical interpretation ==
Sean Wilentz felt that the manuscript indicated some "lyrical experiments that fail", such as "deputies asking him his name... lines about fathers going down hugging one another and about their daughters putting him down because he isn't their brother". However, once recording started, the only notable change between the takes was to the tempo. Clinton Heylin felt that the tune used for the song illustrated the sentiment expressed by Dylan when he told an interviewer in 1966 that he took a holistic view of songs: "It's not just pretty words to a tune or putting tunes to words... [It's] the words and the music [together]—I can hear the sound of what I want to say."

Despite the straightforward title, Mike Marqusee found the song to be "packed with enigmatic imagery and haunted by ambivalent emotions". For literature scholar Richard Brown, "the song shows a mastery of its apparently casual form ... it is neatly balanced between the directness of the repeated refrain and the mystery and interest of the material in the stanzas." Andy Gill observed that the song's tension is achieved through the balance of the "direct address" of the chorus, the repeated phrase "I want you," and a weird cast of characters, including a guilty undertaker, a lonesome organ grinder, weeping fathers, mothers, sleeping saviours, the queen of spades, and "a dancing child with his Chinese suit". Gill reports that "the dancing child" has been interpreted as a reference to Brian Jones of The Rolling Stones, and his then girlfriend Anita Pallenberg. Clinton Heylin agrees there may be substance to this interpretation because the dancing child claims that "time was on his side", as an allusion to "Time Is on My Side", the Stones' first U.S. hit.

Noting Dylan's interest in classical literature, English professor Graley Herren hypothesized that the song, which references an undertaker, is about the narrator's failure to accept the death of a loved one, echoing the ancient tale of Orpheus and Eurydice. However, commentators have typically taken the song to be an expression of lust, perhaps for a new love, or someone other than the narrator's current partner. Mellers felt that "The timbre generates an overwhelming erotic compulsion from what on paper is no more than a series of oscillation between two tones."

== Release and reception ==
"I Want You" was released as a single on June 10, 1966. A live version of "Just Like Tom Thumb's Blues recorded in Liverpool on May 14, 1966 was included as the B-side. Blonde on Blonde, Dylan's seventh studio album, was issued as a double album on June 20, with "I Want You" as the first track on side two. The album version had a duration of three minutes and eight seconds. It was later included on Bob Dylan's Greatest Hits (1967). The recording session was released in its entirety on the 18-disc Collector's Edition of The Bootleg Series Vol. 12: The Cutting Edge 1965–1966 in 2015, with the penultimate take of the song also appearing on the 6-disc and 2-disc versions of that album.

The reviewer for Cash Box described the song as a "medium-paced, blues-soaked plea for romance with an infectious, repeating rhythmic riff" that it considered a "sure-fire blockbuster candidate." Billboard magazine recorded the release of "I Want You" in its June 25 issue, and predicted it would reach the Top 20. The track entered the Billboard Hot 100 charts on July 2, 1966, at number 90, and Billboard identified the single as a "star performer"—a side "registering greatest proportionate upward progress this week". It peaked at 20th on July 30. "I Want You" entered the Cash Box charts at number 59 on July 2, and was tipped for strong upward movement. It peaked at number 25 on August 6. It was also a hit in the UK, where it peaked at number 16.

Richard Goldstein of The Village Voice found that despite the "complex" imagery, the song should appeal to teenagers in Dylan's expanding fanbase as it expressed its subject in straightforward phrasing. Not all critics were positive. Craig McGregor of The Sydney Morning Herald found the song unremarkable, and Peter Murray's brief assessment was that the track was "rather disappointing".

In 2013, Jim Beviglia rated it as the 70th-best of Dylan's songs, and praised Dylan's "ingenious poetic techniques". Neil Spencer gave the song a rating of 5/5 stars in an Uncut magazine Dylan supplement in 2015. Highlighting Dylan's harmonica part and Wayne Moss's guitar, Dylan discography author John Nogowski gave the song an "A" rating.

== Live performances ==
Dylan first performed "I Want You" live in concert in 1973, accompanied by Neil Young and members of the Band, at a benefit concert for Students Need Athletic and Cultural Kicks (SNACK). Three years later, he performed it during the Rolling Thunder Revue, in a manner that journalist Oliver Trager called a "painful dirge." During his 1978 World Tour Dylan performed "I Want You" as a torch song, while in 1981 it appeared in his live performances in a more up-tempo version. After this, he next performed it during the Bob Dylan and the Grateful Dead 1987 Tour, with it remaining part of his live repertoire for the 1987 Temples in Flames Tour.

A 1978 performance, featuring Dylan accompanied by Steve Douglas on recorder, was released on the live album Bob Dylan at Budokan (1978). One of the performance with the Grateful Dead was issued on Dylan & the Dead (1989), and an incomplete rehearsal from 1975 was included on Bob Dylan – The Rolling Thunder Revue: The 1975 Live Recordings (2019). According to his official website, Dylan has performed the song live 294 times, from its debut to his most recent live rendition in 2005.

== Personnel ==
The track was written by Dylan. The credits below are adapted from That Thin, Wild Mercury Sound: Dylan, Nashville, and the Making of Blonde on Blonde.

Musicians

- Bob Dylan – vocals, acoustic guitar, harmonica
- Charlie McCoy – acoustic guitar
- Wayne Moss – electric guitar
- Al Kooper – organ
- Hargus "Pig" Robbins – piano
- Either Henry Strzelecki or Joe South – electric bass
- Kenneth Buttrey – drums

Technical

- Bob Johnston – record producer

== Sophie B. Hawkins version ==
"I Want You"

Single by Sophie B. Hawkins

from the album Tongues and Tails
- B-side: "Live and Let Love"
- Released: October 1992
- Length: 4:19
- Label: Columbia
- Songwriter: Bob Dylan
- Producers: Rick Chertoff; Ralph Schuckett

Sophie B. Hawkins singles chronology
| "California Here I Come" (1992) | "I Want You" (1992) | "Right Beside You" (1994) |

Music video
- "I Want You" on YouTube

American singer-songwriter Sophie B. Hawkins recorded "I Want You" for her April, 1992 debut album, Tongues and Tails, produced by Rick Chertoff and Ralph Schuckett, on Columbia records. Hawkins' version had a different melody and featured the vocals from her first take. Hawkins has said of Dylan's lyrics, "Each time I sing [the] song I struggle to grasp what the words are saying." She elaborated, "I completely feel the song, but I don't understand it." In Rolling Stone, Paul Evans described the style of her version as "breathy techno-MOR"; the Associated Press reviewer called it "quasi hip-hop".

Larry Flick, writing for Billboard, praised Hawkins' version for being "deliver[ed] with chatty finesse, amid a cushiony synth arrangement". Randy Clark, reviewing for Cash Box, noted that despite Dylan's "obvious lyrical/poetic style", Hawkins' "sultry performance style permeates the recording". Music & Media felt Hawkins "manages to completely transform the Bob Dylan classic" and noted it "sounds like Cyndi Lauper in a Sinéad O'Connor setting". Amongst the negative reviews, Adam Sweeting of The Guardian described Hawkins's vocals as a "cloisterish drone" where she attempted but failed to match Dylan's delivery, Richard Plunkett of The Age predicted that Dylan's fans would dislike the "quite bad" cover. The Associated Press review suggested that the idea for the cover should have been discarded, and anticipated that Dylan fans would be upset by the track.

Hawkins performed the song at Dylan's 30th Anniversary Concert Celebration at Madison Square Garden, New York City in October, 1992. Rolling Stone reviewer David Wild wrote that Hawkins's inclusion on the bill "struck some as a case of label boosterism", and Wayne Robins of Newsday felt that her performance was "superfluous", while Tom Moon characterised the performance as "listless" in The Philadelphia Inquirer. Hawkins' performance was one of a number of omissions from the 1993 double-album and VHS releases of the concert.

Issued as a single in the US in October 1992 and in the UK in January 1993, it reached No. 49 on the UK Singles Chart in February 1993. The single version had a duration of 4 minutes and 19 seconds, and was backed with "Live and Let Love" as the B-side. The accompanying music video, which was shot in Paris, was directed by Lydie Caller and produced by Odille DeVars.

== Charts ==
Bob Dylan single
| Chart (1966) | Peak position |
|---|---|
| Belgium (Ultratop 50 Flanders) | 12 |
| Canadian RPM Singles Chart | 24 |
| Netherlands (Dutch Top 40) | 24 |
| UK (OCC) | 16 |
| US Billboard Hot 100 | 20 |
| US Top 100 (Cashbox) | 25 |

Sophie B. Hawkins single
| Chart (1993) | Peak position |
|---|---|
| UK (OCC) | 49 |

== Notes ==
=== References ===
Citations

Books and journal articles

- Beviglia, Jim (2013). Counting Down Bob Dylan: His 100 Finest Songs. Lanham: Scarecrow Press. ISBN 978-0-8108-8824-1.
- Brown, Richard (1989). "'I Want You': Enigma and Kerygma in the Love Lyrics of Bob Dylan". In Massa, Ann (ed.). American Declarations Of Love. London: Palgrave Macmillan. pp. 174–194. doi:10.1007/978-1-349-20435-9. ISBN 978-1-349-20435-9.
- Dettmar, Kevin; Latham, Sean (2021). "A chronology of Bob Dylan's life". In Latham, Sean (ed.). The World of Bob Dylan. Cambridge: Cambridge University Press. pp. 13–19.
- Downey, Pat; Albert, George; Hoffman, Frank (1994). Cash Box pop singles charts, 1950–1993. Englewood: Libraries Unlimited. ISBN 978-1-56308-316-7.
- Edwards, Leigh H. (2021). "Country Music: Dylan, Cash, and the Projection of Authenticity". In Latham, Sean (ed.). The World of Bob Dylan. Cambridge: Cambridge University Press. pp. 100–111.
- Gill, Andy (1998). Classic Bob Dylan: My Back Pages. Carlton. ISBN 978-1-85868-599-1.
- Heine, Steven (2009). Bargainin' for salvation : Bob Dylan, a Zen master?. New York: Continuum. ISBN 978-0-8264-2950-6.
- Herren, Graley (2018). "Mythic Quest in Bob Dylan's Blonde on Blonde". Rock Music Studies. 5 (2): 124–141. doi:10.1080/19401159.2018.1446246. S2CID 194995653.
- Heylin, Clinton (2009). Revolution In The Air: The Songs of Bob Dylan, Volume One: 1957–73. Constable & Robinson. ISBN 978-1-84901-051-1.
- Heylin, Clinton (2016). Judas!: From Forest Hills to the Free Trade Hall: A Historical View of Dylan's Big Boo (Kindle ed.). Route Publishing. ISBN 978-1-901927-68-9.
- Heylin, Clinton (2021). The Double Life of Bob Dylan: A Restless, Hungry Feeling, 1941-1966. New York: Little, Brown and Company. ISBN 978-0-316-53523-6.
- Margotin, Philippe; Guesdon, Jean-Michel (2022). Bob Dylan All the Songs: The Story Behind Every Track (Expanded ed.). New York: Black Dog & Leventhal. ISBN 978-0-7624-7573-5.
- Marqusee, Mike (2005). Wicked Messenger: Bob Dylan and the 1960s. New York: Seven Stories Press. ISBN 978-1-58322-686-5.
- Mellers, Wilfrid (1985). A Darker Shade of Pale: A Backdrop to Bob Dylan. Oxford University Press. ISBN 978-0-571-13345-1.
- Nogowski, John (2022). Bob Dylan: A Descriptive, Critical Discography and Filmography, 1961-2022 (3rd ed.). Jefferson: McFarland & Company. ISBN 978-1-4766-4362-5.
- Sanders, Daryl (2020). That Thin, Wild Mercury Sound: Dylan, Nashville, and the Making of Blonde on Blonde (epub ed.). Chicago: Chicago Review Press. ISBN 978-1-61373-550-3.
- Starr, Larry (2021). Listening to Bob Dylan. Music in American Life (Kindle ed.). Urbana: University of Illinois Press. ISBN 978-0-252-05288-0.
- Trager, Oliver (2004). Keys to the Rain: the Definitive Bob Dylan Encyclopedia. New York: Billboard Books. ISBN 978-0-8230-7974-2.
- van Slooten, Johan (1998). Hit Dossier: 1939 tot 1998 (in Dutch) (7th ed.). Haarlem: Becht. ISBN 978-90-230-0974-0.
- Walters, Neal; Mansfield, Brian (1998). MusicHound Folk: The Essential Album Guide. Visible Ink Press.
- Whitburn, Joel (2013). Joel Whitburn's Top Pop Singles 1955–2012 (14th ed.). Menomonee Falls: Record Research. ISBN 978-0-89820-205-2.
- Wilentz, Sean (2009). Bob Dylan In America. The Bodley Head. ISBN 978-1-84792-150-5.

Radio documentary

- Gilliland, John (1969). "Show 40 - Ballad in Plain D: Bob Dylan. [1966]" (audio). Pop Chronicles. University of North Texas Libraries.
