= Tongues and Tails =

Studio album by Sophie B. Hawkins
- Released: April 21, 1992
- Recorded: July 1991 – February 1992
- Studios: Electric Lady, Messina, and New Breed (New York City, New York)
- Length: 52:23
- Label: Columbia
- Producers: Rick Chertoff; Ralph Schuckett

Sophie B. Hawkins chronology
Tongues and Tails (1992)	Whaler (1994)

Singles from Tongues and Tails
- 1. "Damn I Wish I Was Your Lover" Released: 31 March 1992; 2. "California Here I Come" Released: July 1992; 3. "I Want You" Released: October 1992

Tongues and Tails is the debut album by American singer-songwriter Sophie B. Hawkins, released in 1992 on Columbia records. It was produced by Rick Chertoff and Ralph Schuckett.

The album contains ten original tracks, including "Damn I Wish I Was Your Lover" and "California Here I Come", and a cover of Bob Dylan's "I Want You"; in Rolling Stone, Paul Evans described the style of her version as "breathy techno-MOR".

The album, which sold over 850,000 units worldwide, was a commercial and critical success. It was awarded "Best Pop Album" and "Best Debut Album by a Solo Artist" at the 1992 New York Music Awards, and earned Hawkins a Grammy Award nomination for Best New Artist in 1993.

== Background ==
Hawkins recorded her debut album, Tongues and Tails, after signing a contract with Columbia Records, who had liked a demo tape she circulated to various labels. She was enthusiastic about her relationship with the label, telling Billboard in 1992, "Once it sunk into my brain that I got this deal because [Columbia] believed in me and my music, I was able to dig into making this album without any inhibitions."

== Singles ==
The lead single, "Damn I Wish I Was Your Lover", preceded the album and was released in the US on March 31, 1992. It achieved success in many countries worldwide; in the United States, it reached number five on the Billboard Hot 100. The second single, "California Here I Come", was released in July 1992. It failed to appear on any Billboard charts, but did peak at number 79 on the US Cash Box Top 100 Pop Singles chart. "I Want You" was issued as the third and final single in October 1992, but was not a chart success. It did, however, reach number 49 on the UK Singles Chart in February 1993.

== Critical reception ==
Professional ratings
Review scores
Source	Rating
AllMusic	4/5 stars
Robert Christgau	(dud)
The Encyclopedia of Popular Music	4/5 stars
Entertainment Weekly	B+
The Indianapolis Star	3/4 stars
Los Angeles Times	3/4 stars
Orlando Sentinel	1/3 stars
Q	(1992) (1994)
Rolling Stone	3/5 stars
Slant Magazine	5/5 stars

Billboard believed that Tongues and Tails "distinguishes itself from the femme-fronted confessional genre by contrasting sensitive lyrics with insinuating pop grooves, '70s soul stylings, and African-tribal percussion". They added that Hawkins "reveals a unique voice and charisma that's well worth the attention." Kent Zimmerman of Gavin Report described the album as "one of this year's prime releases". He noted how Hawkins has "carved a personality niche right alongside her textured and keyboard-drive recordings", which "emphasizes sex and affection during dangerous times". The Indianapolis Star stated that "Hawkins' music ranges from churchlike keyboards to what should be instant favorites on the dance floor—sort of an early Springsteen to current Madonna." Sal Cinquemani of Slant Magazine praised the album writing it's "sonically intricate and emotionally raw, it's about as complex as pop music gets." In 2003, Slant Magazine included it on their list of 50 Essential Pop Albums.

== Track listing ==
All tracks written by Sophie B. Hawkins, except "I Want You," written by Bob Dylan.

1. "Damn I Wish I Was Your Lover" – 5:23
2. "California Here I Come" – 4:38
3. "Mysteries We Understand" – 4:40
4. "Savior Child" – 4:45
5. "Carry Me" – 4:36
6. "I Want You" – 5:19
7. "Before I Walk on Fire" – 4:58
8. "We Are One Body" – 4:49
9. "Listen" – 3:31
10. "Live and Let Love" – 4:13
11. "Don't Stop Swaying" – 5:31

== Personnel ==
Musicians

- Sophie B. Hawkins – vocals, keyboards
- Ralph Schuckett – keyboards
- Peter Wood – additional synthesizers
- Roger Greenawalt – acoustic 12-string guitar (1)
- Eric Bazilian – guitars
- Rick DiFonzo – guitars
- Gary Lucas – guitars
- Mark Egan – bass
- Omar Hakim – drums
- Mino Cinelu – percussion
- Café – additional percussion
- Sammy Merendino – rhythm collage
- Frederick Zlotkin – cello

Production

- Ralph Schuckett – producer
- Rick Chertoff – producer
- Steve Churchyard – recording, mixing
- David Leonard – mixing (1)
- John Agnello – additional engineer
- Martin Brass – additional engineer
- Stewart Lerman – additional engineer
- Ted Trewhella – assistant engineer
- Michael White – assistant engineer
- George Marino – mastering at Sterling Sound (New York, NY)
- Michele Galman – A&R coordinator
- Christopher Austopchuk – art direction
- Nicky Lindeman – art direction
- David LaChapelle – photography
- Sophie B. Hawkins – paintings

== Charts ==
Chart performance for Tongues and Tails
Chart (1992)	Peak position
Australian Albums (ARIA)	38
Canada Top Albums/CDs (RPM)	20
European Top 100 Albums (Music & Media)	54
German Albums (Offizielle Top 100)	34
Norwegian Albums (VG-lista)	13
Swedish Albums (Sverigetopplistan)	38
Swiss Albums (Schweizer Hitparade)	15
UK Albums (Official Charts)	46
US Billboard 200	51
US Cash Box Top 200 Pop Albums	32
