= Damn I Wish I Was Your Lover =

1992 single by Sophie B. Hawkins

Single by Sophie B. Hawkins

from the album Tongues and Tails
- B-side: "Don't Stop Swaying"; "Listen"
- Released: March 31, 1992
- Genre: Rock
- Length: 5:23 (album version); 4:08 (radio and video edit)
- Label: Columbia
- Songwriter: Sophie B. Hawkins
- Producers: Rick Chertoff; Ralph Schuckett

Sophie B. Hawkins singles chronology
"Damn I Wish I Was Your Lover" (1992)	"California Here I Come" (1992)

Music video
- "Damn I Wish I Was Your Lover" on YouTube

"Damn I Wish I Was Your Lover" is a song written and performed by American singer-songwriter Sophie B. Hawkins and produced by Rick Chertoff and Ralph Schuckett. Released in March 1992 by Columbia Records as the first single from Hawkins's debut album, Tongues and Tails (1992), the song achieved success in many countries worldwide; in the United States, it reached number five on both the Billboard Hot 100 and Cash Box Top 100. It also reached the top 10 in six other countries, including Canada, Denmark, New Zealand and Norway. In the United Kingdom, the single peaked at number 14 on the UK Singles Chart. Two different versions of the music video were made for the song after the first version was banned by MTV for its erotic content.

== Background and composition ==
The song's lyrics are written from the perspective of a woman who is observing another woman in an abusive relationship. Hawkins has said the song "really is my life story", and that the first line (“That old dog has chained you up all night") was triggered by events in her childhood and the people she was hanging out with. Hawkins in an 2008 interview identified as "omnisexual"; the homoerotic nature of the song was in 1992 and it was not picked up on by a large group of listeners.

== Critical reception ==
Roch Parisien from AllMusic described the song as "hook-filled mainstream pop". Upon the release, Larry Flick from Billboard magazine wrote, "Hawkins proves to be a star-in-the-making, delivering a charming vocal over a hypnotic, rock/hip-hop beat. Contagious, sing-along chorus renders tune an unlikely anthem, but one that deserves every bit of airplay it gets." Clark and DeVaney from Cash Box felt the singer-songwriter "has a sexy, breathy and slightly vulnerable sound". Stephanie Zacharek from Entertainment Weekly remarked that in the "killer single" "Damn I Wish I Was Your Lover", "Hawkins says those words as insouciantly as if she’d just broken a nail. But she still lets you know they mean a hell of a lot more to her than that." Dave Sholin from the Gavin Report stated, "When 1992 is done and gone, we'll likely remember the debut of this singer/songwriter from New York City's Upper West Side as one of the year's musical highlights." He added, "It's not often when programmer consensus is this strong on a new song by an unknown artist, but in this case, it's totally justified. It's one of those that is instantly obvious seconds after it starts."

Pan-European magazine Music & Media said, "Listen to the extremely strong chorus to this pop song, and you'll understand why." Alan Jones from Music Week named it Pick of the Week, writing, "Brooklyn babe's self-penned multi-textured and multi-format debut is a compelling confection. Soulfully shuffling and coyly chiming, it's armed with a killer hook, and knows it. A curious early fade threatens, before Sophie builds it up again." A reviewer from People Magazine noted, "When a record opens with a song called 'Damn I Wish I Was Your Lover', you realize immediately you're not dealing with some delicate flower. Hawkins knows what she wants, and she knows how to get it." In a retrospective review, Pop Rescue stated that "this is a wonderfully breathy song which builds well in the chorus and adds more instruments into the second verse." Jonathan Bernstein from Spin wrote, "Not only was her lubricious lament, 'Damn I Wish I Was Your Lover', the year's stand-alone Great White Pop Single, but it neatly supplanted 'I'm Too Sexy' as the phrase on the nation's lips."

== Music video ==
The original music video for the song featured Hawkins lying on her back in a flowing, light-fabric outfit while singing the song, interspersed with scenes of dancers and of Hawkins kneeling down while wearing a combination of a tube top and daisy dukes. At the time, television network MTV refused to air the original version for its erotic content. In response, a new video was shot, showing Hawkins in jeans and a flannel shirt, performing the song on a stage together with a band. While the new video was shot entirely in black and white, a significant portion of the original video was in colour (though there were scenes in black and white as well, with some artificial colouring used to artistically enhance the material). A portion of this original video is shown in the documentary The Cream Will Rise.

== Impact and legacy ==
Slant Magazine listed "Damn I Wish I Was Your Lover" at number 100 in their ranking of "The 100 Best Singles of the 1990s" in 2011, writing,

Sophie B. Hawkins's debut single starts off discreetly enough, with the sound of New York City's underground, the soft shuffle of a drum loop, and an opening line worthy of Prince: "That old dog has chained you up all right." Prince, in fact, could have written the song himself, except Hawkins took the sentiment of songs like the Purple One's 'I Wanna Be Your Lover' to grittier, even ballsier territory. One part Led Zeppelin, one part Rolling Stones, and a whole lot of female fortitude, 'Damn I Wish I Was Your Lover' was the most tenacious unrequited-love song of the decade—or maybe ever."

Time Out placed it at number 45 in their list of "The 50 Best Gay Songs to Celebrate Pride All Year Long" in 2022.

== Track listings ==
- US CD and cassette single
- Australian CD and cassette single
- Japanese mini-CD single
1. "Damn I Wish I Was Your Lover" – 5:21
2. "Don't Stop Swaying" – 5:32
- UK and European 7-inch single
- European CD single

A. "Damn I Wish I Was Your Lover" (radio edit) – 4:08
B. "Don't Stop Swaying" – 5:32

- UK CD single
1. "Damn I Wish I Was Your Lover" (radio version) – 4:08
2. "Damn I Wish I Was Your Lover" (long version) – 5:22
3. "Listen" – 3:31
4. "Don't Stop Swaying" – 5:32
- UK 12-inch single

A1. "Damn I Wish I Was Your Lover" (long version) – 5:22
B1. "Listen" – 3:31
B2. "Don't Stop Swaying" – 5:32

- European maxi-CD single
1. "Damn I Wish I Was Your Lover" (radio edit) – 4:08
2. "Don't Stop Swaying" – 5:32
3. "Listen" – 3:32
- European 12-inch single

A1. "Damn I Wish I Was Your Lover" (radio edit) – 4:08
A2. "Don't Stop Swaying" – 5:32
B1. "Listen" – 3:32
B2. "Damn I Wish I Was Your Lover" (album version) – 5:23

== Personnel ==
- Mixed by David Leonard and Steve Churchyard
- Produced by Ralph Schuckett and Rick Chertoff
- Eric Bazilian guitar.

== Charts ==
=== Weekly charts ===
Chart (1992–1993)	Peak position
Australia (ARIA)	7
Canada Top Singles (RPM)	5
Canada Adult Contemporary (RPM)	37
Denmark (IFPI)	5
Europe (Eurochart Hot 100)	26
France (SNEP)	45
Germany (GfK)	15
Greece (Virgin)	8
Ireland (IRMA)	17
Netherlands (Dutch Top 40)	32
Netherlands (Single Top 100)	26
New Zealand (Recorded Music NZ)	4
Norway (VG-lista)	3
Sweden (Sverigetopplistan)	12
Switzerland (Schweizer Hitparade)	11
UK Singles (Official Charts)	14
UK Airplay (Music Week)	10
US Billboard Hot 100	5
US Adult Contemporary (Billboard)	39
US Cash Box Top 100	5

=== Year-end charts ===
Chart (1992)	Position
Australia (ARIA)	18
Canada Top Singles (RPM)	32
Europe (Eurochart Hot 100)	85
Europe (European Hit Radio)	27
Germany (Media Control)	61
New Zealand (RIANZ)	37
Sweden (Topplistan)	61
UK Airplay (Music Week)	73
US Billboard Hot 100	34
US Cash Box Top 100	17

== Certifications ==
Region	Certification	Certified units/sales
Australia (ARIA)	Gold	35,000^{^}
^{^} Shipments figures based on certification alone.

== Release history ==
Region	Date	Format(s)	Label(s)	Ref.
United States	March 31, 1992	Radio	Columbia	
Australia	April 20, 1992	CD; cassette	Columbia	
Japan	May 21, 1992	Mini-CD	Sony	
United Kingdom	June 15, 1992	7-inch vinyl; 12-inch vinyl; CD; cassette	Columbia	
