= Sophie B. Hawkins =

American singer

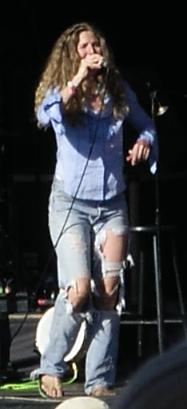
- Hawkins in 2006

Background information
- Born: Sophie Ballantine Hawkins; November 1, 1964 (age 62); New York City, New York, U.S.
- Genres: Adult contemporary; jazz; pop; rock; world
- Occupations: Singer, songwriter
- Instruments: Vocals, guitar, piano, keyboards, drums
- Years active: 1990–present
- Labels: Sony BMG; Columbia; Rykodisc; Trumpet Swan
- Website: sophiebhawkins.com

Sophie Ballantine Hawkins (born November 1, 1964) is an American singer-songwriter. Born in New York City, she attended the Manhattan School of Music for a year as a percussionist before leaving to pursue a music career. In the 1990s, she achieved critical and commercial success with her first two albums, producing a string of single hits including "Damn I Wish I Was Your Lover", "Right Beside You", and "As I Lay Me Down". A dispute with her record label Sony Music over her third album, Timbre, led her to establish her own independent label, Trumpet Swan Productions, which has published her subsequent recordings.

Hawkins is a long-time supporter of animal rights and environmental causes. She is also a social and political activist, supporting events promoting women in music and LGBTQ rights.

== Career ==
Hawkins's debut album, Tongues and Tails, was released in 1992. It achieved both worldwide commercial success and critical acclaim, earning her a Grammy Award nomination for Best New Artist in 1993. The single "Damn I Wish I Was Your Lover" went to number 5 on the Billboard Hot 100 singles chart in the US and was also a Top 20 hit in the UK, peaking at number 14. Hawkins was asked to perform Bob Dylan's "I Want You", which she had covered on Tongues and Tails, for the 1992 Madison Square Garden concert honoring Dylan's 30th anniversary as a musician; this was later released as The 30th Anniversary Concert Celebration, but her performance was omitted.

Whaler, her second album, was released in 1994. Produced by Stephen Lipson, it also contained a US top 10 hit, "As I Lay Me Down", and was certified gold. Three singles from the album made the UK Top 40, including "Right Beside You", which peaked at number 13. The same year, Hawkins posed nude for Interview. As she explained to Ed Rampell in an interview for Q magazine, she met the photographer, Bruce Weber, and was asked if she would do a photoshoot with him. While she had provided her own clothes, Weber deliberately had her wear an unflattering dress as part of his plan to convince Hawkins to disrobe during the shoot.

A 1998 documentary by Gigi Gaston, The Cream Will Rise, followed Hawkins during one of her tours and captured her struggle to deal with past troubles with her family, including her mother and brother. Music by Hawkins was included throughout the film.

Also in 1998, Hawkins's record company, Sony Music, delayed the release of her third album. Its executives were unhappy with the finished product and wanted Hawkins to rework some of the material. In particular, they insisted that Hawkins remove a banjo track from one of the songs. Unwilling to compromise her artistic integrity, Hawkins refused to accommodate them. After a lengthy battle between Hawkins and the company, the album, Timbre, was eventually released in 1999, though Sony declined to promote it. Hawkins subsequently left the label and founded her own label, Trumpet Swan Productions. In 2001, Timbre was re-released on Hawkins's label, now as a two-disc set that contained new songs, demos, remixes, and videos. Her first independently recorded and released album, Wilderness, was released in 2004.

In 2012, Hawkins starred as Janis Joplin in the play, Room 105, which was written and directed by her longtime girlfriend and manager, Gigi Gaston. After another long hiatus, she released her fifth album of all-new material in 2012, titled The Crossing.

On April 4, 2013, Hawkins appeared as herself on the TV series Community in the episode "Herstory of Dance", performing "Damn I Wish I Was Your Lover" and "As I Lay Me Down" during the community college's "Sophie B. Hawkins Dance," so named because the character “Britta” confused her with Susan B. Anthony in an attempt to compete with a Sadie Hawkins Dance.

In 2019, Hawkins completed a sold-out tour around the U.S.; the same year she also appeared on the German TV show Night Grooves, singing several songs, discussing her past, and showing off her drumming talent.

== Personal life ==
Hawkins has two children, Dashiell (b. 2008) and Esther Ballantine (b. 2015). Esther had been conceived 20 years earlier and frozen as an embryo.

In an interview with Howard Stern, Hawkins said that she identified as omnisexual. Although there were rumors she had dated Martina Navratilova and Jodie Foster, she denied those, saying, "I've never met any of the women I'm supposed to have had affairs with."

In 2012, Hawkins and Gigi Gaston shared a house in Venice, California. By 2014, they had separated.

=== Politics ===
In August 2007, Hawkins headlined the first Los Angeles Women's Music Festival in support of its dual agenda of supporting animal rescue groups and promoting and supporting female musicians. Hawkins is a long-time supporter of animal rights.

In February 2008, Hawkins re-recorded her song "Damn I Wish I Was Your Lover" as "Damn, We Wish You Were President" in support of presidential candidate Hillary Clinton. Hawkins also wrote in her blog, "Hillary Clinton's achievements come from her heart. She has initiated so much positive change for families, children, victims of crime and the environment in her struggle for the forward movement of America and the working people of this nation."

In May 2010, Hawkins began supporting Waterkeeper Alliance, an organization of on-the-water advocates who patrol and protect more than 100,000 miles of rivers, streams and coastlines in North and South America, Europe, Australia, Asia and Africa. She donated all of the proceeds of her single "The Land, the Sea, and the Sky" to the organization.

In February 2011, Hawkins performed at the Big Gay Party event staged by GOProud, an organization of gay conservatives, as part of the year's Conservative Political Action Conference festivities. In an after-show interview in the reason.tv documentary "Liberal in Bed, Conservative in the Head: Sophie B. Hawkins", Hawkins gave her views on issues such as gun ownership, the free market, limited government and identity politics.

In 2017, Hawkins lent her voice in support of LGBTQ youth suicide prevention organization The Trevor Project's 20th Anniversary celebration video campaign.

== Awards and nominations ==
Year	Awards	Work	Category	Result	Ref.
1993	Grammy Awards	Herself	Best New Artist	Nominated	
1993	Q Awards	Herself	Best New Act	Nominated	
1995	RSH Gold Awards	Herself	Kraftrille des Jahres	Won	
1995	Cash Box Year-End Awards	"As I Lay Me Down"	Top Pop Single	Nominated	
1996	ASCAP Pop Music Awards	"As I Lay Me Down"	Most Performed Song	Won	
1996	APRA Music Awards	"As I Lay Me Down"	Most Performed Foreign Work	Nominated	

== Discography ==
- Tongues and Tails (1992)
- Whaler (1994)
- Timbre (1999)
- Wilderness (2004)
- The Crossing (2012)
- Free Myself (2023)

== Filmography ==
- The Cream Will Rise (1998) dir. Gigi Gaston
- Beyond the City Limits (Rip It Off) (2001) dir. Gigi Gaston
- Community episode "Herstory of Dance" (2013)
