= Donna De Lory discography =

American singer and songwriter Donna De Lory

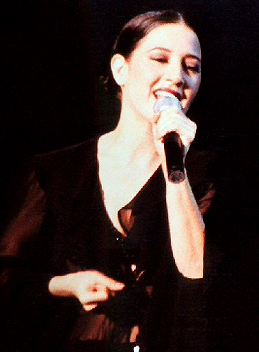
- Donna De Lory performing "Rain" alongside Madonna and Niki Haris in 1993.
- Studio albums: 12
- EPs: 10
- Live albums: 2
- Singles: 31
- Music videos: 24
- Remix albums: 4
- Promotional singles: 3

The American singer and songwriter Donna De Lory has released eleven studio albums (including one with other artists), five extended plays (EPs), two live albums, four remix albums, 25 singles (including two as a featured artist), three promotional singles and seven music videos.

== Studio albums ==
Title	Album details
Donna DeLory	Released: 1992; Label: MCA; Format: Cassette · CD · LP
Bliss	Released: September 19, 2000; Label: Secret Road; Format: CD
Songs 95	Released: 2002; Label: Secret Road; Format: CD
In the Glow	Released: November 26, 2003; Label: Self-released; Format: CD
The Lover & the Beloved	Released: January 31, 2004; Label: Ajna Music; Format: CD · digital download
Sky Is Open	Released: July 19, 2006; Label: Self-released; Format: CD · digital download
Sanctuary	Released: March 24, 2009; Label: Nuotone; Format: CD · digital download
The Unchanging	Released: July 24, 2013; Label: Self-released; Format: CD · digital download
Elixir: Songs of the Radiance Sutras (with Dave Stringer and Joni Allen)	Released: February 24, 2015; Label: Sounds True; Format: CD · digital download
Here in Heaven	Released: May 11, 2018; Label: Self-released; Format: CD · digital download
Gone Beyond	Released: September 10, 2021; Label: Self-released; Format: Digital download
Sing To The Light	Released: August 23, 2024; Label: Self-released; Format: Digital download

== Minor releases ==
=== Extended plays ===
Title	Album details
A Sampler (Note: A Sampler is an advanced sampler EP of Donna DeLory featuring three songs: "Praying for Love", "Think It Over", and "Shiny Red World".)	Released: 1992; Label: MCA; Format: CD
Sky Is Open EP	Released: December 17, 2008; Label: Self-released; Format: Digital download
Rain Remixed (with Niki Haris)	Released: October 6, 2016; Label: Self-released; Format: Digital download
Two Friends (with Niki Haris)	Released: October 27, 2017; Label: Self-released; Format: CD · digital download
We Shine	Released: April 23, 2021; Label: Self-released; Format: Digital download
I Know You, I Live You (with Niki Haris & Tracy Young)	Released: July 25, 2025; Label: Ferosh Records; Format: Digital download
WATR (with Niki Haris & Tracy Young)	Released: November 14, 2025; Label: Ferosh Records; Format: Digital download
Chakra Meditation	Released: January 23, 2026; Label: Self-released; Format: Digital download
WATR: Reimagined! (with Niki Haris & Tracy Young)	Released: March 13, 2026; Label: Ferosh Records; Format: Digital download
Just A Dream (Remixes)	Released: March 18, 2026; Label: Self-released; Format: Digital download

=== Live albums ===
Title	Album details
Live & Acoustic	Released: 2002; Label: Secret Road; Format: CD
Live from Kula Space	Released: April 14, 2016; Label: Self-released; Format: Digital download

=== Remix albums ===
Title	Album details
The Lover & the Beloved: Radio/DJ Mix	Released: September 16, 2004; Label: Ajna Music; Format: CD · digital download
Remixes	Released: November 9, 2010; Label: Self-released; Format: CD · digital download
Universal Light	Released: March 5, 2015; Label: Self-released; Format: CD · digital download · streaming
Here in Heaven (Remixes and Bonus Tracks)	Released: July 31, 2020; Label: Self-released; Format: CD · digital download · streaming

== Singles ==
=== As lead artist ===
List of singles as lead artist, with selected chart positions, showing year released and album name
Title	Year	Peak chart positions			Album
Title	Year	US Dance	US Dance Singles	UK	Album
"Luck Is an Angel"	1989	—	—	—	Non-album single
"Praying for Love"	1992	—	—	—	Donna DeLory
"Just a Dream"	1993	10	17	71	Donna DeLory
"Think It Over"	1993	—	—	—	Donna DeLory
"On and On"	2000	17	—	—	Bliss
"When You Loved Me"	2008	—	—	—	Sky Is Open EP
"My Sweet Lord"	2013	—	—	—	The Unchanging
"The Unchanging"	2014	—	—	—	The Unchanging
"Be the Change"	2015	—	—	—	The Unchanging
"Rain" (with Niki Haris)	2016	—	—	—	Non-album single
"All Through the Night" (with Niki Haris)	2018	—	—	—	Two Friends
"Listen"	2019	—	—	—	Here in Heaven
"Heaven"	2019	—	—	—	Here in Heaven
"Go Talk to Mary"	2019	—	—	—	Here in Heaven
"Miracle of Love"	2019	—	—	—	Here in Heaven
"Diamonds in the Sun (We Shine)"	2020	—	—	—	Here in Heaven
"Sat Siri" (featuring Belinda Carlisle)	2020	—	—	—	Non-album singles
"I Know You I Live You" (with Niki Haris)	2021	—	—	—	Non-album singles
"So Hum / Breathing In"	2021	—	—	—	Gone Beyond
"Forgiveness Prayer"	2022	—	—	—	Gone Beyond
"Om Gate Gate Paragate"	2022	—	—	—	Gone Beyond
"Unbreakable"	2023	—	—	—	Gone Beyond
"One"	2023	—	—	—	Non-album singles
"Silent Night"	2024	—	—	—	Non-album singles
"Ma Song"	2025	—	—	—	Gone Beyond
"Asatoma Sadgamaya"	2025	—	—	—	Gone Beyond
"Ra Ma Da Sa"	2025	—	—	—	Non-album singles
"Chakra Flow" (with DJ Taz Rashid)	2026	—	—	—	Non-album singles
"World Hold On" (with DJ Taz Rashid)	2026	—	—	—	Non-album singles
"Breathe" (with DJ Taz Rashid)	2026	—	—	—	Non-album singles
"Rainbow"	2026	—	—	—	Non-album singles
"—" denotes a recording that did not chart or was not released in that territory.

=== As a featured artist ===
List of singles as lead artist, with selected chart positions, showing year released and album name
Title	Year	Peak chart positions	Album
Title	Year	US Dance	Album
"The Hurting" (Mac Quayle featuring Donna De Lory)	2003	8	A Current Selection
"Wish You Were Here" (La Machine de Rêve featuring Donna De Lory)	2020	—	Welcome to the Dream Machine
"Last Night A DJ Saved My Life" (with Niki Haris & Tracy Young)	2025	—	Non-album single
"WATR" (with Niki Haris & Tracy Young)	2025	—	WATR (EP)

=== Promotional singles ===
List of promotional singles
Title	Year	Album
"Energy" (Note: "Energy" was released under the stage name Donna.)	1984	Non-album singles
"Only You Tonight"	1987	Non-album singles
"Where I've Never Been"	2001	Bliss

== Music videos ==
List of music videos, with directors, showing year released
Title	Year	Director(s)
"Praying for Love"	1993	Unknown
"Just a Dream"	1993	Jonathan Teplitzky
"Sky Is Open"	2008	Unknown
"The Unchanging"	2014	Nick Spanos
"Steam Train" (with La Machine de Rêve)	2017	Unknown
"Open Your Heart" (with La Machine de Rêve)	2017	Unknown
"Listen"	2018	Nick Spanos
"Piano Man"	2018	Nick Spanos
"Go Talk to Mary"	2019	Nick Spanos
"Heaven"	2019	Nick Spanos
"Temporary" (with La Machine de Rêve)	2019	Unknown
"Red Twilight" (with La Machine de Rêve)	2019	Unknown
"Miracle of Love"	2019	Nick Spanos
"Sat Siri" (with Belinda Carlisle))	2020	Nick Spanos
"Heaven Meditation"	2021	Nick Spanos
"A Living Prayer"	2021	Nick Spanos
"Two Secrets"	2021	Unknown
"Diamonds in the Sun (We Shine)"	2021	Unknown
"Ma Song"	2021	Nick Spanos
"So Hum/Breathing In"	2022	Nick Spanos
"Kinder (Yoga Chill Mix)" (feat. Niki Haris and Tina Malia)	2023	Nick Spanos
"Say I Love You" (with James Harrah)	2025	Nick Spanos
"Om Tare Tuttare (Radiant Mix)" (with DJ Taz Rashid)	2026	Jo Nagle
"Rainbow (Atom Smith Mix)"	2026	Devon Gummersall
