= Lokaksema =

Lokaksema (lit. 'people well-being') may refer to:

- Lokaksema (Hindu prayer), a reference in Hindu prayers
- Lokaksema (Buddhist monk), a 2nd-century Indian Buddhist monk
