= The Unchanging =

Studio album by Donna De Lory
- Released: July 24, 2013
- Length: 54:32
- Label: Self-released
- Producer: Donna De Lory; Mac Quayle

Donna De Lory chronology
Sanctuary (2009)	The Unchanging (2013)	Elixir: Songs of the Radiance Sutras (2015)

Singles from The Unchanging
- 1. "My Sweet Lord" Released: April 3, 2013; 2. "The Unchanging" Released: July 18, 2014; 3. "Be the Change" Released: July 18, 2015

The Unchanging is the eighth studio album by American singer and songwriter Donna de Lory, independently released on July 24, 2013. De Lory dedicated the album to her late father, Al De Lory: "I'm honoring him with this album. It’s about how my father’s death affected my whole spiritual path.” The Unchanging includes a version of De Lory's 1992 single "Praying for Love", which was featured on her eponymous debut album.

De Lory's cover of George Harrison's "My Sweet Lord" was released as the album's lead single on April 3, 2013. The Atom Smith remix of the album's title track became the second single from the album, when it was sent out for radio airplay on July 18, 2014. The final single from The Unchanging is "Be the Change", which was released as a digital single on July 18, 2015.

== Track listing ==
The Unchanging – Standard edition
No.	Title	Writer(s)	Producer(s)	Length
1.	"Gayatri Mantra"	Donna De Lory; Cameron Stone	De Lory; Mac Quayle	5:17
2.	"The Offering"	De Lory; Stone	De Lory; Quayle	5:11
3.	"Be the Change"	De Lory; Stone; Dave Allen	De Lory; Quayle	4:26
4.	"Kinder"	Cooper Wimmin	De Lory	2:10
5.	"The Unchanging"	De Lory; David Newman	De Lory	6:14
6.	"My Sweet Lord"	George Harrison	De Lory; Quayle	4:39
7.	"Praying for Love"	De Lory; Paul Gordon	De Lory; Quayle	5:20
8.	"Amma"	De Lory	De Lory	6:27
9.	"Amazing Grace"	John Newton; De Lory; Stone	De Lory	6:56
10.	"Luciana"	De Lory	De Lory	5:22
11.	"Life Without Boundaries"	Thích Nhất Hạnh	De Lory	2:30
Total length:				54:32
