= Shanti Mantras =

Hindu prayers for peace

The Shanti Mantras, or Pancha Shanti mantras, are Hindu prayers for peace (shanti) found in the Upanishads. Generally, they are recited at the beginning and end of religious rituals and discourses.

Shanti Mantras are invoked in the beginning of some topics of the Upanishads. They are believed to calm the mind and the environment of the reciter.

Shanti Mantras always end with the sacred syllable om (auṃ) and three utterances of the word "shanti", which means "peace". The reason for the three utterances is regarded to be for the removal of obstacles in the following three realms:

- The physical or ādhibhautika realm can be a source of obstacles coming from the external world, such as from wild animals, people, natural calamities.
- The divine or ādhidaivika realm can be a source of obstacles coming from the extra-sensory world of spirits, ghosts, deities and demigods.
- The internal or ādhyātmika realm is a source of obstacles arising out of one's own body and mind, such as pain, diseases, laziness and absent-mindedness.

These are called tāpatraya, or the three classes of obstacles.

These are the Shanti Mantras from the different Upanishads and other sources.

== Isha and Brihadaranyaka Upanishad ==
Devanagari

ॐ पूर्णमदः पूर्णमिदम् पूर्णात् पूर्णमुदच्यते |
पूर्णस्य पूर्णमादाय पूर्णमेवावशिष्यते ||
ॐ शान्तिः शान्तिः शान्तिः ||

Roman transliteration

oṃ pūrṇam adaḥ pūrṇam idam pūrṇāt pūrṇam udacyate
pūrṇasya pūrṇam ādāya pūrṇam evāvaśiṣyate
oṃ śāntiḥ śāntiḥ śāntiḥ

English translation

Om! That is infinite (Atman), and this (universe) is infinite.
The infinite proceeds from the infinite.
(Then) taking the infinitude from the infinite (universe),
It remains as the infinite (Brahman) alone.
Om! Peace! Peace! Peace!

The translation and meaning of the Mantra can be understood when the context in which the Mantra is quoted in the Upanishad is known. Prior understanding of Vedanta is essential for translation and explanation of these Mantra. The Brihadaranyaka Upanishad explains Consciousness and it in this context that this Shanti Mantra needs to be understood.

== Taittiriya Upanishad ==
Devanagari

ॐ शं नो मित्रः शं वरुणः।
शं नो भवत्वर्यमा।
शं न इन्द्रो बृहस्पतिः।
शं नो विष्णुरुरुक्रमः।
नमो ब्रह्मणे।
नमस्ते वायो।
त्वमेव प्रत्यक्षं ब्रह्मासि।
त्वामेव प्रत्यक्षम् ब्रह्म वदिष्यामि।
ॠतं वदिष्यामि।
सत्यं वदिष्यामि।
तन्मामवतु।
तद्वक्तारमवतु।
अवतु माम्।
अवतु वक्तारम्।
ॐ शान्तिः शान्तिः शान्तिः॥

Roman transliteration

Oṃ śaṃ no mitraḥ śaṃ varuṇaḥ |
śaṃ no bhavatv aryamā |
śaṃ na indro bṛhaspatiḥ |
śaṃ no viṣṇur urukramaḥ |
namo brahmaṇe |
namaste vāyo |
tvam eva pratyakṣaṃ bhrahmāsi |
tvām eva pratyakṣam brahma vadiṣyāmi |
ṝtaṃ vadiṣyāmi |
satyaṃ vadiṣyāmi |
tan mām avatu |
tad vaktāram avatu |
avatu mām |
avatu vaktāram |
Oṃ śāntiḥ śāntiḥ śāntiḥ ||

English translation

Om May Mitra be blissful to us.
May Varuna be blissful to us.
May Aryaman be blissful to us.
May Indra and Brihaspati be blissful to us.
May Vishnu, of long strides, be blissful to us.
Salutation to Brahman.
Salutation to you, O Vayu.
You, indeed, are the immediate Brahman.
You alone I shall call the direct Brahman.
I shall call you righteousness. I shall call you truth.
May He protect me.
May He protect the reciter*.
May He protect me.
May He protect the reciter.
Om, peace, peace, peace!

* Reciter = the one who is currently reciting this mantra. Identifying oneself here as "the reciter", and not as "I", is a sign of self-realization, of transcending beyond self and ego being dissolved.

== Taittiriya and Katha Upanishad ==
Devanagari

ॐ सह नाववतु |
सह नौ भुनक्तु |
सह वीर्यं करवावहै |
तेजस्विनावधीतमस्तु मा विद्विषावहै॥
ॐ शान्तिः शान्तिः शान्तिः॥

Roman transliteration

Oṃ saha nāv avatu
saha nau bhunaktu
saha vīryaṃ karavāvahai
tejasvi nāv adhītam astu
mā vidviṣāvahai |
Oṃ śāntiḥ śāntiḥ śāntiḥ ||

English translation

Om! May God protect us both together;
May God nourish us both together;
May we work conjointly with great energy;
May our study be vigorous and effective,
and may we not mutually dispute (or may we not hate any);
Om! Let there be peace in me! Let there be peace in my environment! Let there be peace in the forces that act on me!

== Kena and Chandogya Upanishads ==
Devanagari

ॐ आप्यायन्तु ममाङ्गानि वाक्प्राणश्चक्षुः
श्रोत्रमथो बलमिन्द्रियाणि च सर्वाणि।
सर्वम् ब्रह्मोपनिषदम् माऽहं ब्रह्म
निराकुर्यां मा मा ब्रह्म
निराकरोदनिराकरणमस्त्वनिराकरणम् मेऽस्तु।
तदात्मनि निरते य उपनिषत्सु धर्मास्ते
मयि सन्तु ते मयि सन्तु।
ॐ शान्तिः शान्तिः शान्तिः॥

Roman transliteration

oṃ āpyāyantu mamāṅgāni vākprāṇaścakṣuḥ
śrotram atho balam indriyāṇi ca sarvāṇi |
sarvam brahma upaniṣadam mā'haṃ brahma
nirākuryāṃ mā mā brahma
nirākarodanirākaraṇamastvanirākaraṇam me 'stu |
tadātmani nirate ya upaniṣatsu dharmāste
mayi santu te mayi santu |
oṃ śāntiḥ śāntiḥ śāntiḥ ||

English translation

Om! May my limbs, speech, vital air, eyes, ears, strength,
And all the senses be fully developed.
All that is revealed by the Upanishads is Brahman.
May I never deny Brahman:
May Brahman never disown me.
Let there be no repudiation (from Brahman);
Let there be no infidelity from my side.
May all the Dharmas extolled by the Upanishads shine in me
Who am intent on knowing the Self.
May they shine in me!
Om! Peace! Peace! Peace!

== Aitareya Upanishad ==
Devanagari

ॐ वाङ् मे मनसि प्रतिष्ठिता
मनो मे वाचि प्रतिष्ठित-मावीरावीर्म एधि।
वेदस्य म आणिस्थः श्रुतं मे मा प्रहासीरनेनाधीतेनाहोरात्रान्
संदधाम्यृतम् वदिष्यामि सत्यं वदिष्यामि तन्मामवतु
तद्वक्तारमवत्ववतु मामवतु वक्तारमवतु वक्तारम्।
ॐ शान्तिः शान्तिः शान्तिः॥

Roman transliteration

oṃ vāṅ me manasi pratiṣṭhitā
mano me vāci pratiṣṭhita māvīrāvīrma edhi |
vedasya ma āṇisthaḥ śrutaṃ me mā prahāsīranenādhītenāhorātrān
saṃdadhāmy ṛtam vadiṣyāmi satyaṃ vadiṣyāmi tan mām avatu tad-vaktāram avatu
avatu mām avatu vaktāram avatu vaktāram |
oṃ śāntiḥ śāntiḥ śāntiḥ ||

English translation

Om! May my speech be based on (i.e. accord with) the mind;
May my mind be based on speech.
O Self-effulgent One, reveal Thyself to me.
May you both (speech and mind) be the carriers of the Veda to me.
May not all that I have heard depart from me.
I shall join together (i.e. obliterate the difference of) day
And night through this study.
I shall utter what is verbally true;
I shall utter what is mentally true.
May that (Brahman) protect me;
May That protect the speaker (i.e. the teacher), may That protect me;
May that protect the speaker – may That protect the speaker.
Om! Peace! Peace! Peace!

== Mundaka, Māndukya and Prashna Upanishads ==
Devanagari

ॐ भद्रं कर्णेभिः श्रृणुयाम देवाः।
भद्रं पश्येमाक्षभिर्यजत्राः
स्थिरैरङ्गैस्तुष्टुवाग्ंसस्तनूभिः।
व्यशेम देवहितम् यदायुः।
स्वस्ति न इन्द्रो वृद्धश्रवाः।
स्वस्ति नः पूषा विश्ववेदाः।
स्वस्ति नस्तार्क्ष्यो अरिष्टनेमिः।
स्वस्ति नो बृहस्पतिर्दधातु॥
ॐ शान्तिः शान्तिः शान्तिः॥

Roman transliteration

oṃ bhadraṃ karṇebhiḥ śṛṇuyāma devāḥ |
bhadraṃ paśyemākṣabhir yajatrāḥ
sthirair aṅgais tuṣṭuvāgṁsas tanūbhiḥ |
vyaśema devahitam yadāyuḥ |
svasti na indro vṛddhaśravāḥ |
svasti naḥ pūṣā viśvavedāḥ |
svasti nas tārkṣyo ariṣṭanemiḥ |
svasti no bṛhaspatir dadhātu
oṃ śāntiḥ śāntiḥ śāntiḥ ||

English translation

Om! O gods, may we hear auspicious words with the ears;
While engaged in yagnas,
May we see auspicious things with the eyes;
While praising the gods with steady limbs,
May we enjoy a life that is beneficial to the gods.
May Indra of ancient fame be auspicious to us;
May the supremely rich (or all-knowing) Pusa (god of the earth)
Be propitious to us;
May Garuda, the destroyer of evil,
Be well disposed towards us;
May Brihaspati ensure our welfare.
Om! Peace! Peace! Peace!

== Vedas ==
There are various other Shanti Mantras from the Vedas, of which some of the notable ones are:

Devanagari
Roman transliteration
English translation

द्यौ: शान्ति॑र॒न्तरि॑क्षं॒ शान्ति॑: पृथि॒वी शान्ति॒रापः॒ शान्ति॒रोष॑धयः॒ शान्ति॒र्वन॒स्पत॑यः॒ शान्ति॒र्विश्वे॑ दे॒वाः शान्ति॒र्ब्रह्म॒ शान्तिः॒ ।
ताभिः॒ शान्ति॑भिः॒ सर्व॒ शान्ति॑भिः॒ शम॑यामो॒ऽहं यदि॒ह घो॒रं यदि॒ह क्रू॒रं यदि॒ह पा॒पं तच्छा॒न्तं तच्छि॒वं शम॑स्तु नः ॥
~ अथर्ववेदः १९.९.१४

dyau: śānti̍ra̱ntari̍kṣa̱ṃ śānti̍: pṛthi̱vī śānti̱rāpa̱ḥ śānti̱roṣa̍dhaya̱ḥ śānti̱rvana̱spata̍ya̱ḥ śānti̱rviśve̍ de̱vāḥ śānti̱rbrahma̱ śānti̱ḥ.
tābhi̱ḥ śānti̍bhi̱ḥ sarva̱ śānti̍bhi̱ḥ śama̍yāmo̱'haṃ yadi̱ha gho̱raṃ yadi̱ha krū̱raṃ yadi̱ha pā̱paṃ tacchā̱ntaṃ tacchi̱vaṃ śama̍stu naḥ.

Peace be upon the sky,
Peace be upon the atmosphere,
Peace be upon the earth,
Peace be upon the waters,
Peace be upon the herbs,
Peace be upon the trees,
Peace be upon the universal Gods,
Peace be upon the Supreme Spirit.
By these all-inclusive peaceful energies, I pacify whatever here is terrible, whatever here is cruel, whatever here is sinful; may that become peaceful and auspicious to us.
~ Atharvaveda 19.9.14

ॐ असतो मा सद्गमय ।
तमसो मा ज्योतिर्गमय ।
मृत्योर्माऽमृतं गमय ॥
ॐ शान्तिः शान्तिः शान्तिः ॥

oṃ asato mā sad gamaya
tamaso mā jyotir gamaya
mṛtyor mā 'mṛtaṃ gamaya
oṃ śāntiḥ śāntiḥ śāntiḥ

Not towards the unreal, lead us to the real
Not towards darkness, lead us to light
Not towards death, lead us to immortality
Om peace, peace, peace!

== Puranas ==
Devanagari

ॐ सर्वेषाऺ स्वस्तिर्भवतु ।
सर्वेषाऺ शान्तिर्भवतु ।
सर्वेषाऺ पूर्णं भवतु ।
सर्वेषाऺ मङ्गलं भवतु ।
ॐ शान्तिः शान्तिः शान्तिः ॥

Roman transliteration

oṃ sarveṣāṃ svastir bhavatu |
sarveṣāṃ śāntir bhavatu |
sarveṣāṃ pūrṇaṃ bhavatu |
sarveṣāṃ maṅgalaṃ-bhavatu |
oṃ śāntiḥ śāntiḥ śāntiḥ ||

English translation

1: May there be Well-Being in All,
2: May there be Peace in All,
3: May there be Fulfilment in All,
4: May there be Auspiciousness in All,
5: Om Peace, Peace, Peace.
— (Translation by Swami Abhedananda, Ramakrishna Vedanta Math, India)

== See also ==
- Ashtanga vinyasa yoga
- Hindu astrology
- Inner peace
- Lokaksema
- Om Namah Shivaya
- Sanctuary (Donna De Lory album)
- The Waste Land
- Vivaah
