= Two Friends =

Two Friends may refer to:

== Film ==
- Two Friends (1954 film), a Soviet film
- The Two Friends, a 1955 Italian film
- Two Friends (1986 film), an Australian film by Jane Campion
- Two Friends (2002 film), an Italian film
- Two Friends (2015 film), a French film

== Music ==
- Two Friends (DJs), an American DJ/producer duo
- Two Friends, a 2017 EP by Donna De Lory
- "Two Friends", a song by Amy Shark from her 2024 album Sunday Sadness

== Other uses ==
- Two Friends (ship), a Napoleonic War-era British troop transport
- "Two Friends" (short story), an 1882 story by Guy de Maupassant
- Two Friends, a 2017 EP by Donna De Lory
