= In the Glow =

Studio album by Donna De Lory
- Released: November 26, 2003
- Length: 52:39
- Label: Secret Road
- Producer: Donna De Lory

Donna De Lory chronology
Songs 95 (2002)	In the Glow (2003)	The Lover & the Beloved (2004)

In the Glow is the fourth studio album by American singer and songwriter Donna de Lory, independently released on November 26, 2003. It serves as her first album of completely original material since 2000's Bliss.

Professional ratings
Review scores
Source	Rating
AllMusic	(Favorable)

== Track listing ==
In the Glow – Standard edition
No.	Title	Writer(s)	Producer(s)	Length
1.	"One Day"	Donna De Lory	De Lory	8:43
2.	"Glow"	De Lory; Eric Bazilian	De Lory	9:33
3.	"Govinda Jaya Jaya" (featuring Niki Haris)	De Lory; Dave Stringer	De Lory	8:50
4.	"In the Sun"	Joseph Arthur; John W. Thompson	De Lory	6:34
5.	"Unbound"	De Lory	De Lory	5:20
6.	"Surrender"	De Lory	De Lory	8:31
7.	"Blessed Always"	De Lory	De Lory	5:08
Total length:				52:39
