= Lokaksema (Hindu prayer) =

Common reference in Hindu prayers

Lokaksema or Lokakshema is a Sanskrit word meaning "global well-being". Loka means "world", and Kshema means "welfare" in Sanskrit.

It is normally used in the context of various prayers and rituals performed in Hinduism. For example, there could be a big ritual yagna conducted for some common good such as a blessing for rains. It could also be used in the context of public prayers or mass chanting of mantras for a social cause.

Many Hindu rituals and ceremonies end with a generic prayers such as Lokāḥ Samastāḥ Sukhino Bhavantu, meaning "Let the entire world be happy." or Sarve Jana sukhino Bhavantu - Let the People of the world be happy.

The full version of this prayer is stated as follows:

स्वस्तिप्रजाभ्यः परिपालयंतां, न्यायेन मार्गेण महीं महीशाः ।

गोब्राह्मणेभ्यः शुभमस्तु नित्यं, लोकाः समस्ताः सुखिनोभवंतु ॥

ॐ शान्तिः शान्तिः शान्तिः |

svastiprajābhyaḥ paripālayantāṁ nyāyēna mārgēṇa mahīṁ mahīśāḥ ।

gōbrāhmaṇēbhyaḥ śubhamastu nityaṁ lōkāḥ samastāḥ sukhinōbhavantu ॥

ōm̐ śāntiḥ śāntiḥ śāntiḥ ॥

This Mangala (auspicious) Mantra is often recited after a pooja or religious ceremony. It can be broken down into separate sentences as follows:

प्रजाभ्यः स्वस्ति (अस्तु )। महीशाः महीं न्यायेन मार्गेण परिपालयन्तां । गोब्राह्मणेभ्यः नित्यं शुभं अस्तु । समस्ताः लोकाः सुखिनो भवन्तु ॥ ॐ शान्तिः शान्तिः शान्तिः ॥

May there be well being (auspiciousness) to the people;
May the kings rule the earth along the right path;
May the cows(& bulls) and the Brahmans (knower of vedas) always be fortunate.
May all the beings in all the worlds become happy;
Peace, peace and peace be to all, everywhere, in all circumstances!

The origin of the Lokaskema, often called the Mangala Mantra, is obscure. While some yoga practitioners and Hindu scholars erroneously point to the Rig Veda or the invocation of the Katha Upanishad, the only written attribution or textual source of "lokah samastah sukhino bhavantu" seems to be stone inscriptions from the Rulers of the Sangama Dynasty (1336 A.D.-1485 A.D.).

== See also ==
- Ashtanga vinyasa yoga
- Om Namah Shivaya
- Sanctuary (Donna De Lory album)
- Shanti Mantras
- Vivaah
- Om
- Inner peace
