= Calmness =

Mental state of inner peace

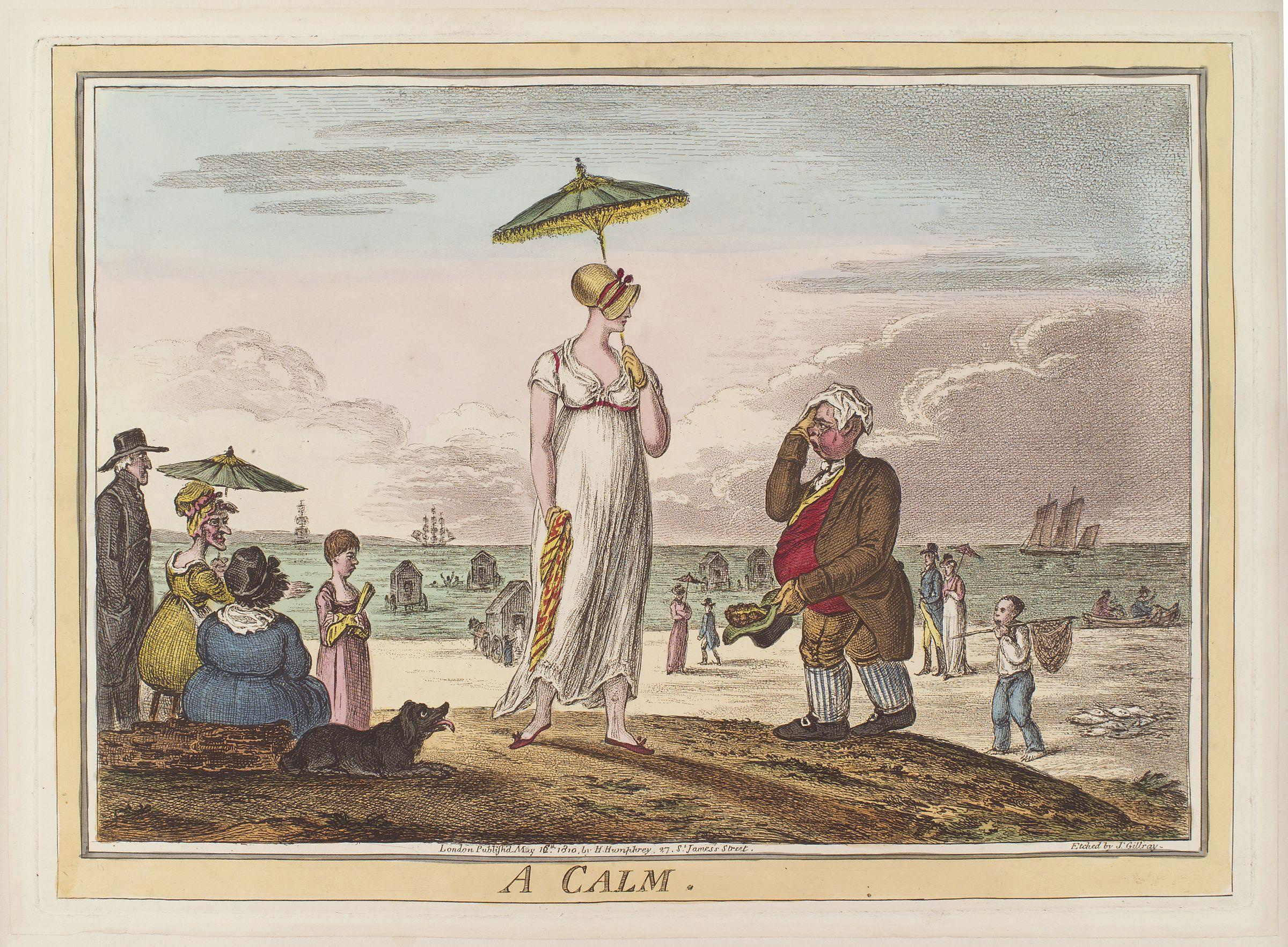
A Calm, by James Gillray

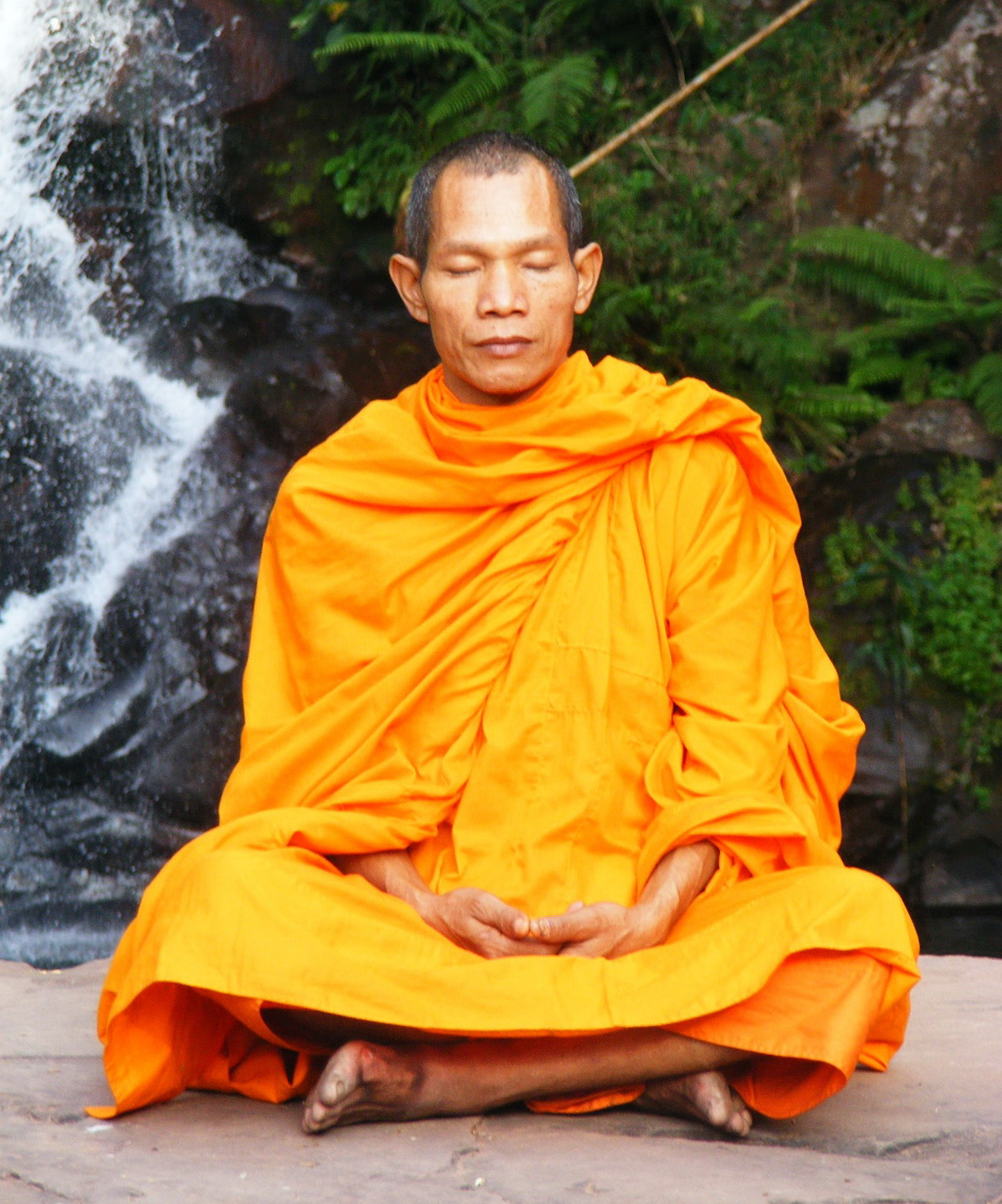
Meditation can help people be in a calm state.

Calmness or, nonchalance is the mental state of peace of mind, being free from agitation, excitement, or disturbance. It also refers to being in a state of serenity, tranquillity, or peace. Calmness can most easily occur for the average person during relaxation, but it can also be found during much more alert and aware states. Some people find that focusing the mind on something external, such as studying, or internal, such as breathing, can be very calming.

== Childhood origins ==
Parental soothing (by rocking, holding, etc.) in infancy lays the foundations of the capacity to self-calm. Thereafter transitional objects can help maintain calmness, while pets as self-objects also promote soothing and calmness.

== Cultivating calmness ==
Calmness is a quality that can be cultivated and increased with practice, or developed through psychotherapy. It usually requires training for one's mind to stay calm in the face of a great deal of different stimulation, and possible distractions, especially emotional ones. The negative emotions are the greatest challenge to someone who is attempting to cultivate a calm mind. Some disciplines that promote and develop calmness are prayer, yoga, tai chi, martial arts, theatre arts, gardening, relaxation training, breath training, and meditation. Jon Kabat-Zinn states that "Your mindfulness will only be as robust as the capacity of your mind to be calm and stable. Without calmness, the mirror of mindfulness will have an agitated and choppy surface and will not be able to reflect things with any accuracy."

Sarah Wilson recommends reducing one's exposure to choices/decisions as a route to calm.

== Peace of mind ==
Another term associated with calmness is "peace". A mind that is at peace or calm will cause the body to produce fewer stress hormones; this in turn gives the person a stable emotional state and promotes good health in every area of life, including marriage. It is beneficial to stay calm, especially during stressful events.

== Etymology ==
The term comes from Middle English calme, from Old French, from Old Italian calmo, from Late Latin cauma, "heat of the day", the "resting place in the heat of the day", from Greek kauma, burning heat, from kaiein, to burn.

== Cultural examples ==
- Gibbon praised Boethius: “the sage who could artfully combine in the same work, the various riches of philosophy, poetry, and eloquence, must already have possessed the intrepid calmness, which he affected to seek”.
- Rear Admiral Spruance, carrier commander at the Battle of Midway, was nicknamed "Electric Brain" because of his calmness in the hottest action.
- Lord David Cecil saw Wuthering Heights as dominated by the contrast between what he called on the one hand “the principle of storm... and on the other, the principle of calm – of the gentle, the merciful, the passive, and the tame”.

== See also ==
- Ataraxia – Concept in Hellenistic philosophy
- Equanimity – State of psychological stability and composure
- Humorism – Ancient Greek and Roman system of medicine involving four fluid types
- Stress – Organism's response to a stressor such as an environmental condition or a stimulus
- Vagus nerve – Main nerve of the parasympathetic nervous system
