= The Lover & the Beloved =

Studio album by Donna De Lory
- Released: January 31, 2004
- Length: 56:49
- Label: Ajna Music
- Producer: Donna De Lory; Dave Dale; Mac Quayle

Donna De Lory chronology
In the Glow (2003)	The Lover & the Beloved (2004)	Sky Is Open (2006)

The Lover & the Beloved is the fifth studio album by American singer and songwriter Donna de Lory, released on January 31, 2004 by Ajna Music. The project contains six mantras composed by De Lory and producer Dave Dale. De Lory's interpretation of "Govinda Jaya Jaya" originally appeared on her fourth studio album, In the Glow (2003).

Professional ratings
Review scores
Source	Rating
AllMusic	(Favorable)

== Track listing ==
The Lover & the Beloved – Standard edition
No.	Title	Writer(s)	Length
1.	"Ganapati Om"	Donna De Lory; Dave Dale; Cameron Stone; Dave Stringer	9:17
2.	"Om Nama Shivaya"	De Lory; Stone	7:47
3.	"He Ma Durga"	De Lory; David Newman; Jeremy Toback	7:14
4.	"Hare Krishna"	De Lory	8:06
5.	"Govinda Jaya Jaya"	De Lory; Stringer	8:50
6.	"Samba Sadashiva"	Traditional	7:39
Total length:			56:49

The Lover & the Beloved – Argentina edition bonus track
No.	Title	Writer(s)	Length
7.	"Govinda Jaya Jaya" (Mac Quayle Mix)	De Lory; Stringer	7:52
Total length:			64:41
