= Govinda =

Epithet of Krishna or Vishnu

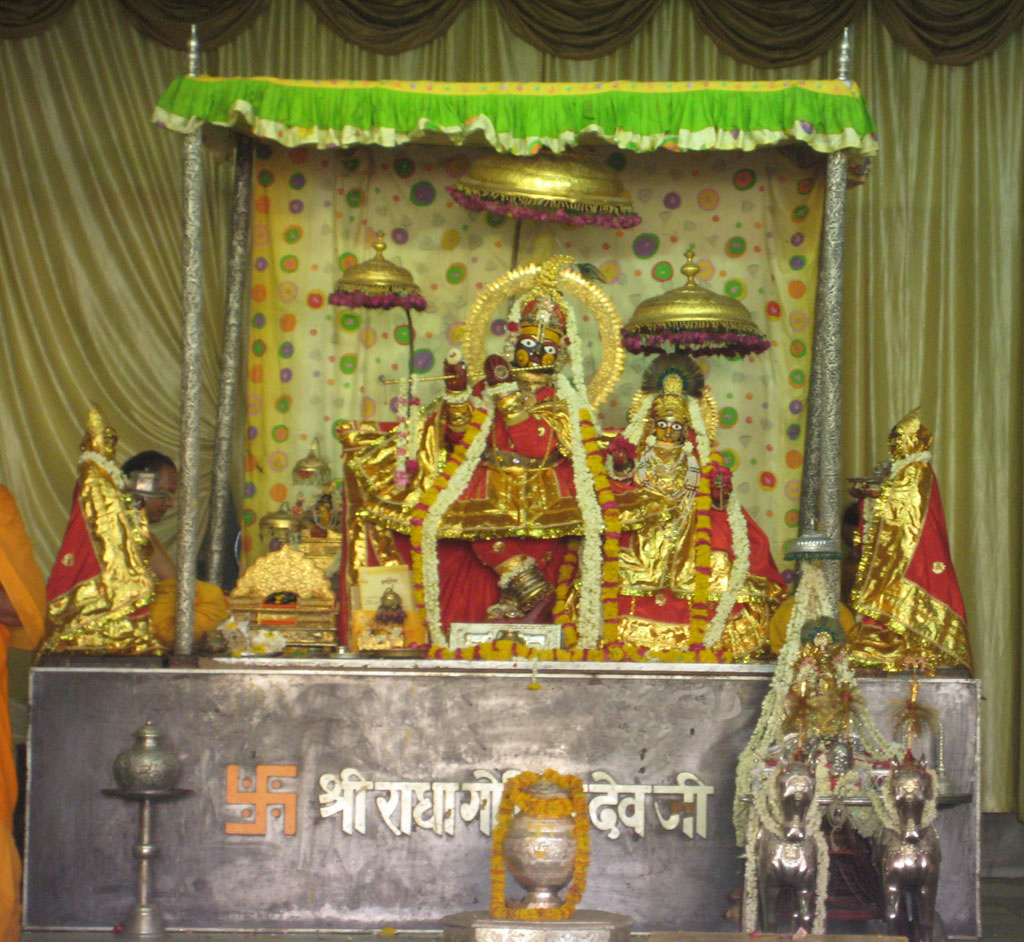
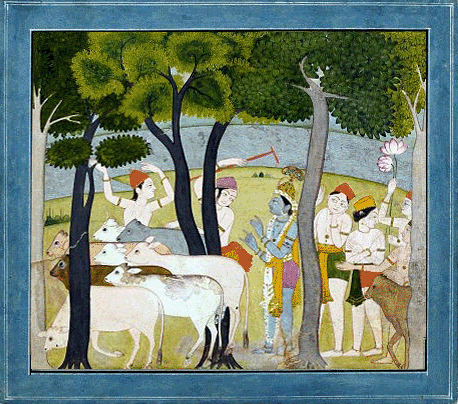
Krishna worshipped as Govinda with his consort Radha in the historic Govind Dev Ji Temple (left), Krishna and the cowherds, c. 1800, Victoria and Albert Museum (right)

Govinda (Sanskrit: गोविन्द, transl. "observer of cattle"), also rendered Govind, Gobinda, and Gobind, is an epithet of Vishnu and his avatars, such as Krishna. The name appears as the 187th and the 539th name of Vishnu in the Vishnu Sahasranama. The name is also popularly addressed to Krishna, referring to his youthful activity as a cowherd boy.

== Etymology ==
Govinda can be directly translated as "protector of cows". Moreover, in the word "Govinda", "Govu" means Indriyas. Govinda therefore means the all-pervading, omnipresent ruler of the sense organs, or Indriyas. "Govu" also means 'Vedas'. Hence Govinda is the supreme being who can be known through the Vedas.

== Interpretations ==
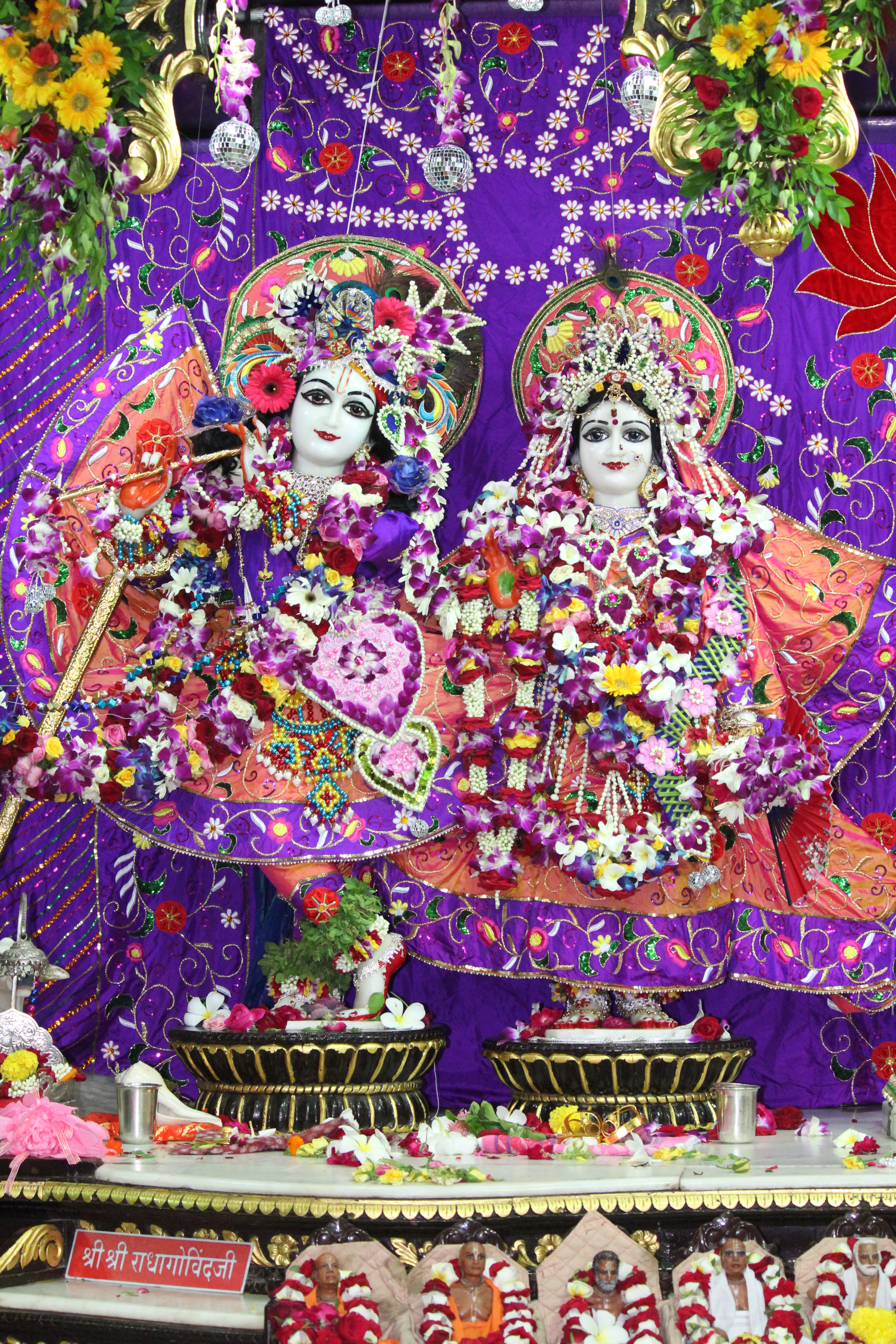
Krishna as Govinda at Sri Sri Radha Govind temple, Ahmedabad

Govinda is a name of Krishna and also appears as the 187th and 539th name of Vishnu in the Vishnu Sahasranama, the 1,000 names of Vishnu.

According to Adi Shankara's commentary on Vishnu Sahasranama, translated by Swami Tapasyananda, Govinda has four meanings:

1. The sages call Krishna "Govinda" as he pervades all the worlds, giving them power.
2. The Shanti Parva of the Mahabharata states that Vishnu restored the earth that had sunk into the netherworld, so all the devas praised him as Govinda (protector of the land).
3. Alternatively, it means "He who is known by Vedic words alone".
4. In the Harivamsa, Indra praised Krishna for having attained loving leadership of the cows which Krishna tended as a cowherd, by saying, "So men too shall praise him as Govinda."

In the Brahma Samhita, Krishna is praised as Govinda, who is eternal and origin of all living beings.

Maharishi Mahesh Yogi, in his commentary on the Bhagavad-Gita, states that Govinda means "master of the senses".

== Prayers ==
An 8th century Hindu devotional composition called "Moha Mudgara", composed by Adi Shankara, summarises: "If one just worships Govinda, one can easily cross this great ocean of birth and death." This refers to the belief that worshipful adoration of Vishnu or Krishna can lead believers out of the cycle of reincarnation (samsara) and lead them into an eternal blissful life in Vaikuntha, 'the supreme abode situated beyond this material world' where Govinda (Vishnu) resides. The composition expresses the value of inner devotion to Vishnu.

== See also ==
- Achyuta
- Gopala
- Gopinath
- Keshava
- Madhava
- Radha Ramana
- Vāsudeva
- Govinda (Kula Shaker song)
- Phalguna month (ruled by Govinda; this Govinda is different from the original Govinda, because he is not the son of Maharaja Nanda)
- Govinda Jaya Jaya an Indian devotional chant or song

== Notes ==
- Hein, Norvin (May 1986). "A Revolution in Kṛṣṇaism: The Cult of Gopāla". History of Religions. 25 (4): 296–317. doi:10.1086/463051. JSTOR 1062622. S2CID 162049250.
