= Just a Dream (Donna de Lory song) =

- CD maxi single cover artwork

Single by Donna de Lory

from the album Donna De Lory
- Released: March 9, 1993
- Length: 4:46
- Label: MCA
- Songwriters: Madonna; Patrick Leonard
- Producers: Madonna; Patrick Leonard

Donna de Lory singles chronology
| "Praying for Love" (1992) | "Just a Dream" (1993) | "Think It Over" (1993) |

"Just a Dream" is a song recorded by American singer Donna de Lory for her eponymous debut studio album (1992). It was released as the album's second single on March 9, 1993, by MCA Records. The song was written and produced by Madonna and Patrick Leonard while composing the former's fourth studio album, Like a Prayer (1989). Since Madonna felt "Just a Dream" would not suit her discography, she gave it to de Lory for recording. After release, the song received mixed review from critics. "Just a Dream" debuted and peaked at number 71 on the UK Singles Chart and reached number ten on the US Dance Club Songs and number 17 on the Dance Singles Sales charts, respectively.

== Background and release ==
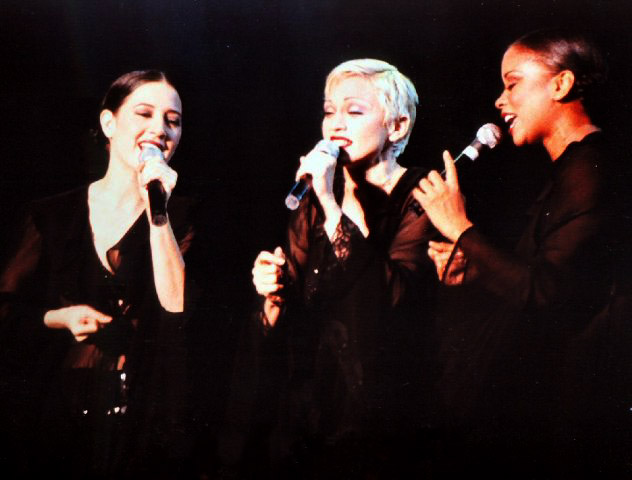
Donna de Lory performing with Madonna and Niki Haris during The Girlie Show World Tour in 1993

Donna de Lory worked as a background vocalist for American singer Madonna from the time when she was hired by the latter for her 1987 Who's That Girl World Tour. She continued working with Madonna for subsequent tours like Blond Ambition World Tour (1990), The Girlie Show World Tour (1993), Drowned World Tour (2001) and Confessions Tour (2006). When de Lory was preparing her eponymous debut studio album, Madonna offered her a song called "Just a Dream", which she had co-written with record producer Patrick Leonard for her fourth studio album, Like a Prayer (1989), but did not use it. As explained in Lucy O'Brien's biography, Madonna: Like an Icon, the singer felt that "Just a Dream" was too "rockier" for her discography and asked de Lory to contact Leonard and record it instead. Madonna's vocals were kept in the album version of the track with de Lory's vocals being added on top of it.

MCA Records released "Just a Dream" as the second single from de Lory's debut album on March 9, 1993, in 12-inch, cassette and CD formats. It also received a number of remixes which were added to the track list of the different releases. Along with Madonna and Leonard's songwriting and production, other personnel who worked on the track included Lenny Underwood who played the keyboards and Daniel Abraham who programmed the song. Abraham was assisted by Justin Strauss for additional production and remixing of "Just a Dream". Todd Culver edited the song while Doug Deangelis and Shaun James engineered the final mix.

== Reception ==
"Just a Dream" received mixed feedback from music critics. Reviewing the track for Billboard, editor Larry Flick felt it was de Lory's "valiant bid for top 40 radio acceptance" and described it as a "peppy li'l tune" which would be a suitable choice for mainstream and crossover radios. Flick also complimented the different remixes that the song received, with their genres ranging from power pop to Cathy Dennis-style disco. AllMusic's Bryan Buss reviewed de Lory's album and said that with songs like "Just a Dream" and "Praying for Love", the singer "showed she could perform pop with the best of them". Conversely, a writer for Out magazine criticized the inclusion of "Just a Dream" in de Lory's album, feeling that Madonna and Leonard's songwriting and production "ruined" the "peppy and optimism" nature of the record.

In the United States, "Just a Dream" reached number ten on the Dance Club Songs chart, and was present for a total of 11 weeks on it. The CD and the maxi singles released went on to chart on the Dance Singles Sales chart, reaching a peak of number 17. The song debuted and peaked at number 71 on the UK Singles Chart on the chart dated July 18, 1993, present for just one week.

== Track list ==
- US CD and cassette single
1. "Just a Dream" – 4:27
2. "Just a Dream" (Groovier version) – 4:38
- US 12-inch single
1. "Just a Dream" (Extended Club remix) – 7:35
2. "Just a Dream" (Hard Dub) – 6:40
3. "Just a Dream" (Just Right Vocal) – 6:56
- UK CD maxi single
1. "Just a Dream" (7-inch version) – 4:27
2. "Just a Dream" (Groovier version) – 4:38
3. "Just a Dream" (Justin Strauss remix) – 7:36
4. "Just a Dream" (C & C Posse House remix) – 8:33
5. "Just a Dream" (Dan's Extended Pop mix) – 6:29
- EU CD maxi single
1. "Just a Dream" – 4:10
2. "Just a Dream" (Alternate Pop mix) – 4:26
3. "Just a Dream" (Extended Club mix) – 7:36

== Personnel ==
Credits adapted from the liner notes of the CD single.

- Donna de Lory – vocals
- Madonna – songwriting, back vocals, production
- Patrick Leonard – songwriting, production
- Lenny Underwood – keyboards
- Daniel Abraham – programming, additional production, remixing
- Justin Strauss – additional production, remixing
- Todd Culver – editing
- Doug Deangelis – track engineering
- Shaun James – overdub engineering

== Charts ==
Chart performance for "Just a Dream"
| Chart (1993) | Peak position |
|---|---|
| UK Singles (Official Charts) | 71 |
| US Dance Club Songs (Billboard) | 10 |
| US Dance Singles Sales (Billboard) | 17 |
