= Sky Is Open =

Studio album by Donna De Lory
- Released: July 19, 2006
- Length: 53:49
- Label: Self-released
- Producer: Donna De Lory; Mac Quayle

Donna De Lory chronology
The Lover & the Beloved (2004)	Sky Is Open (2006)	Sanctuary (2009)

Sky Is Open is the sixth studio album by the American singer and songwriter Donna de Lory, independently released on July 19, 2006. Three songs on the album originally appeared on her fourth studio album In the Glow (2003): "One Day", "Glow" and "In the Sun".

== Track listing ==
Sky Is Open – standard edition
No.	Title	Writer(s)	Length
1.	"One Day"	Donna De Lory	4:33
2.	"River"	De Lory; Cameron Stone; Paul Gordon	4:34
3.	"Blue Eyed Angel"	De Lory	4:51
4.	"Sky Is Open"	De Lory; Stone; Mark Gorman	7:08
5.	"Fade in Time"	De Lory	5:59
6.	"Maybe"	De Lory; Stone	4:19
7.	"Walking Out of Yesterday"	De Lory; James Harrah	5:13
8.	"Glow"	De Lory; Eric Bazilian	6:39
9.	"Where Are You Now"	De Lory; Stone	4:23
10.	"In the Sun"	Joseph Arthur; John W. Thompson	6:10
Total length:			53:49

Sky Is Open – digipak bonus track
No.	Title	Length
11.	"Sky Is Open" (music video)	5:18
Total length:		59:07
