= David Newman (singer) =

American singer (1963 - 2024)

David Newman aka Durga Das
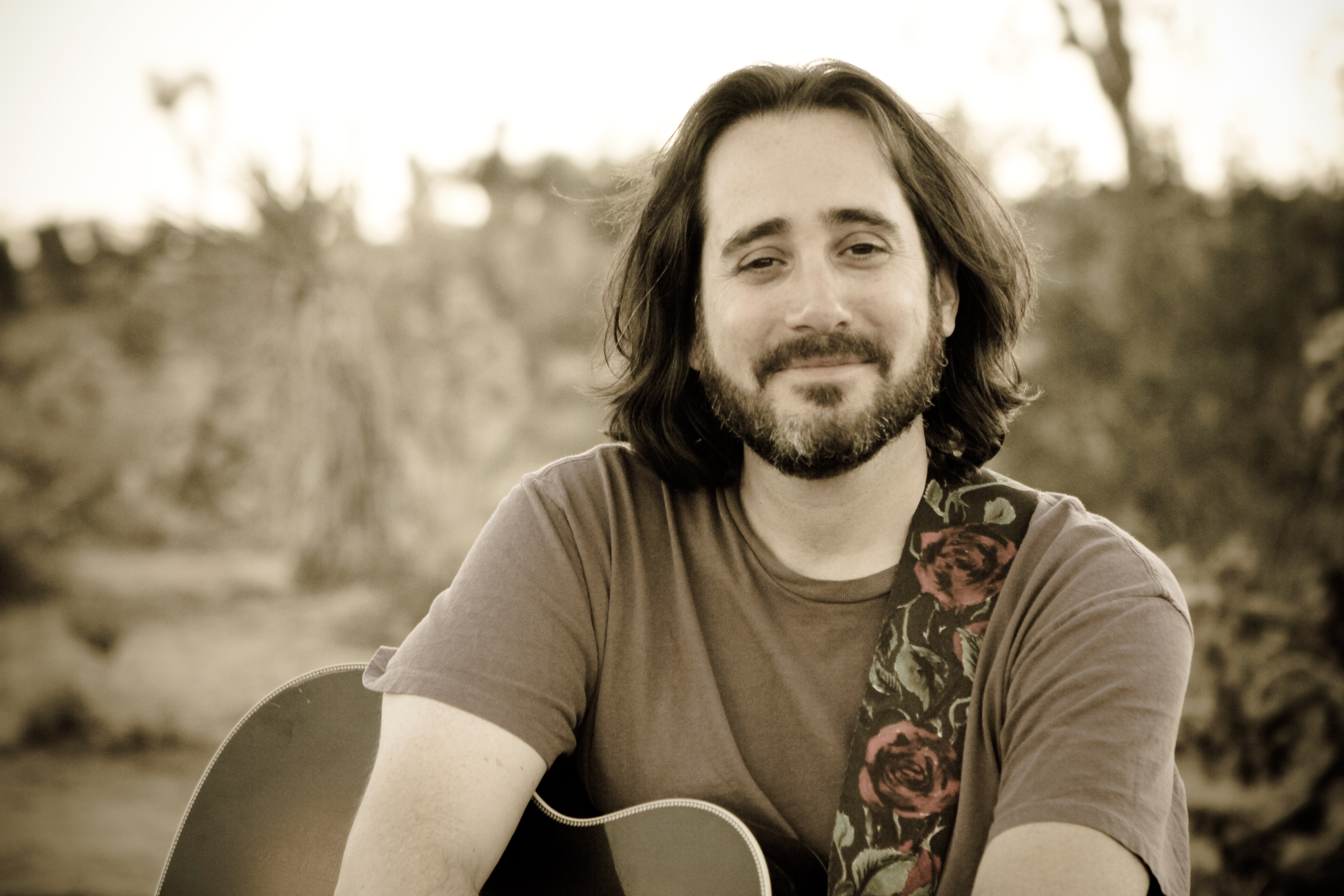

Background information
- Also known as: Durga Das
- Born: David Newman; December 31, 1963; Philadelphia, Pennsylvania, United States
- Origin: United States
- Died: April 18, 2024 (aged 60)
- Genres: World Music, Kirtan, Singer-Songwriter
- Occupations: Musician, Author, Teacher
- Years active: Since 1986
- Labels: Inner Fire Music, White Swan, Nutone/Nettwerk
- Website: www.davidnewmanmusic.com

David Newman was a sacred chant master, recording artist, singer/songwriter, best-selling author, and inspirational teacher. David, also known as Durga Das, traveled extensively sharing his music and teachings on the path of love as a vehicle for spiritual awakening.

== Biography ==
Newman's love of music began early when his Uncle bought him a guitar at age 13. He pursued a BA in music, graduating in 1986 from Bowdoin College in Maine. He performed as a singer-songwriter until 1988 and then worked as a music publisher in Los Angeles from 1988 to 1990.

Becoming disenchanted with the business side of music, Newman moved to New York City to study law. During his time at Cardozo Law School, Newman began to study yoga and found himself devoting several hours a day to it, a practice that he found improved his focus and ability to respond to the stresses of his classes.

In 1992, less than a month after passing the bar exam and obtaining a J.D., Newman opened a yoga studio, Yoga on Main, in Philadelphia. He studied in the Viniyoga tradition and also explored the teachings of other yoga lineages. He eventually integrated his studies and teaching experience to offer a style of yoga he named Inner Fire Yoga.

Over time Newman made the shift to practicing Bhakti Yoga and broadened Yoga on Main's focus from yoga center to a place of spiritual community, with a wide range of course offerings, including meditation instruction and kirtan events.

Newman found in kirtan a spiritual practice that re-energized his interest in making music, leading to the creation of his first album, Soul Freedom, produced by Kit Thomas and Ben Dowling and released by Inner Fire Music in 2003.

In 2004 Newman met New York City producer and mix engineer Frank Wolf. Together they recorded Lotus Feet: A Kirtan Revolution. Lotus Feet was reviewed on the National Public Radio show All Things Considered on June 20, 2006.

Leap of Grace, Newman's third album, is a recording of an ancient Indian healing prayer called the Hanuman Chalisa. Also produced by Newman and Frank Wolf, Leap of Grace was released in 2005 on the Pranamaya Music label.

Newman and Wolf followed up in 2006 with the CD/DVD set Into the Bliss, which includes a live recording of a kirtan event and an interview with Newman produced by Jennifer Young.

In the fall of 2007, Newman was approached by Nettwerk Records CEO and founder, Terry McBride, who had worked with Sarah Mclachlan, Avril Lavigne, and Barenaked Ladies. A yoga enthusiast, McBride signed Newman to a record deal with a desire to bring kirtan music to a widening audience. McBride also brought on board other chant artists including Krishna Das, Wah, Jai Uttal, Bhagavan Das, Donna De Lory, Wade Morissette, Reema Datta, and Sean Johnson. With the purpose of releasing inspiring chant music, McBride revived a subsidiary label of Nettwerk called Nutone Music.

Newman's fifth album, Love Peace Chant, was released on Nutone in September 2009, and his sixth, To Be Home, was released on Nutone in April 2010. To Be Home was produced by Newman and three-time Grammy Award-winning producer Trina Shoemaker.

In 2011 David founded the Stay Strong Project, which released a recording and video featuring prominent chant and yoga luminaries in partnership with Global Green USA in support of the Gulf Coast recovery and other environmental and humanitarian concerns.

On March 20, 2012, David released his seventh CD entitled Stars produced by David and Bill Moriarty on White Swan Records.

In November 2012 David launched the second Stay Strong Project release entitled You Can Count on Me/Shyam Bolo including a video and single featuring David, Donna De Lory, C.C. White, and others. All proceeds go to Global Green USA's Green School's Initiative.

In January 2013 White Swan Records released ReBliss, a remix of David's Stars CD in collaboration with composer, producer, Krishna Venkatesh.

On January 14, 2014, David released his ninth CD entitled Travel Well on Inner Fire Music/White Swan Records. It reached #16 on the iTunes Singer-Songwriter charts.

In April 2014 David's book, "The Timebound Traveler," was released on Non-Duality Press. It reached #1 on Amazon's New Age/Mysticism best seller list.

On April 21, 2015, David released his tenth album entitled Love is Awake on Inner Fire Music. The project was a collaboration between David and two members of Paul Simon's band: Bassist Bakithi Kumalo and percussionist Jamey Haddad. Love is Awake reached #1 on the iTunes World Music Charts.

On May 4, 2015, David released Song for Nepal to support the Seva Foundation’s Nepal Earthquake relief and rehabilitation fund.

On July 31, 2015, David released his eleventh album entitled Acoustic Chant: Ukulele Kirtan Serenades on Inner Fire Music. The project was a collaboration between David and songwriter/musician Eric Bazilian, and features traditional sanskrit chanting alongside elements of Hawaiian, Appalachian, and American folk music.

David partnered with Chapin Coffee to release his artist signature Love is Awake fair trade/organic coffee blend on October 8, 2015. Each bag sold feeds three malnourished Guatemalan children.

On October 23, 2015, David and White Swan Records released Acoustic Chant: Ukulele Kirtan Serenades Songbook and CD, an educational resource including chord charts, sheet music and mantra translations.

On November 1, 2016, David released a single and animated video entitled "Peace and Love." The project's theme presented a positive and healing message connected to the 2016 US presidential election.

In November 2016 David embarked on “The Mantra and Love Outreach Tour” in partnership with Call and Response Foundation, bringing mantras and healing music to addiction recovery facilities, psychiatric centers, nursing homes, institutions for autistic children, cerebral palsy, and homeless women and their children.

In 2017 David collaborated with ambient composer Michael Reiley McDermott on Lakshmi's Gifts, a groundbreaking recording combining Sanskrit mantras with binaural beats and sound healing technology. The EP was released under the band name "Binaural Mantras."

In September 2017 David, along with producer/director Nick Demos ("Memphis" and "Come from Away") and playwright Darrah Cloud, premiered the first reading of the musical "American Siddhartha" in New York City. David composed the music for this musical adaptation of the Hermann Hesse book "Siddhartha."

In April 2018 David released 'The Beloveds' album, a band project along with multi- instrumentalist Philippo Franchini.

On October 11, 2019, David released the single "Love Wins" donating 50 percent of profits for 2019 to KIND (Kids in Need of Defense).

On April 10, 2020, David released the single "Love Heals All Wounds" in collaboration with Katie Wise & Bhakti Explosion.

On September 18, 2020, David released the single "Love Wins (2020 Freedom Dance)" in collaboration with Srikala and Brenda McMorrow, with proceeds for 2020 offered to Equal Justice Initiative.

With his family by his side, he transitioned on the morning of April 18, 2024.

== Musical style ==
David Newman's music incorporates a wide range of musical and lyrical elements and explores a palette of influences from around the world. “David Newman is reminiscent of George Harrison, Dylan and Paul Simon when they are in Soul mode.” - LA Yoga Magazine. “At David Newman’s concert, the event’s volume knob seemed to go from low-level joy to full-on bliss, the kind you feel after climbing a gorgeous mountain or ending a tough run on a strong sprint. Strangers hugged and danced wildly.” - The Washington Post

== Discography ==
- Soul Freedom (2003) Inner Fire Music, Produced by Kit Thomas and Ben Dowling
- Leap of Grace: The Hanuman Chalisa (2005) Pranamaya Music, Produced by David Newman and Frank Wolf
- Lotus Feet: A Kirtan Revolution (2005) Inner Fire Music, Produced by Frank Wolf
- Into the Bliss: A Kirtan Experience (CD/DVD) (2006) Inner Fire Music / Divine Light Pictures, CD Produced by Frank Wolf and David Newman, DVD Produced and Directed by Jennifer Young
- Love Peace Chant (2008) Nutone Music / Nettwerk Records, Produced by Frank Wolf and David Newman
- To Be Home (2010) Nutone Music / Nettwerk Records, Produced by Trina Shoemaker and David Newman
- Stay Strong (single and video) (2011), The Stay Strong Project, Nutone Music / Nettwerk Records, David Newman and Various Artists
- Stars (2012) White Swan Records, Produced by David Newman and Bill Moriarty
- You Can Count on Me/Shyam Bolo (single and video) (2012), The Stay Strong Project, David Newman Music, David Newman and Various Artists
- ReBliss (2013) White Swan Records, David Newman and Krishna Venkatesh. Produced by David Newman, Krishna Venkatesh and Bill Moriarty
- Travel Well (2014) Inner Fire Music/White Swan Records. Produced by David Newman, Philippo Franchini, Frank Wolf, Mira, and Bill Moriarty
- Love is Awake (2015) Inner Fire Music. Produced by David Newman, Tom Spiker and Philippo Franchini
- Song for Nepal (single) (2015), Featuring Eric Bazilian and Mira, Inner Fire Music
- Acoustic Chant: Ukulele Kirtan Serenades (2015) Inner Fire Music. Produced by Eric Bazilian and David Newman
- Acoustic Chant: Ukulele Kirtan Serenades Songbook & CD (2015) White Swan Records
- Peace and Love (single and video) (2016) Inner Fire Music
- Lakshmi's Gifts (EP) (2017). Binaural Mantras. White Swan Records
- The Beloveds: David Newman and Philippo Franchini (2018) Inner Fire Music
- Love Wins (single) (2019) Inner Fire Music
- Love Heals All Wounds (single) (2020) White Swan Records
- Love Wins (2020 Freedom Dance) (single) (2020) Inner Fire Music

David Newman has also authored compositions appearing on the following releases:

- “He Ma Durga”, The Lover and the Beloved (2004) Anja Music, Recorded by Donna De Lory, Written by David Newman, Donna De Lory and Jeremy Toback
- "Bathe in these Waters", Sanctuary (2009) Nettwerk Records/Nutone Music, Recorded by Donna De Lory, Written by David Newman
- "Guru Om", Sanctuary (2009) Nettwerk Records/Nutone Music, Recorded by Donna De Lory, Written by David Newman and Donna De Lory
- "My Friend", A Living Prayer (2006) Inner Fire Music, Recorded by Mira, Written by David Newman
- "From Sita with Love", A Living Prayer (2006) Inner Fire Music, Recorded by Mira, Music by David Newman
- "Ma Amriteshwari", A Living Prayer (2006) Inner Fire Music, Recorded by Mira, Music by David Newman
- "By Your Side/Jaya Gurudev", Ben Leinbach Presents Sangha (2011) White Swan Records, Recorded by Ben Leinbach and David Newman
- "The Unchanging", The Unchanging (2013) De Lory Music, Recorded by Donna De Lory, Written by David Newman and Donna De Lory

== Bibliography ==
- Merging with Grace: A Journey from the Intimate to the Infinite, The Practice of Inner Fire Meditation (2006) Inner Fire Publications
- The Timebound Traveler: How My Journey as a Seeker Came to an End (April 30, 2014) Non-Duality Press

== Media ==
- NPR Audio Review of ‘Lotus Feet: A Kirtan Revolution,’ All Things Considered, ‘Lotus Feet’ Brings Indian Tradition to U.S. Pop by Marika Partridge, June 20, 2006
- The Yoga of Kirtan: Conversations on the Sacred Art of Chanting (book and accompanying CD) by Steven Rosen
- Lifestyle piece on WashingtonPost.com, Kirtan’s call-and-response chanting draws a growing number of Washingtonians by Michelle Boorstein, January 08, 2013
