= Inner peace =

Deliberate psychological or spiritual calm

Inner peace (also known as peace of mind) refers to a deliberate state of psychological or spiritual calm maintained despite the presence of stressors. It is associated with a state of psychological "homeostasis" and the opposite of being stressed or anxious, and is considered to be a state where one's mind performs at an optimal level, regardless of outcomes. Peace of mind is thus generally associated with a state of contentment and emotional well-being including bliss, happiness and contentment.

Peace of mind, serenity, and calmness are descriptions of a disposition free from the effects of stress. In various cultural traditions, inner peace is regarded as a state of consciousness attainable through practices such as breathing exercises, prayer, meditation, tai chi or yoga. Many spiritual practices refer to this peace as an experience of knowing oneself.

Achieving inner peace can be challenging due to the demands and stressors of daily life. Spiritual development is generally considered a gradual process, with various practices and approaches aimed at fostering a deeper sense of spirituality over time.

Research suggests that mindfulness training can contribute to inner peace by reducing stress and enhancing psychological well-being. A randomized controlled trial found that participants who underwent mindfulness training reported significantly higher levels of inner peace and lower stress-related symptoms compared to a control group. These findings indicate that structured mindfulness practices may serve as an effective method for fostering emotional stability and resilience.

Inner peace has been described as "a low-arousal positive emotional state coupled with a sense of balance or stability."Inner peace is also assumed to be a highly beneficial state and one that reflects human flourishing.

Tenzin Gyatso, the current and 14th Dalai Lama, emphasizes the importance of inner peace in the world:

The question of real, lasting world peace concerns human beings, so basic human feelings are also at its roots. Through inner peace, genuine world peace can be achieved. In this the importance of individual responsibility is quite clear; an atmosphere of peace must first be created within ourselves, then gradually expanded to include our families, our communities, and ultimately the whole planet.

== See also ==
- Ataraxia
- Dignity
- Equanimity
- Gelassenheit
- Hesychia
- Inner conflict
- Inner light
- Meaning of life
- Mindfulness
- Nirvana
- Self-actualization
- Self-ownership
- Self-realization
- Shanti Mantras
- Tranquillity
- Yin and yang
