= Govinda Jaya Jaya =

"Govinda Jaya Jaya" is an Indian devotional chant or song. It is often sung in the Krishna Consciousness movement founded by A.C. Bhaktivedanta Swami Prabhupada, and by various other schools of yoga, and by Hindus in general. Prabhupada's devotees Radha Krishna Temple (London) recorded the chant as "Govinda Jai Jai" for their eponymous album, produced by George Harrison and released on the Beatles' Apple record label in 1971. The recording was first issued as the B-side of the devotees' 1970 single "Govinda".

In 1996, the English rock band Kula Shaker adapted "Govinda Jaya Jaya" into their hit song "Govinda". Their song remains the only British top-ten hit sung entirely in Sanskrit. Speaking in 2016, Alonza Bevan, the bass player of Kula Shaker, said that it was "nice to get an ancient Indian hymn [played] on Radio 1 in the UK".

== Composition ==
The song's lyrics run:

Govinda Jaya Jaya
Gopala Jaya Jaya
Radha Ramana Hari
Govinda Jaya Jaya

Literal meaning:

Govinda (Krishna, The Divine Cow Finder), Glory, Glory
Gopala (Krishna, Protector Of Cows), Glory, Glory
Radha Ramana (Krishna, Lover Of Radha), Hari (Krishna/Vishnu)
Govinda, Glory, Glory

Recordings of the song have also been made by Prabhupada himself, and by Vishnujana Swami, Jai Uttal, Maki Asakawa, Alice Coltrane, and Donna De Lory.
