= Songs 95 =

Studio album by Donna De Lory
- Released: 2002
- Length: 51:13
- Label: Secret Road

Donna De Lory chronology
Bliss (2000)	Songs 95 (2002)	In the Glow (2003)

Songs 95 is the third studio album by American singer and songwriter Donna de Lory, released in 2002 by Secret Road Music Services. It contains ten songs by De Lory written throughout 1995. Several of the album's songs would later be reworked and appear on her succeeding albums. "Where I've Never Been" originally appeared on her second studio album Bliss (2000) and was distributed as a promotional CD single in the United States in 2001.

== Track listing ==
Songs 95 – Standard edition
No.	Title	Length
1.	"Every Child in the Sun"	6:03
2.	"Through His Eyes"	4:56
3.	"Without You"	6:18
4.	"Chosen Ones"	5:56
5.	"Where I've Never Been"	4:14
6.	"Under the Moonlight"	5:20
7.	"Faith"	4:01
8.	"I'll Be There for You"	5:14
9.	"So Alone"	4:23
10.	"Sylvia"	4:48
Total length:		51:13
