= Donna DeLory (album) =

Studio album by Donna de Lory
- Released: 1992
- Recorded: 1992
- Genre: Dance
- Length: 44:36
- Label: MCA
- Producer: Denny Fongheiser; Stephen Hague; Patrick Leonard; Madonna; Matt Sherrod

Donna de Lory chronology
Donna DeLory (1992)	Bliss (2000)

Singles from Donna DeLory
- 1. "Praying for Love" Released: October 20, 1992; 2. "Just a Dream" Released: March 9, 1993; 3. "Think It Over" Released: July 27, 1993

Donna DeLory is the debut album by American singer and songwriter Donna de Lory, released in 1992 by MCA Records. Three singles were released from the album: "Praying for Love," "Just a Dream," and "Think It Over." The second single charted in the United Kingdom and became a top ten hit in the United States on the Dance Club Songs chart.

Professional ratings
Review scores
Source	Rating
AllMusic	4/5 stars

== Track listing ==
Donna DeLory – Standard edition
No.	Title	Writer(s)	Producer(s)	Length
1.	"Think It Over"	Donna de Lory; Aika Jude; Matthew Garey	Stephen Hague; Denny Fongheiser (add.)	4:13
2.	"Shiny Red World"	de Lory; Bruce Gaitsch	Hague	4:15
3.	"Praying for Love"	de Lory; Paul Gordon	Hague	4:26
4.	"Somewhere in My Heart"	de Lory; Billy Steinberg; Tom Kelly	Matt Sherrod	4:23
5.	"Frankie (You Don't Need That Gun)"	Brian Elliot	Sherrod	5:06
6.	"It's My House"	de Lory; Peter Vale; Mick Lesson	Sherrod	3:50
7.	"Just a Dream"	Madonna; Patrick Leonard	Madonna; Leonard	4:46
8.	"World with No Shame"	de Lory; Gaitsch	Hague	5:00
9.	"Down for the Count"	Melissa Ritter; Sherod	Sherrod	4:30
10.	"You Got Love"	de Lory; Ritter; Sherod	Sherrod	4:07
Total length:				44:36

== Personnel ==
- Donna DeLory: Main Vocals, Vocal Backing
- Stevie Lange, Madonna, "Angel Voices" Boys Choir, Danny Peck, Nikki Harris: Vocal Backing
- Danny Bordeaux, Morris Michael, Bruce Gaitsch, Dann Huff, Tim Pierce: Guitars
- Andy Duncan: Percussion
- Brad Cole, Rick Jude, Stephen Hague, Patrick Leonard: Keyboards
- Paul Trudeau: Piano
- Matt Sherrod: Keyboards, Drums, Percussion
- Guy Pratt, Deon Estus, Brad Willard: Bass
- Denny Fongheiser, John Robinson: Drums

== Sales ==
Region	Certification	Certified units/sales
Japan	—	20,000
