= Bliss (Donna De Lory album) =

Studio album by Donna De Lory
- Released: September 19, 2000
- Length: 50:23
- Label: Secret Road
- Producer: Donna De Lory; Cameron Stone; Jon Ingoldsby; Mac Quayle

Donna De Lory chronology
Donna DeLory (1992)	Bliss (2000)	Songs 95 (2002)

Singles from Bliss
- 1. "On and On" Released: 2000

Bliss is the second studio album by American singer and songwriter Donna de Lory, released in 2000 by Secret Road Music Services. "On and On" was released as the album's only single; a remixes EP for the song was distributed in 2000, prompting it to reach #17 on the Dance Club Songs chart in the United States. "Where I've Never Been" was released as a promotional CD in 2001.

Professional ratings
Review scores
Source	Rating
AllMusic	2.5/5 stars

== Track listing ==
Bliss – Standard edition
No.	Title	Writer(s)	Producer(s)	Length
1.	"On and On"	Donna De Lory; Niki Haris; Cameron Stone	De Lory; Stone; Jon Ingoldsby	5:02
2.	"Hold Me Now"	De Lory	De Lory; Stone; Ingoldsby	4:29
3.	"Where I've Never Been"	De Lory; Stone	De Lory; Ingoldsby	4:09
4.	"Only Time"	De Lory; Stone	De Lory; Stone	4:43
5.	"Go Talk to Mary"	De Lory	De Lory; Stone; Ingoldsby	5:18
6.	"Love Never Dies"	De Lory; Stone; Ludwig van Beethoven	De Lory; Stone	4:36
7.	"Please"	De Lory; Stone	De Lory; Stone; Ingoldsby	4:31
8.	"Te Amo"	De Lory; Stone	De Lory; Stone	3:44
9.	"Free"	De Lory; Stone	De Lory; Stone; Ingoldsby	3:41
10.	"A Woman's Pride"	De Lory; Mac Quayle	De Lory; Quayle	4:37
11.	"Amazing Grace"	John Newton	De Lory; Stone	5:33
Total length:				50:23
