= Sanctuary (Donna De Lory album) =

Studio album by Donna De Lory
- Released: March 24, 2009
- Length: 53:41
- Label: Nutone Music
- Producers: Donna De Lory; Mac Quayle

Donna De Lory chronology
Sky Is Open (2006)	Sanctuary (2009)	The Unchanging (2013)

Sanctuary is the seventh studio album by American singer and songwriter Donna de Lory, released by Nutone Music on March 24, 2009.

== Track listing ==
Sanctuary – Standard edition
No.	Title	Writer(s)	Length
1.	"Aham Prema"	Donna De Lory	7:11
2.	"Sanctuary"	Randy Scruggs; John W. Thompson	6:30
3.	"Guru Om"	De Lory; David Newman	7:11
4.	"Jai Ma"	De Lory; Cameron Stone	6:27
5.	"Bathe in These Waters"	Newman	6:41
6.	"Lokah Samastah Sukino Bhavantu"	De Lory; Stone	10:10
7.	"Om Namah Shavaya/Thy Will Be Done"	De Lory	9:31
Total length:			53:41

== See also ==
- Om Namah Shivaya
- Lokah Samastah Sukhino Bhavantu
- Om
