= Donna De Lory =

American singer, dancer and songwriter

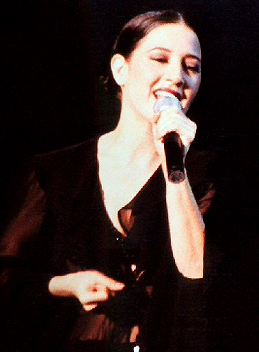
- Donna De Lory performing in 1993

Background information
- Born: September 10, 1964 (age 62); Calabasas, California
- Genres: World music, Pop
- Occupation: Musician
- Instruments: Vocals, Harmonium, keyboard
- Years active: 1970s–present
- Labels: CD Baby, MCA, Secret Road Records
- Website: donnadelory.com

Donna De Lory born on September 10, 1964, is an American singer, dancer and songwriter. Part of a musical family, De Lory has been performing since a young age. Her voice can be heard on albums by Carly Simon, Ray Parker Jr., Kim Carnes, Santana, Martika, Laura Branigan, Belinda Carlisle, Selena, Bette Midler, Barry Manilow, Mylène Farmer, Alisha and Madonna. De Lory accompanied Madonna as backing vocalist and dancer on every concert from the Who's That Girl Tour in 1987, up to the Confessions Tour in 2006. Her performance with Madonna at the Live Earth 2007 concert in London was their final professional collaboration to date.

== Early life ==
Donna De Lory was born September 10 ,1964 in Calabasas, California to record producer/musician Al De Lory and Mary Helyn Soncini.

De Lory has been surrounded by music ever since she was born. The De Lory family is very musical and is well known in the music industry. Her father played piano, electronic organ, and harpsichord on The Beach Boys' Pet Sounds album. He was a producer at Capitol Records and was responsible, among other things, for producing Glen Campbell's '"golden era". In addition, he co-wrote the 1960 Billboard Hot 100 #1 novelty hit for Larry Verne, Mr. Custer. Her grandfather played upright bass and cello for the Warner Bros. Studios Orchestra, recording the scores of classic movies such as Casablanca and Gone with the Wind. Her mother was a singer and dancer. Donna's older brother Alan, known as A.D. DeLory, is also a singer and songwriter. De Lory's late older sister Jolene sang background vocals on the 1973 Carpenters single "Sing".

De Lory made her professional singing debut at age eight singing a Recipe dog food commercial. She sang on children's albums for Walt Disney and was heard on the tune "It's a Small World", featured on a ride at Disneyland and Disney World. She also sang on commercials for McDonald's, Mattel, and Eastman Kodak. In addition, she contributed vocals to projects by Kim Carnes, Barry Manilow, Santana and the Rocky II soundtrack.

She moved to Nashville with her father and brother at the age of 16 following the death of her mother from breast cancer in 1980. Her father found a professional home in Nashville's Music Row area as a producer for Capitol Records. She started working at a vegetarian restaurant and from there, became a vegetarian. De Lory made friends with a few songwriters and became inspired by seeing how much effort they put into their work. She started spending a lot of her time on writing songs and recording demos before going back to California after finishing Hillsboro High School to study dancing, singing and acting.

== Career ==
=== Madonna ===
De Lory first came to the public's attention as Madonna's backup singer. In 1985, Gardner Cole, then De Lory's boyfriend, wrote the song "Open Your Heart" which Madonna would later record. At the time Madonna's management was looking for material for her True Blue album, and Cole submitted three songs, including "Open Your Heart". Madonna's manager heard the song and thought it would be a hit for Madonna, so he asked Cole to re-record the song with a female voice. De Lory recorded the song, and Cole then submitted the recording to Madonna's producer Patrick Leonard. Madonna listened to the recording and decided to record the song. Leonard liked De Lory's voice and hired her to sing backup on future projects he produced. When Madonna was looking for backup singers for her 1987 Who's That Girl Tour, De Lory asked Leonard to take her to the auditions. De Lory got the job and toured with Madonna on all her world tours until 2007. De Lory also sang backup on many of Madonna's songs.

=== Solo career ===
In 1990, she recorded the song "Always Thinking of You" for the film Three Men and a Little Lady. Her self-titled debut album was released on MCA Records in late 1992. The first single off the album, "Praying For Love", was released 20 October 1992 and went to #1 on the charts in Japan. The second single, "Just A Dream", was released 9 March 1993 and was a top 10 hit on the Hot Dance Club Play chart. It peaked at #71 in the UK Singles Chart in July 1993. "Just A Dream" was written and produced by Madonna and Patrick Leonard and was originally recorded by Madonna for her 1989 Like a Prayer album. De Lory's version incorporated backing vocals by Madonna. The third and final single off the album, "Think It Over", was released 27 July 1993.

She recorded a second album titled Songs '95 and had plans to release it in 1995, but it remained unreleased until 2002. She left the MCA label in late 1994 because her growing interest in world music was starting to show in her own music, much to the dismay of her label who wanted her to keep making pop music. At around this time she was introduced to the Harmonium, an instrument she has been using ever since. She was given the instrument at a party and she learned to play it by herself. She toured France as a backup singer and dancer for Mylène Farmer in 1996 and appears on the live CD/DVD Live à Bercy.

She formed the band Bliss together with cellist Cameron Stone in 1997, whom she was introduced to at the recommendation of her drummer, and released the album Love Never Dies. However, they decided to rename the album to Bliss and bill it to De Lory's name because there already were too many other bands with Bliss in their name and De Lory already had name recognition from her first album and her work with Madonna. The second version of the album billed to Donna's name included new album artwork and the song "Where I've Never Been" which was not on the first version. The name Bliss came from the saying "follow your bliss" which is from one of Donna's favorite authors, Joseph Campbell. De Lory and Stone built a fully equipped 24-track digital studio in her garage, then packed it up and took it in a U-Haul to a cabin in Taos, New Mexico, where most of the material for the album was created. They spent most of 1997 working on the album and finished it by the end of the year. The album was released in early 1998. Cameron Stone also worked on all of her subsequent albums, such as the 2003 album In The Glow. De Lory's 2004 album, The Lover & The Beloved, was a Sanskrit and English CD released on the Ajna Music label.

De Lory performed Princess Elise's theme, "My Destiny", in the 2006 game Sonic the Hedgehog. Her reinterpretation of Joseph Arthur's, In the Sun was featured at the end of episode 5 of NBC's drama Life. Her version of Madonna's song "Papa Don't Preach" appeared in the 2010 film, The Switch.

In 2010, De Lory contributed the song "Bathe in These Waters" to the Yoga Revolution compilation album, a benefit release supporting yoga and fitness programs for underserved schools.

In 2013, De Lory announced via her Twitter account that she would be releasing a new album titled The Unchanging. It was released worldwide on iTunes on 27 August 2013 and made #2 on the World Music Album chart. De Lory combines her melodic vocals and world music influences, but predominantly sings in English. Her former singing partner Niki Haris also features on the track "Kinder" along with Tina Malia. The album also includes a reinterpretation of her single "Praying for Love" and her take on "Amazing Grace". In 2016, De Lory teamed up with Haris to record a cover version of Madonna's 1993 single "Rain", to which they originally had sung backing vocals.

== Discography ==
- Donna DeLory (1992)
- Bliss (2000)
- Songs 95 (2002)
- In the Glow (2003)
- The Lover & the Beloved (2004)
- Sky Is Open (2006)
- Sanctuary (2009)
- The Unchanging (2013)
- Elixir: Songs of the Radiance Sutras (2015)
- Here in Heaven (2018)
- Gone Beyond (2021)

== Filmography ==
- Madonna: Truth or Dare (1991)
- Women of the Night (2001)
- I'm Going to Tell You a Secret (2005)
